= 10th Bomber Division =

Military unit

- 空军航空兵第十师
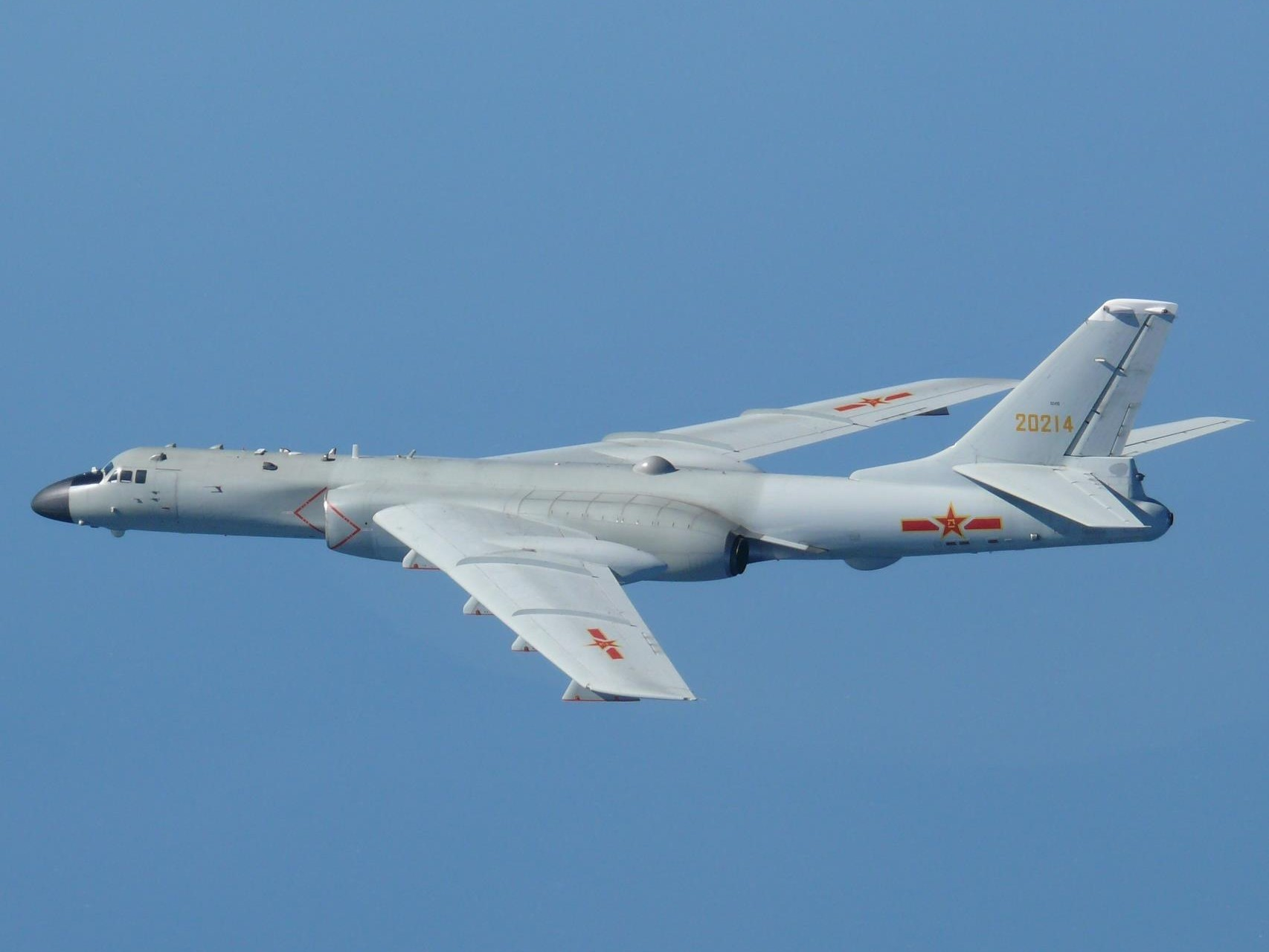
- An intercepted H-6K of the 28th Reg, 10th Div
- Active: 17 January 1951–Present
- Country: China
- Allegiance: Chinese Communist Party
- Branch: People's Liberation Army Air Force
- Role: Bomber
- Part of: Eastern Theater Command Air Force: 10th Bomber Division
- Garrison/HQ: Anqing Air Base, Luhe Air Base
- Nicknames: 10th Bomber Division, Model Bomber Group, Unit 94810

Insignia
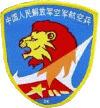
- Sleeve insignia of the 10th Bomber Division

Aircraft flown
- Bomber: Xian H-6K, H-6M

The 10th Bomber Division or 10th Air Division (10th AD, Chinese: 空军航空兵第十师; pinyin: Kōngjūn Hángkōngbīng dì Shí Shī, Unit 94810) of the People's Liberation Army Air Force (PLAAF) is an air formation of the People's Republic of China (PRC). The 10th Bomber Division has been accorded the honorary titles of "Model Bomber Group" (模范轰炸机大队) and "Red Banner Division" (红旗师) and is the PLAAF's unit of choice to send to international skills competitions.

As one of only three bomber divisions of the PLAAF and the only bomber division assigned to the Eastern Theater Command Air Force, the 10th Bomber Division is almost certainly responsible for providing strategic bombing support capabilities to a potential conflict in the East China Sea including Korea, Japan, or, principally, one involving Taiwan.

== History ==
The 10th Bomber Division was established on 17 January 1951 in Nanjing, Jiangsu Province as only the second bomber unit in the People's Republic of China following the creation of the 8th Bomber Division less than two months before. Like the 8th Bomber Division, the 10th drew its initial manning from the PLAAF's first air unit, the 4th Composite Air Brigade, which was also stationed in Nanjing. Originally consisting of the 28th, 29th, and 30th Bomber Regiments operating Soviet-gifted Tupolev Tu-2 bombers, the newly formed 8th Bomber Division was moved to Liaoyang in Liaoning Province to support the People's Volunteer Army against United Nations forces in the Korean War. During the struggle for the island of Taehwa-do, the 8th Bomber Division bombed during daylight hours and the 10th at night. The division was later stationed in Qiqihar, Heilongjiang Province and, in September 1956, moved again to Tangshan, Hebei Province where it would join the Beijing Military Region Air Force (MRAF). Expanding its role to include electronic reconnaissance and electronic warfare, the 28th Bomber Regiment of the 10th Bomber Division received its first series of Illyushin Il-28 bombers in 1957.

In the autumn of 1968, the PLAAF swapped the garrisons of the 8th and 10th Bomber Divisions implementing Lin Biao's dictate that troops should not live in one place for too long while wary of the involvement of the Nanjing Military Region Air Force's participation in the factional struggles of Mao's Cultural Revolution. Later, the 28th and 29th Bomber Regiments of the division began receiving H-6 bombers (a variant of the Soviet Tupolev Tu-16). Shortly after, on 18 December 1968, the 10th Bomber Division's Deputy Commander Li Zhiguo reportedly experienced a cabin short circuit, setting the aircraft ablaze. Although the radioman Ma Shaocheng and navigator Li Qianyuan safely ejected and parachuted to the ground, Li died on board the crashed bomber. Relocated again to Huaining County in Anhui Province, the 10th Bomber Division engaged in tests bombing ice floes on the Yellow (Huang He) River and a number of nuclear tests using the Chinese built Harbin H-5 (variant of the Il-28s) during the early 1970s.

The 30th Bomber Regiment, which had operated the electronic reconnaissance and electronic warfare Il-28s did not receive the new H-6 bombers, instead it was drawn to establish the 142nd Bomber Regiment of the 48th Bomber Division, a now-defunct bomber unit established in August 1970 in Fuyang, Hunan Province. A part of the Guangzhou Military Region Air Force, the 142nd Bomber Regiment was abolished in 1985 and the 48th Bomber Division in 1992. Aircraft and personnel of the former 142nd Bomber Regiment (originally the 30th Bomber Regiment of the 10th Bomber Division) became an independent electronic warfare regiment where it remained until 2003 when the regiment was equipped with specialized variants of Y-8 transport aircraft and reinstated as the 30th Bomber Regiment under the 10th Bomber Division. Adding to the regiment's tumultuous lineage, the 30th Bomber Regiment was abolished in 2012 until, in 2017, it had been re-established and given H-6M bombers.

In the 2016 restructure of the People's Liberation Army, the Nanjing Military Region (under which 10th Bomber Division was hitherto assigned) became the Eastern Theater Command Air Force.

== Activities ==
On 1 October 2019, the first hypersonic unmanned aerial vehicle (UAV), the WZ-8 (Chinese: 无侦-8; pinyin: Wú zhēn-bā; lit. 'unmanned recon-8') was unveiled to the public towed at a military parade in Beijing. Although the serial numbers on the WZ-8 airframes were covered for the parade (and covered again at the 2021 Zhuhai Air Show), the state-run, PLA-focused news outlet CCTV-7 published footage of the towed-UAVs during 2019 parade rehearsals with serial numbers unredacted. The two serial numbers, 21311 and 21312, are within the serial range for the 10th Bomber Division's 30th Bomber Regiment stationed at Luhe Air Base just north of Nanjing City, Jiangsu Province. Images showing suspension lugs atop the aircraft's dorsal spine further suggest the WZ-8 UAV is to be air-launched from underneath an H-6 bomber raising confidence in the UAV's potential assignment to the bomber unit.

In 2021, the 10th Bomber Division began to receive H-6Js, the upgraded naval variant of the H-6K with improved payload capacities and electronic warfare capabilities. It is unclear which regiments may have received the new H-6Js.

On 19 September 2020, in response to U.S. Undersecretary of State Keith Krach's visit to Taipei, the official People's Liberation Army Air Force Sina Weibo account posted a video titled "The God of War H-6K Goes on the Attack!" which showed a movie-trailer-style simulated strike on Anderson Air Force Base in Guam and used clips copied from a number of American movies including The Hurt Locker, The Rock, and Transformers: Revenge of the Fallen. The two H-6s prominently featured in the video bear the tail numbers 20012 and 20013 and are from the 28th Bomber Regiment of the 10th Bomber Division. Online mockery of the video, highlighting the crudely copied footage, led to the PLAAF deleting the post three days later.

For years, H-6K bombers of the 10th Bomber Division's 28th Bomber Regiment have routinely joined other military aircraft of the PLAAF (including J-11s, J-16s, Y-8s, Su-30s, KJ-500s, and various UAVs) in unannounced incursions into the Taiwanese and sometimes Japanese Air Defense Identification Zones (ADIZ) carrying a variety of payload munitions. These incursions have gained international attention, especially in annual joint patrols between bombers of the Chinese 28th Bomber Regiment and Russian Tu-95MS strategic bombers including during meetings of the Quad.

On 30 November 2022, two H-6 bombers of the 10th Bomber Division's 28th Bomber Regiment (tail numbers 20213 and 20214) joined four Russian Tu-95 strategic bombers in an eight-hour joint patrol through the Tsushima Strait and into the Sea of Japan. The joint bomber patrol, met by scrambled fighters from Korea and Japan, was escorted by two Russian Sukhoi Su-35S fighter jets and later by two Russian UAVs. The flights, which entered the Korean Air Defense Identification Zone (not recognized by either Beijing or Moscow), garnered significant press attention featuring videos showing the first instance of Russian bombers landing in China and the two Chinese bombers of the 28th Bomber Regiment landing at Vladivostok International Airport in eastern Russia.

== Organization ==
Today, the 10th Bomber Division commands three subordinate bomber regiments, the 28th, 29th, and 30th Bomber Regiments in Anhui and Jiangsu Provinces. The division headquarters comprises a Staff Department (参谋部), Political Work Department (政治工作部), and Support Department (保障部), each having subordinate second and potentially third-level departments below them. A number of principal leaders in division headquarters also form the division's Party Standing Committee (党委常委) which includes the division commander and at least two of his deputy commanders, the political commissar and at least one of his deputy political commissars, the secretary of the Discipline Inspection Committee, the division chief of staff (who directs the Staff Department), director of the Political Work Department, as well as the director of the Support Department and his political commissar.

Each of the 10th Bomber Division's three bomber regiments are led by a regimental commander, regimental political commissar, two deputy commanders, and a deputy political commissar. Within regimental headquarters are two departments, the Staff Department (previously known as the Headquarters Department) headed by the regimental chief of staff and a Political Work Division (previously the Political Division) led by a director. Although these regiments have maintenance groups, they do not have organic logistics, equipment, or support departments.

The 10th Bomber Division operates a mix of H-6 variants: the latest variant, the H-6K with new engines, flight deck, intakes, and radome; the H-6H designed to carry land-attack cruise missile (LACM); and the H-6M with four under-wing cruise missile hardpoints. Bombers of the 8th Bomber Division can be identified by tail numbers (painted on the fuselage aft of the cockpit and forward of the intake) and all have number '1' as the penultimate digit. The range of tail numbers assigned to each unit are not indicative of the actual quantity of aircraft. The division's military unit cover designator (MUCD) is Unit 94810.

- 28th Bomber Regiment at Anqing Air Base operates H-6K bombers, tail numbers 20011–20419
- 29th Bomber Regiment at Luhe Air Base operates H-6H bombers, tail numbers 20511–20919
- 30th Bomber Regiment at Luhe Air Base operates H-6M bombers, tail numbers 21011–21419

The three bomber regiments of the 10th Bomber Division oversee two to three flight groups (飞行大队). In most bomber units, some flight groups are operational with one set aside for training new pilots. These subordinate flight groups fly around eight to ten bombers and are led by a commander, political director, two deputy commanders, and a deputy political director. These flight groups, the PLAAF's basic operational air unit, each lead two to three flight squadrons (飞行中队) flying two to five bombers per and are led by a commander, political instructor, and one to two deputy commanders.

== Gallery ==
Select Photos of 10th Air Division Aircraft
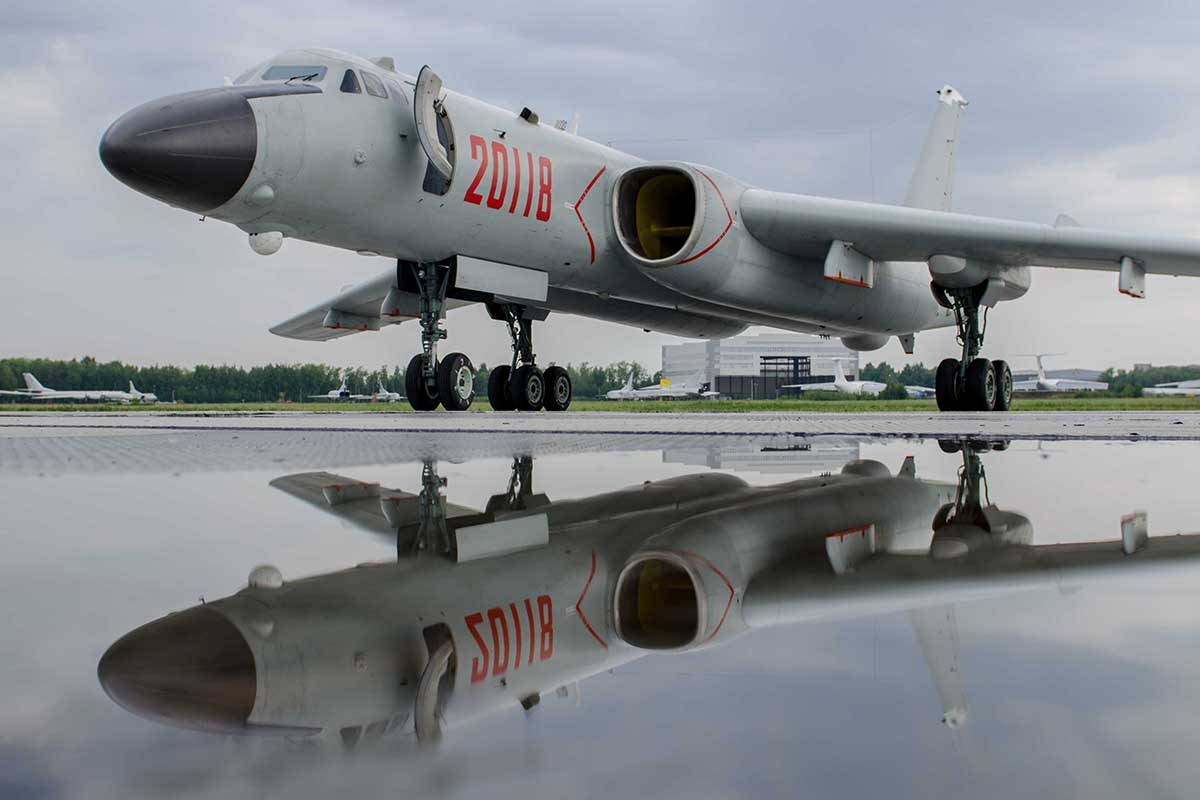
An H-6K of the 28th AR on display at Dyagilevo for Aviadarts 2018

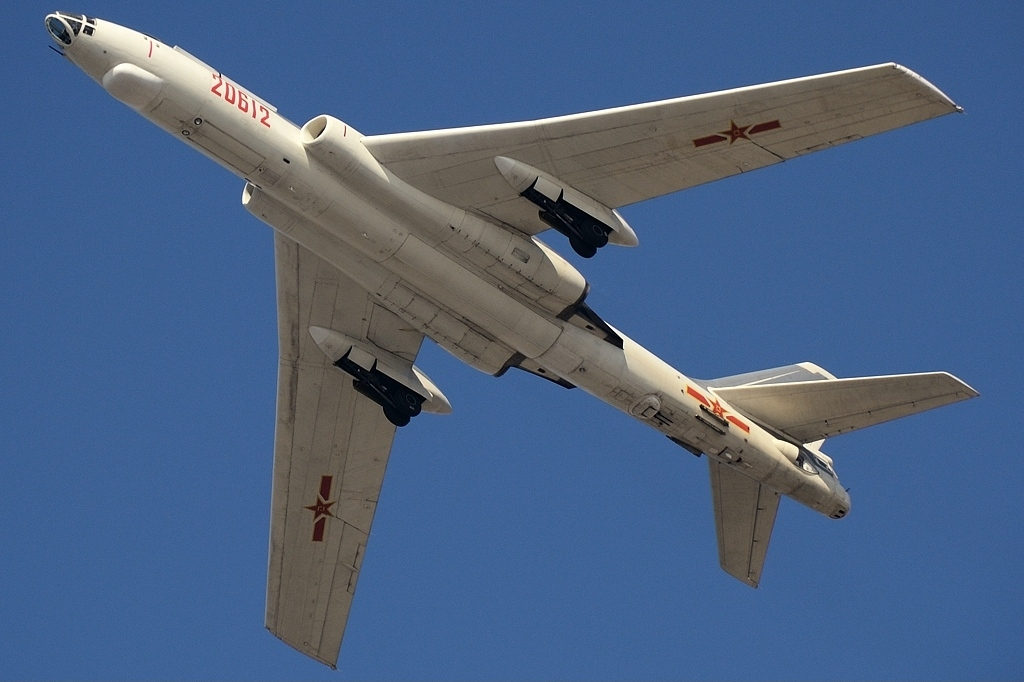
An H-6A formerly used by the 29th AR with tail and rear guns

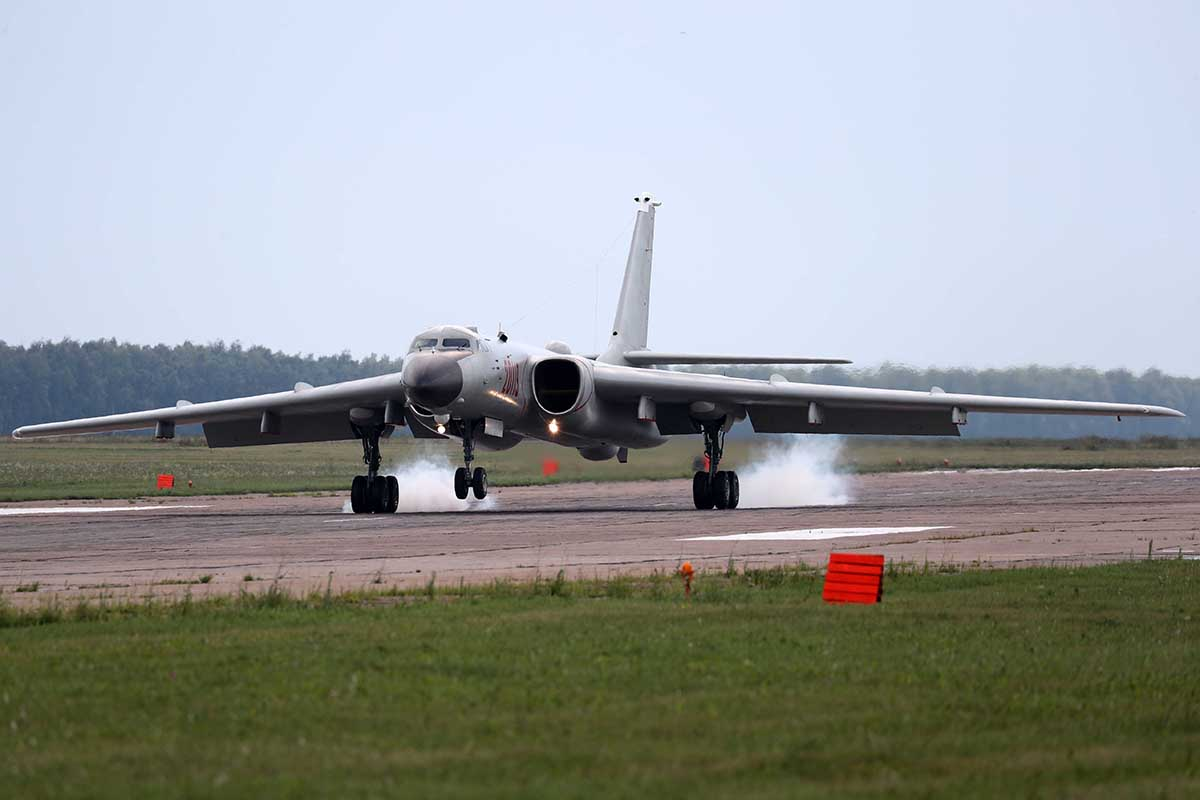
An H-6K of the 28th AR lands at Dyagilevo for 2018 Aviadarts

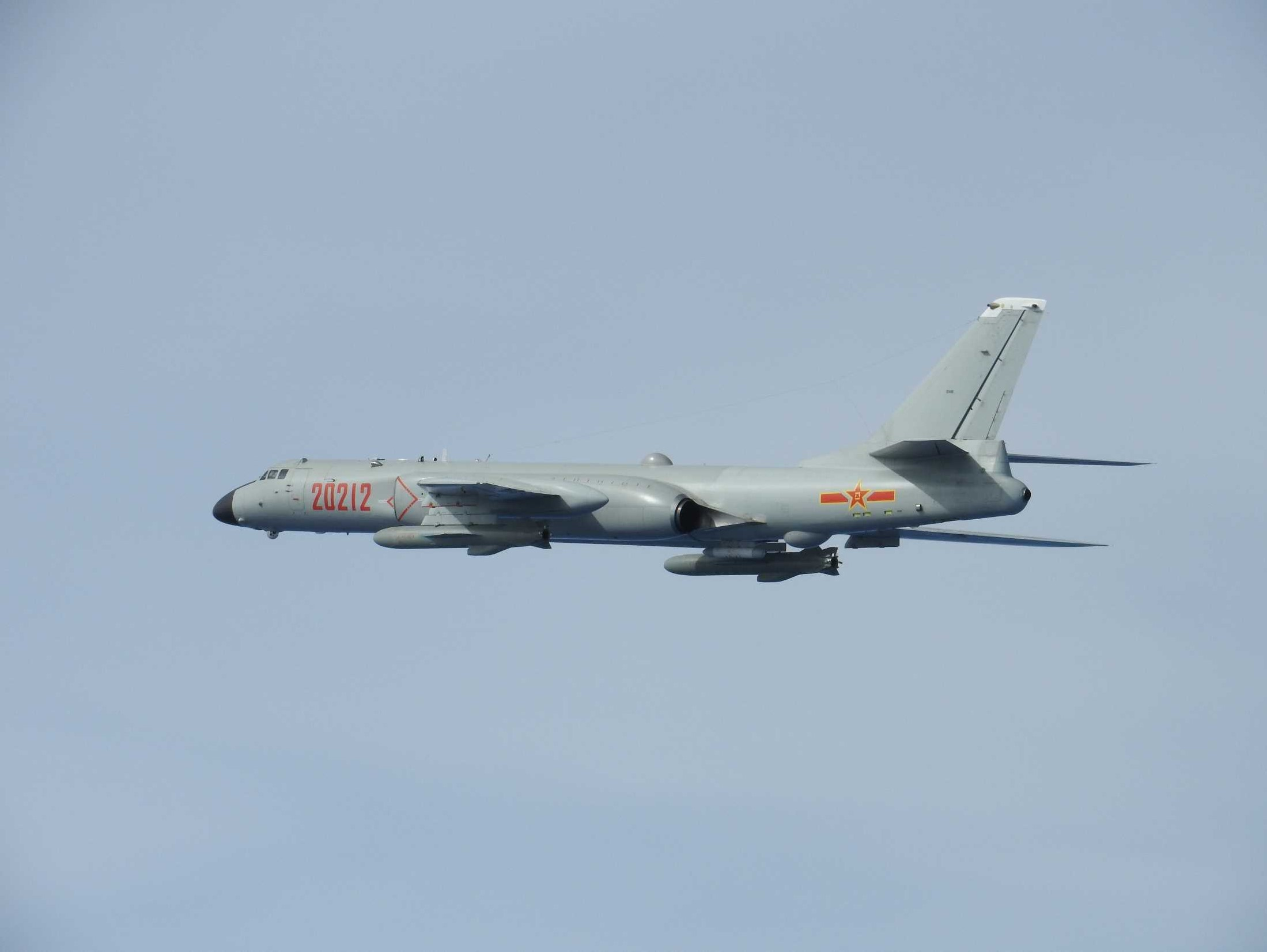
Intercepted H-6K bomber of the 28th AR carrying ordnance

== See also ==
- 8th Bomber Division (Southern Theater Command Air Force)
- 36th Bomber Division (Central Theater Command Air Force)
- 48th Bomber Division
