= Luhe-Ma'an Air Base =

Luhe-Ma'an Air Base 六合马鞍机场
- IATA: none; ICAO: none

Summary
- Airport type: Military
- Operator: People's Liberation Army Air Force
- Serves: Nanjing
- Location: Luhe, Nanjing, Jiangsu
- Opened: July 2015; 11 years ago
- Elevation AMSL: 12 m / 39 ft
- Coordinates: 32.377505°N 118.796555°E

Map
- Location of airport in Jiangsu

Luhe-Ma'an Air Base
- Simplified Chinese: 南京六合机场
- Traditional Chinese: 南京六合機場
Transcriptions
Standard Mandarin
- Hanyu Pinyin: Nánjīng Lùhé Jīchǎng

Luhe-Ma'an Air Base, also known as Nanjing Luhe Airport or Nanjing Air Base, is a military airport that has been home to the Nanjing Air Base of the People's Liberation Army Air Force since 2015, replacing the old Dajiaochang Airport. It is located in suburban Luhe District across the Yangtze River from the center of Nanjing, capital of China's Jiangsu Province.

== History ==
With the rapid expansion of the city of Nanjing, the military Dajiaochang Airport, originally far from the city, is increasingly surrounded by the urban area and restricting its development even after Nanjing Lukou International Airport opened in 1997. Since 2003 the local government and the military have been in talks on relocating the air base. In January 2006 a site for the new airport was determined and the project received approvals from the State Council and the Central Military Commission in January 2009. On 8 August 2012, construction for Luhe Airport was started in suburban Luhe District. Luhe Airport was opened in July 2015, and Dajiaochang Airport was closed on 30 July 2015.

== Operations ==
Luhe Air Base hosts the 29th and 30th Bomber Regiments of the 10th Bomber Division, the only bomber unit in Eastern Theater Command and their assigned H-6K bombers.

== See also ==
- Nanjing Lukou International Airport
- List of airports in China
- List of People's Liberation Army Air Force airbases
