= Xi'an H-6 =

Chinese strategic bomber aircraft

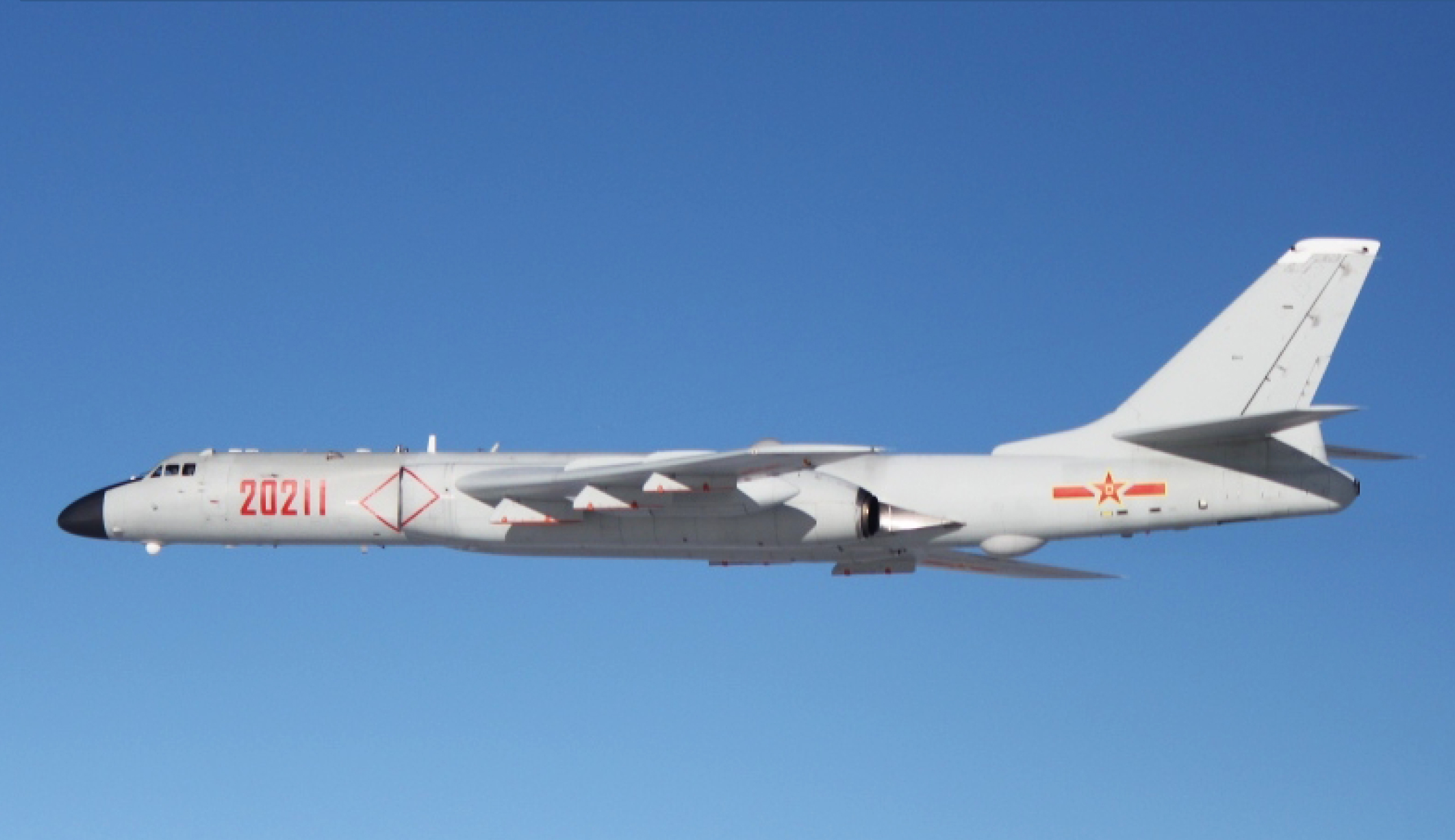
- Xi'an H-6K

General information
- Type: Strategic bomber
- National origin: China
- Manufacturer: Xi'an Aircraft Industrial Corporation
- Status: In service; in production
- Primary users: People's Liberation Army Air Force People's Liberation Army Naval Air Force; Egyptian Air Force (historical); Iraqi Air Force (historical)
- Number built: 231+ as of 2020

History
- Manufactured: 1959–present
- Introduction date: 1969
- First flight: 1959
- Retired: 1991 (Iraq); 2000 (Egypt)
- Developed from: Tupolev Tu-16

The Xi'an H-6 (Chinese: 轰-6; pinyin: Hōng-6 (Note: Also transliterated in English-language sources as the Xian H-6.)) is a Chinese twin-engine jet heavy bomber manufactured by the Xi'an Aircraft Industrial Corporation. It is a license-built version of the Soviet Tupolev Tu-16 and remains the primary bomber aircraft of the People's Liberation Army Air Force (PLAAF).

The H-6N nuclear variant is a redesigned modernized strategic bomber carrying the JL-1 air-launched ballistic missile. As of 2025, it is considered to be the only Chinese military aircraft assigned nuclear weapons: 20 bombers are assigned up to 20 missiles with the 106th Air Brigade at the airbase in Neixiang County under Central Theater Command Air Force. It is capable of aerial refueling including via the Xi'an Y-20's tanker variants. The Xi'an H-20 is expected to eventually assume this nuclear role. The initial H-6A variant dropped live nuclear weapons in nine of China's nuclear tests, and served alongside the Harbin H-5 bomber and Nanchang Q-5 fighter before their nuclear roles were removed.

The H-6K conventional variant can carry YJ-12 supersonic cruise and YJ-21 hypersonic ballistic anti-ship missiles, as well as land-attack cruise missiles including CJ-10 variants. It uses upgraded Soviet Soloviev D-30KP engines. The H-6G and H-6J are maritime variants, carrying anti-ship missiles. Since 2023, the H-6M mother ship variant has launched the AVIC WZ-8 hypersonic unmanned surveillance and reconnaissance aerial vehicle.

From 2019, H-6K and H-6N bombers began carrying out joint patrols with Russian Tu-95MS strategic bombers. As of 2025, ten such joint flights have occurred, resulting in interceptions by South Korean, Japanese, and US fighter aircraft. As a tool of power projection, H-6 movements are significant to China's disputes in the South China Sea and the political status of Taiwan.

Delivery of the Tu-16 to China began in 1958, and a license production agreement with the Soviets was signed in the late 1950s. By November 2020, the PLAAF had as many as 231 H-6s, and continued to build the aircraft, which has been extensively modified and upgraded. During the 1980s Tanker War, a theater of the Iran–Iraq War, the Iraqi Air Force extensively employed H-6s armed with the Chinese-exported C-601 anti-ship missile, damaging at least 15 Iranian oil tankers and bulk carriers. In 1991, Iraq's three remaining H-6 bombers were destroyed on the ground by the US during the Gulf War.

== Development ==
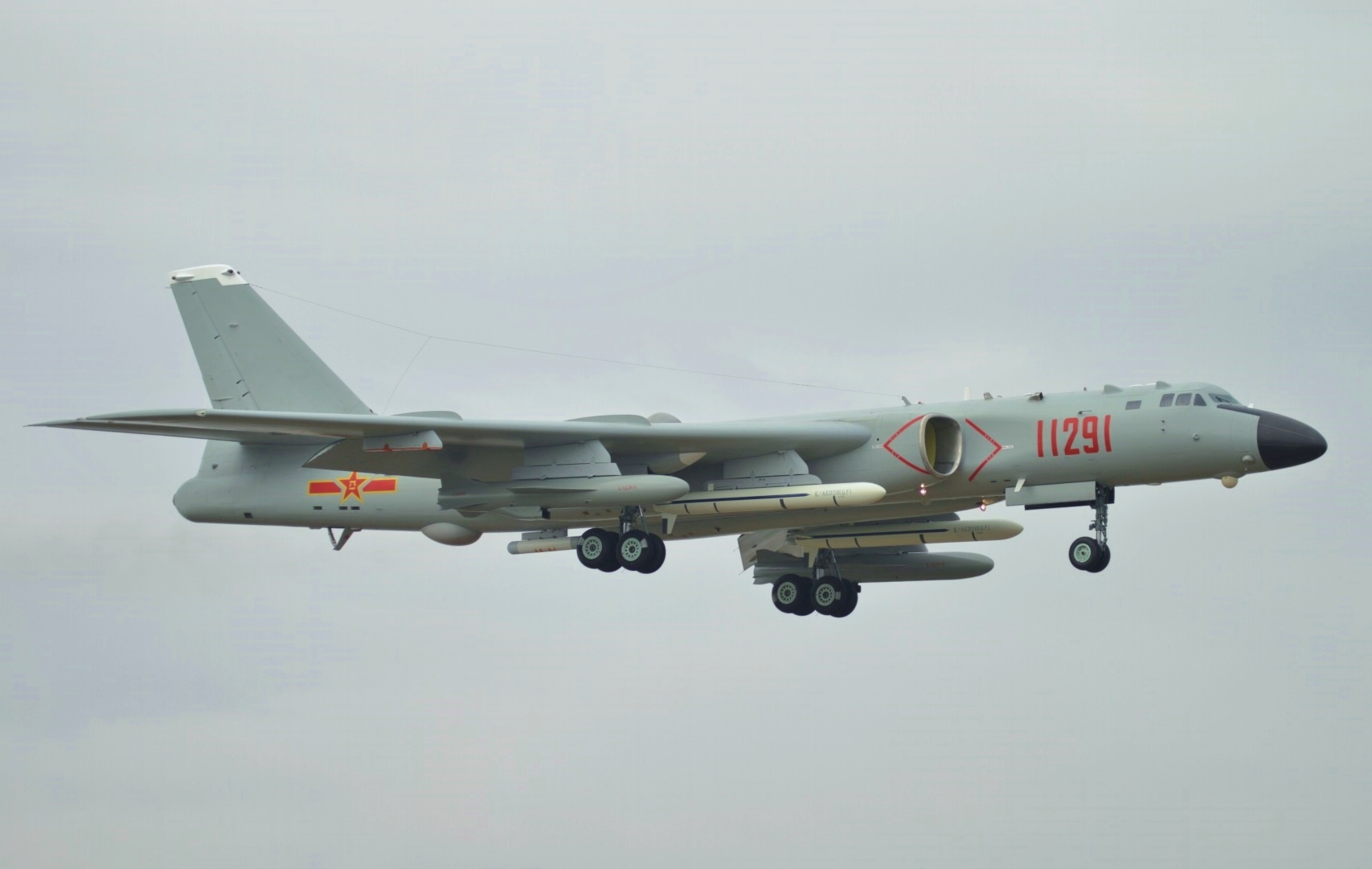
A H-6K landing at Zhuhai Jinwan Airport with cruise missiles (2018)

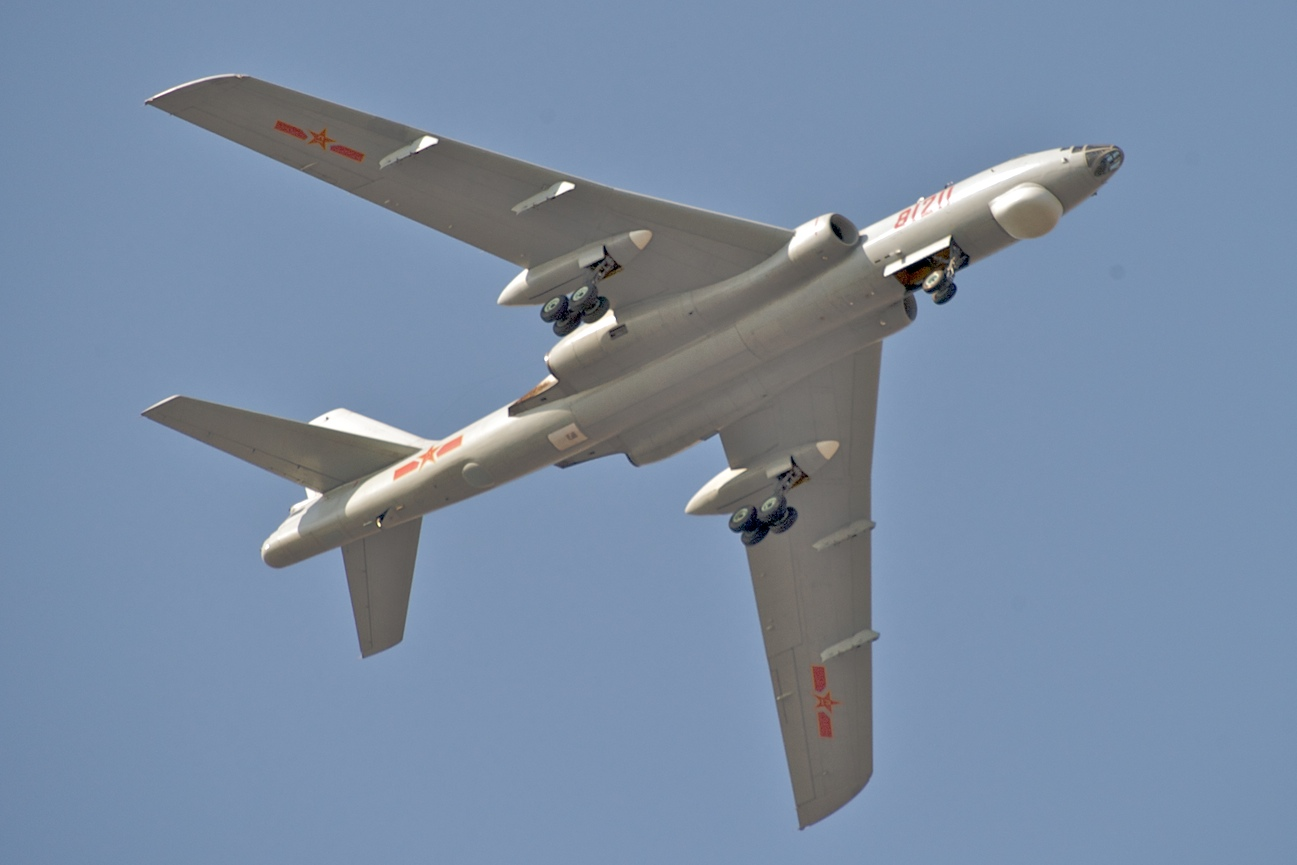
H-6M over Changzhou (2010)

Having entered service with the Soviet Union in April 1952, the Tupolev Tu-16 was one of the Soviets' earliest effective jet bombers, with over 1,500 produced through 1962. Early in 1956, the Soviet Union agreed to license production of the Tu-16 to the People's Republic of China. Signed in September 1957, the agreement granted China two production aircraft, a semi-knocked-down (SKD) kit, a complete knock-down (CKD) kit, a set of blanks, and various raw materials to jumpstart Chinese manufacture, all from Plant No. 22 in Kazan. In 1959 a team of Soviet technicians were dispatched to China to assist in the start of Chinese production where they remained until fall 1960.

The Chinese Bureau of Aircraft Industry selected the Harbin Aircraft Factory and a similar factory in Xi'an to produce the new Tu-16s, requiring major reconstruction and expansion. The aircraft and CKD were sent in May 1959 to Harbin Aircraft Factory and production began shortly after with the first Chinese-built Tu-16 assembled in only 67 days (from 28 June to 3 September 1959, using Soviet-provided CKD). Two weeks later, on 27 September the first Chinese Tu-16 completed its maiden flight and in December was transferred to the PLAAF. In 1961, the Bureau of Aircraft Industry opted to concentrate production at Xi'an and dedicate the Harbin factory to H-6 production. Having completed renovations of the Xi'an factory by 1958, production of the H-6 began in earnest with the first fully domestically produced H-6 bomber making its first flight on 24 December 1968, flown by Li Yuanyi and Xu Wenhong.

The establishment of China's H-6 production system experienced significant delays and a loss of schematics during the chaos of the Cultural Revolution.

The H-6 was used to drop nine nuclear devices at the Lop Nur test site. However, with the increased development in ballistic missile technology, the nuclear delivery capabilities that the H-6 offered diminished in importance. The CIA estimated in 1976 that the H-6 had moved over to a dual nuclear/conventional bombing role.

== Operational history ==
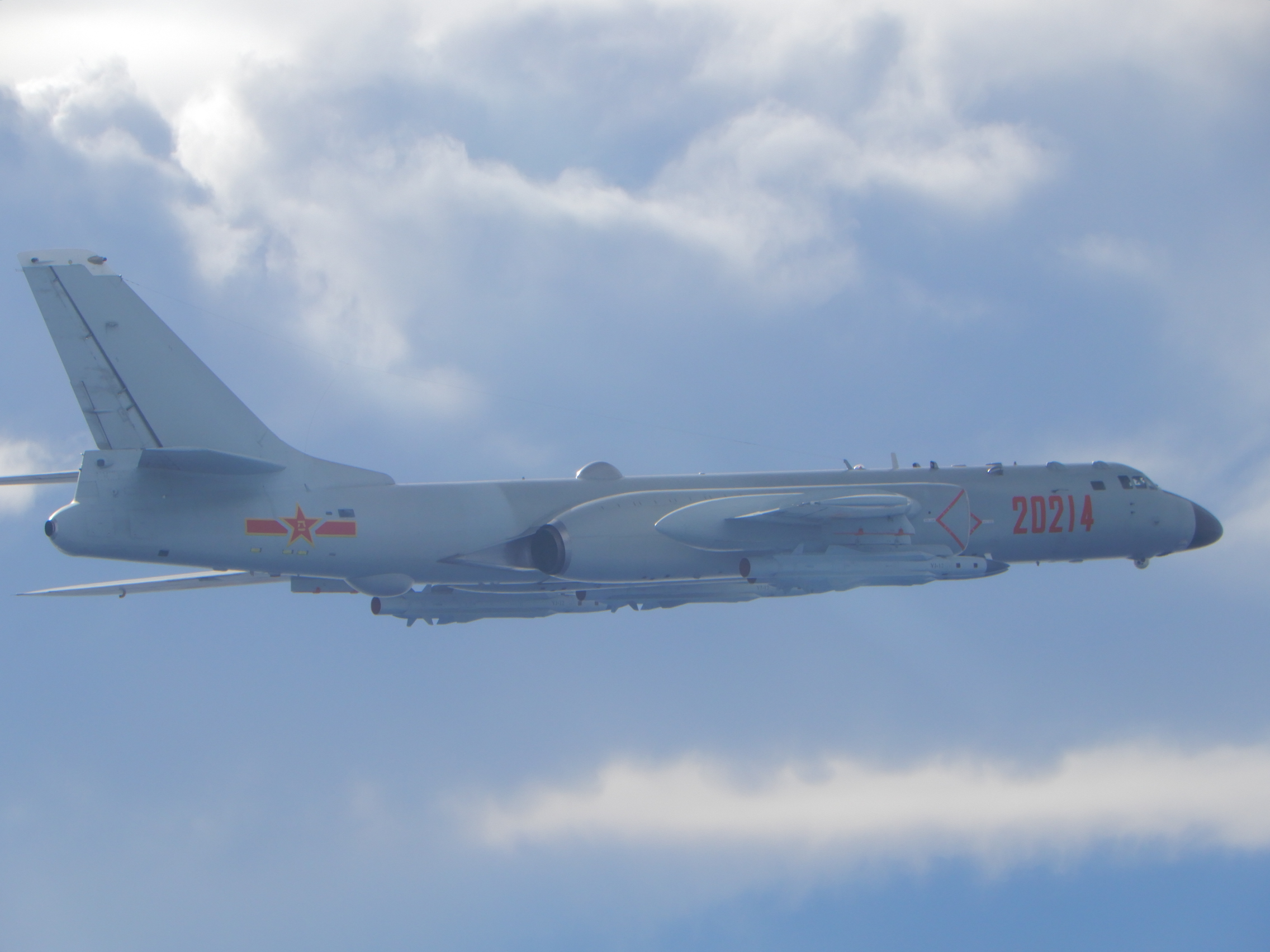
Xi'an H-6 armed with YJ-12 anti-ship missile

=== China ===
Today, H-6 variants are used by the PLAAF (primarily H-6Ks) and PLANAF (primarily H-6Js). Originally PLAAF bombers were used by the eight bomber divisions of the total fifty PLAAF air divisions. At present, PLAAF bombers are found in three conventional bomber divisions assigned to the PLA's theater commands and the nuclear 106th and 23rd Air Brigades. The three conventional bomber divisions of the PLAAF are the 10th Air Division (Eastern Theater Command), 8th Air Division (Southern Theater Command), and 36th Air Division (Central Theater Command). The 10th Air Division is likely responsible for conflicts in the Taiwan Strait or East China Sea, the 8th for conflicts in the South China Sea, and the 36th may be used as a national reserve. H-6s are garrisoned at Anqing, Luhe, Shaodong, Leiyang, Lintong, Wugong, and Neixiang Air Bases.

On 13 July 2017, the Japanese Air Self-Defense Force (JASDF) scrambled jets from Okinawa, intercepted, and photographed six Chinese H-6K bombers conducting long-range drills over the Bashi Channel and Miyako Strait through the Taiwanese, East China Sea, and Japanese Air Defense Identification Zones (ADIZ). A PLA spokesperson told Chinese news service CGTN that the aircraft were "testing actual battle capabilities over the sea" as part of "routine exercises." Two bombers were of the 8th Air Division and the remaining four of the Eastern Theater Command's 10th Air Division. Similarly, on 25 May 2018, the JASDF joined F-16 fighter jets of Taiwanese Air Force in intercepting and photographing two H-6K bombers looping around the Taiwan Island through the Bashi Channel and Miyako Strait. A photo released by the JASDF shows an H-6K of the 8th Air Division, tail number 10192.

In summer 2021, the British aircraft carrier HMS Queen Elizabeth sailed through international waters in the South China Sea, demonstrating freedom of navigation to challenge Chinese territorial claims. Chinese warnings against the act included China Central Television (CCTV) footage of an H-6 armed with YJ-12 anti-ship cruise missiles.

On 30 September 2021, a H-6N crashed in Huanglong County, Shaanxi, killing all three crew members. The China Aviation Museum states that the cause was loss of control during aerial refueling.

In 2022, at the annual China International Aviation & Aerospace Exhibition (colloquially known as the Zhuhai Airshow), an H-6K of the 8th Air Division's 24th Air Regiment (tail number 11097) was observed carrying what some western defense analysts suspect is the first air-launched model of the CM-401 anti-ship ballistic missile (ASBM).

For years, H-6K bombers of the 10th Air Division's 28th Air Regiment (AR) have routinely joined other military aircraft of the PLAAF (including J-11s, J-16s, Y-8s, Su-30s, KJ-500s, and various UAVs) in unannounced incursions into the Taiwanese and sometimes Japanese Air Defense Identification Zones (ADIZ) carrying a variety of payload munitions. These incursions have gained international attention, especially in annual joint patrols between bombers of the Chinese 28th Air Regiment and Russian Tu-95MS strategic bombers including during meetings of the Quad.

In the PLAAF, H-6 aircrews (机组; jīzǔ) consist of four personnel: the pilot in command (驾驶; jiàshǐ or 机长) who sits in the left pilot seat, the co-pilot (副驾驶; fù jiàshǐ) who sits to their right, an electronic warfare and communications officer (通信官; tōngxìn guān), and a navigator (领航; lǐngháng) bombardier (轰炸官; hōngzhà guān) who may also be referred to as a weapons control technician (武控师; wǔ kòng shī). Both the electronic warfare and communications officer and the navigator/bombardier sit directly behind the two pilots. Within a larger bomber formation, pilots may serve the role of 'lead pilot' (长机; zhǎng jī) with command over a multiple-bomber formation. When a pilot commands two multiple-bomber formations of the same type, they are referred to as the 'airborne commander' (空中指挥员; kōngzhōng zhǐhuī yuán). PLAAF pilots use the term 僚机; liáojī to describe a wingman.

=== Iraq ===
During the Tanker War, a theater of the Iran–Iraq War, the Iraqi Air Force extensively employed H-6s armed with the Chinese-exported C-601 anti-ship missile, damaging at least 15 Iranian oil tankers and bulk carriers. Iraq's three remaining H-6 bombers were destroyed on the ground at Al-Taqaddum Air Base, by the US during the Gulf War.

== Variants ==
New variants were produced in the 1990s: the H-6G was a control platform for ground-launched cruise missiles and the H-6H could carry two land-attack cruise missiles. In terms of the missiles carried, five immediate possibilities were considered by PLAAF: the indigenous HN-1, HN-2, HN-3, DH-10/CJ-10, and a variant of a Russian-designed cruise missile. The CJ-10 was apparently chosen as the main missile carried by the H-6H. Subsequently, the H-6M cruise missile carrier was also introduced, with four pylons for improved cruise missiles and a terrain-following navigation system. The H6-M has no internal bomb bay and no defensive armament.

=== H-6N ===
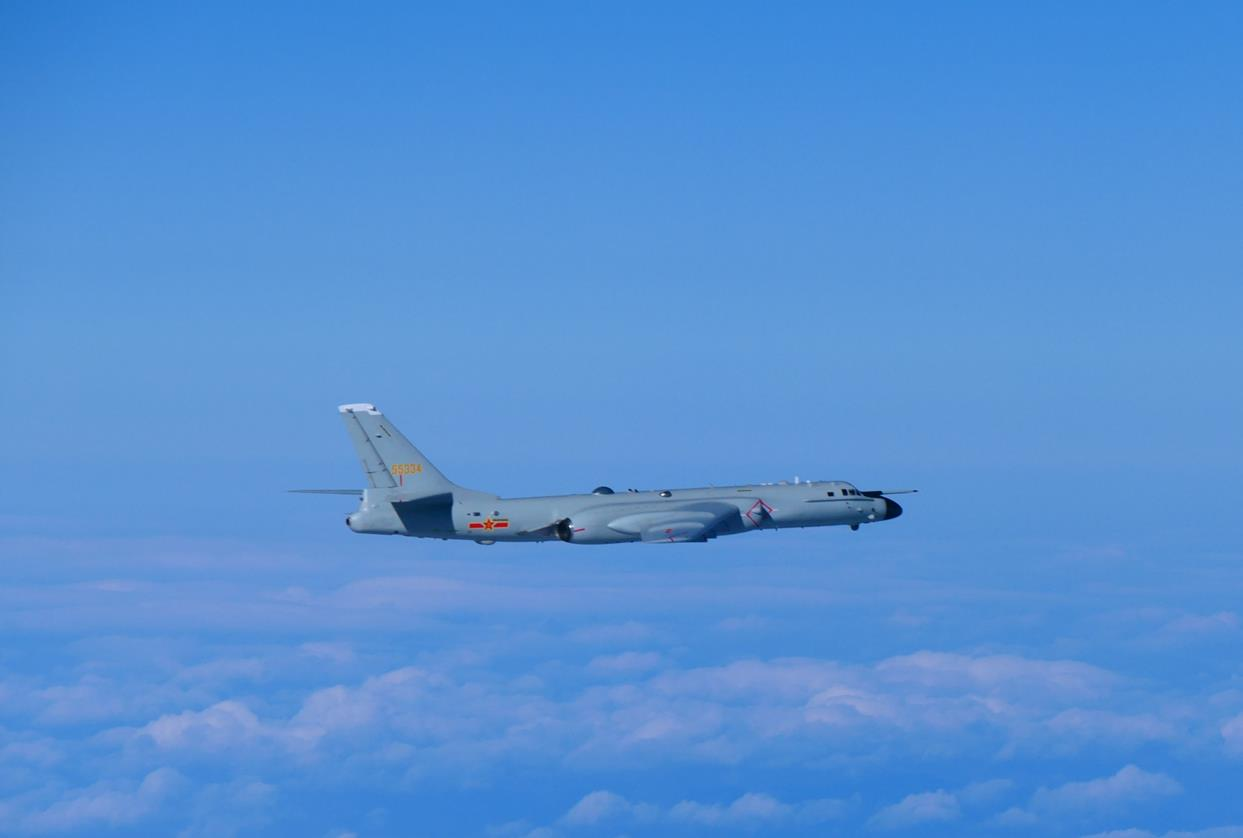
China maintains the nuclear-capable H-6N variant, assigned to carry the Jinglei-1 air-launched ballistic missile. Pictured during 2024 interception by Japan Air Self Defense Force.

The H-6N nuclear variant is a redesigned modernized strategic bomber carrying the JL-1 air-launched ballistic missile. As of 2025, it is considered to be the only Chinese military aircraft assigned nuclear weapons: 20 bombers are assigned up to 20 missiles with the 106th Air Brigade at the airbase in Neixiang County under Central Theater Command Air Force. It is capable of aerial refueling including via the Xi'an Y-20's tanker variants. The Xi'an H-20 is expected to eventually assume this nuclear role. A reshaped fuselage in place of the bomb bay supports the mounting of the air-launched ballistic missile, originally NATO-designated the CH-AS-X-13, and believed to be an air-launched variant of the DF-21 anti-ship ballistic missile. It may also carry the CJ-10K/KD-20 or KD-63 land attack cruise missiles. The bomber may have entered service in 2018. It is visually distinguishable from other variants by the refuelling probe above the nose. The H-6N is separately designated as Leishen (Chinese: 雷神; pinyin: léi shén; lit. 'Thunder God').

=== H-6K ===
The H-6K, first flying on 5 January 2007, entered service in October 2009 during the celebrations of the 60th anniversary of the People's Republic of China, and is claimed to make China the third country with an active strategic bomber after United States and Russia. With a reinforced structure making use of composite materials, enlarged engine inlets for Russian Soloviev D-30 turbofan engines giving a claimed combat radius of 3,500 kilometres (2,200 mi), a glass cockpit with large size LCD multi-function display, and a reworked nose section eliminating the glazed navigator's station in favor of a more powerful radar, the H-6K is a significantly more modern aircraft than earlier versions. Six underwing hardpoints for CJ-10A cruise missiles are added. The rear 23 mm guns and gunner position are replaced by electronic components.

The H-6K, known in mainland China as "God of War" (Chinese: 战神; pinyin: Zhànshén), is designed for long-range attacks and stand-off attacks. It is capable of attacking US carrier battle groups and priority targets in Asia. This aircraft has nuclear strike capability. While previous models had limited missile capacity (the H-6G could only carry two YJ-12 anti-ship missiles and the H-6M two KD-20/CJ-10K/CJ-20 land attack cruise missiles), the H-6K can carry up to six YJ-12 and 6-7 ALCMs; a single regiment of 18 H-6Ks fully loaded out with YJ-12s can saturate enemy ships with over 100 supersonic missiles. Although the aircraft has a new nose radome housing a modern air-to-ground radar, it is not clear if the bomber or other Chinese assets yet have the capability to collect accurate targeting information for successful strikes against point targets in areas beyond the first island chain. An electro-optical targeting system is fitted under the nose.

The WS-18 (or WS-18A) engine may be intended to re-engine the H-6K. The WS-18 – a copy or derivative of the D-30 – began development in 2007 and flight testing in 2015.

In 2015, about 15 H-6Ks were in service.

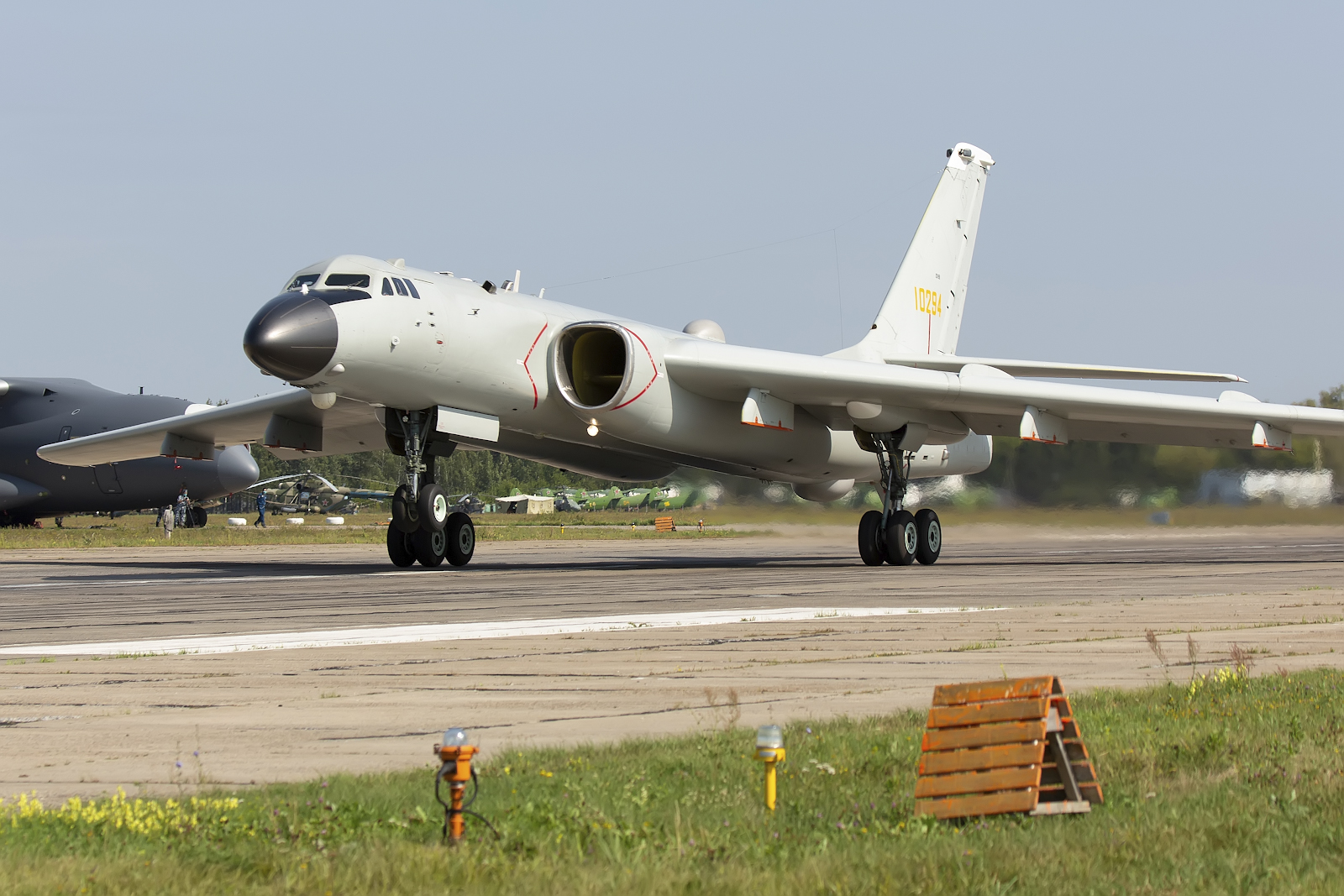
Landing Xi'an H-6K (Russia, Aviadarts, 2021)

A H-6K fitted with a refuelling probe may have first flown in December 2016. Besides extending range, a possible mission for the variant may be to launch satellites or ballistic missiles.

Defense Intelligence Agency chief Ashley confirmed that China is developing two new air-launched ballistic missiles, (CH-AS-X-13) one of which can carry a nuclear warhead.

In January 2019, Norinco announced it had tested an analog of the American "Mother of all Bombs." The weapon is carried by an H-6K and takes up the whole of the bomb bay, making it roughly 5–6 m (16–20 ft) long and weighing 10 tons. Chinese media claimed it could be used for wiping out reinforced buildings and shelters as well as clearing obstacles to create a helicopter landing zone.

In October 2022, Chinese media showcased the prospective concepts of H-6K carrying LJ-1 unmanned aerial system conducting drone swarm tactics. LJ-1 was originally designed as a target practice drone with a modular payload, which could be modified into a decoy or electronic warfare platform.

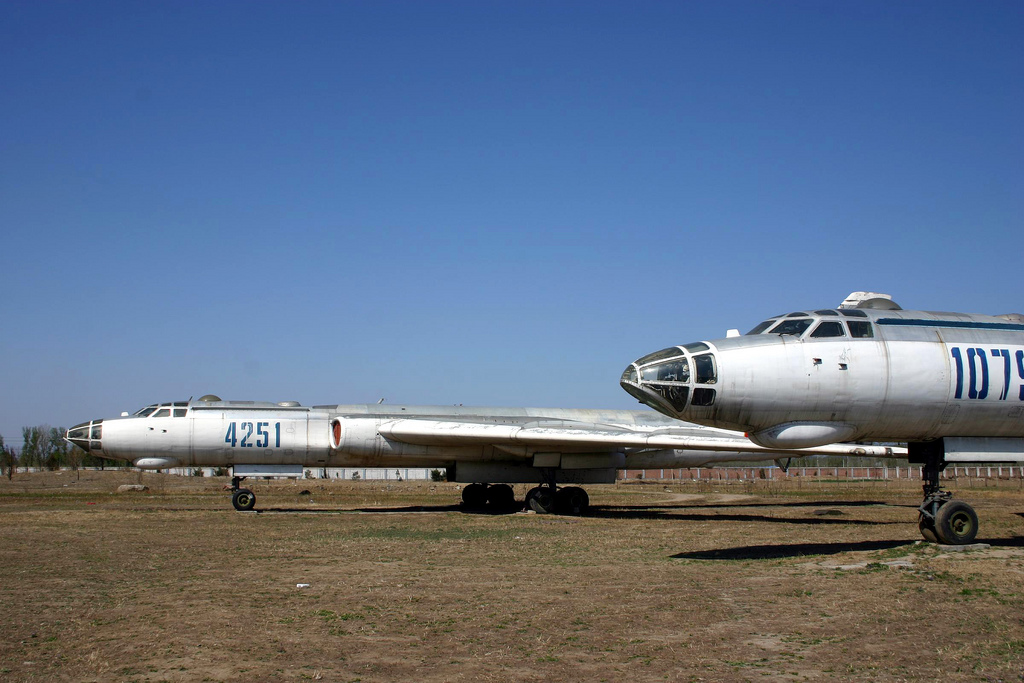
Xi'an H-6 bombers at the Chinese Aviation Museum in Beijing (2008)

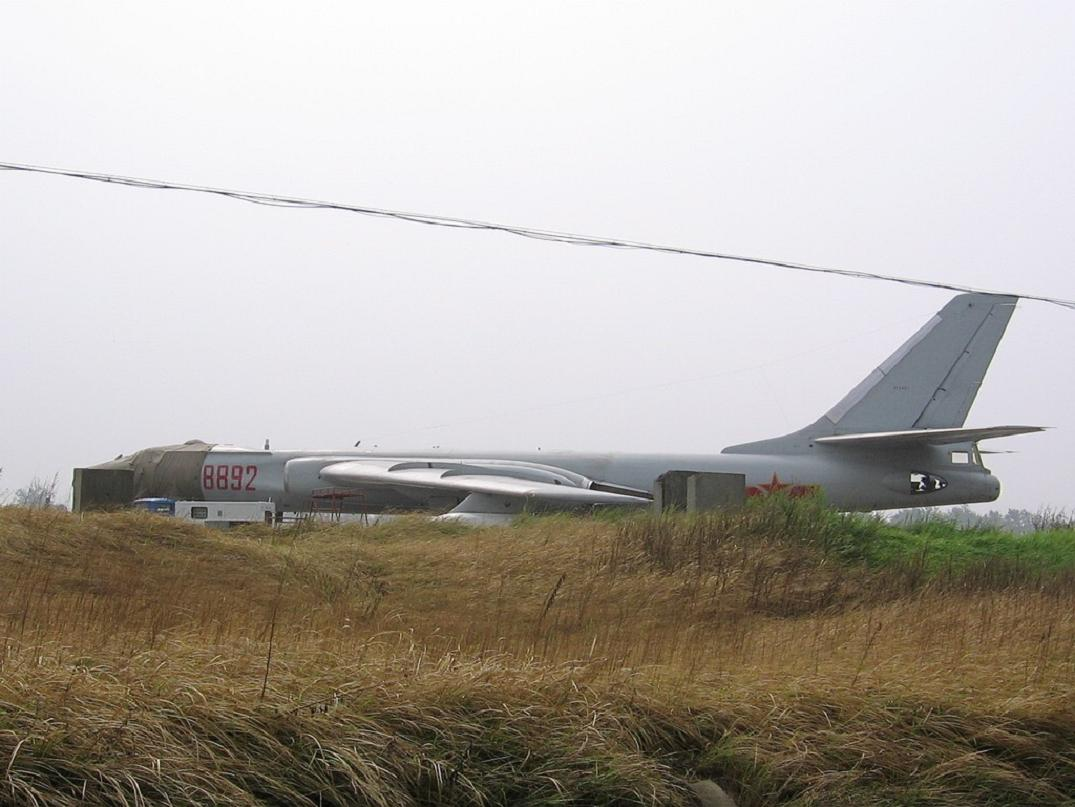
PLAAF Xi'an H-6 (2008)

=== Production variants ===
- Xi'an H-6 – (Conventional Bomber) Original, conventional bomber; Tupolev Tu-16 produced under license in China, first flew in 1959. A prototype conducted China's first aerial nuclear weapon test at Lop Nor on 14 May 1965.
- Xi'an H-6A – (Nuclear Bomber) First Chinese nuclear bomber; developed under Mission 21-511 in parallel with original H-6; modifications include heat-insulated and air-conditioned bomb bay, improved bomb release system, and monitoring equipment for nuclear testing; conducted PRC's first nuclear test on 14 May 1965.
- Xi'an H-6B – (Reconnaissance Aircraft) Developed in parallel with H-6A and outfitted with specialized equipment.
- Xi'an H-6C – (Conventional Bomber) Improved countermeasure suite; initially designated 'H-6III'.
- Xi'an H-6D – (Maritime-Strike Bomber) Anti-ship missile carrier introduced in early 1980s, armed with two air-launched C-601 (Silkworm) missiles, one mounted under each wing; fitted with larger radome under the nose and various improved systems. Later upgraded to either two C-301 supersonic anti-ship missiles, or four C-101 supersonic anti-ship missiles. An upgraded version, capable of carrying four YJ-8 (C-801) anti-ship missiles is currently under development. Initially designated H-6IV.
- Xi'an H-6E – (Nuclear Bomber) Improved countermeasures suite, entered service in 1980s.
- Xi'an H-6F – (Conventional Bomber) New designation for upgraded H-6A and H-6C. Many aircraft upgraded in the 1990s with new inertial navigation systems, doppler navigation radar and GPS receiver.
- Xi'an H-6G – (EW & C3 Aircraft) Provides targeting data to ground-launched cruise missiles, built in the 1990s. No internal bomb bay or defensive armament. Electronic-warfare aircraft with underwing electronic countermeasures pods.
- Xi'an H-6H – (Cruise Missile Carrier) Land-attack cruise missile carrier armed with two missiles, built in the 1990s. No internal bomb bay or defensive armament.
- Xi'an H-6K – (Conventional Bomber) Latest H-6 variant, re-engined with D-30KP turbofan engines of 12,000 kg thrust replacing the original Chinese turbojets. Other modifications include larger air intakes, re-designed flight deck with smaller/fewer transparencies and large dielectric nose radome.
- Xi'an H-6J – (Maritime-Strike Bomber) Modified H-6K for use by the People's Liberation Army Navy Air Force (PLANAF) to replace the H-6G; has greater payload and range with performance similar to H-6K.
- Xi'an H-6M – (Cruise Missile Carrier) Fitted with terrain-following system and four under-wing hardpoints for weapons carriage. No internal bomb bay or defensive armament. Production of this variant is believed to have resumed in early 2006.
- Xi'an H-6N – (Nuclear Bomber) Reshaped fuselage in place of the bomb bay to mount an air-launched ballistic missile, likely the CH-AS-X-13 – an air-launched variant of the DF-21 anti-ship ballistic missile. It may also carry the CJ-10K/KD-20 or KD-63 land attack cruise missiles. The bomber may have entered service in 2018. It is visually distinguishable from other variants by the refuelling probe above the nose. Separately designated as Leishen(Chinese: 雷神; pinyin: léi shén; lit. 'Thunder God')
- Xi'an HD-6 – (Electronic Warfare Aircraft) Solid nose and canoe fairing believed to contain electronic counter-measures equipment.

=== Aerial refueling variants ===
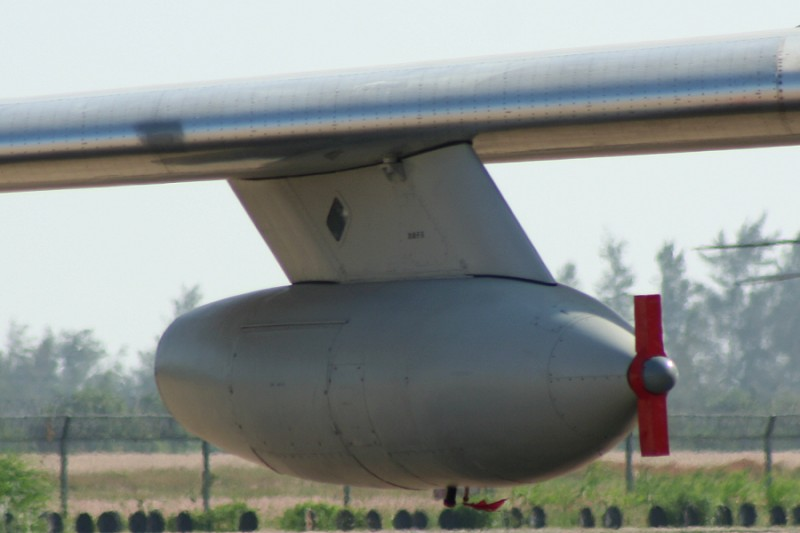
Under-wing aerial refuelling pods fitted to the HY-6U tanker variant (2008)

- Xi'an HY-6 – (Air Refueler) First successful in-flight refuelling tanker variant in Chinese service. Retained PV-23 fire control system of H-6 and thus can still be deployed as a missile launcher.
- Xi'an HY-6U – (Air Refueler) Modified HY-6 tanker in service with the PLAAF, with PV-23 fire control system and Type 244 radar deleted, and thus a dedicated refueling aircraft. Also referred as H-6U.
- Xi'an HY-6D – (Naval Air Refueler) First aerial refueling tanker for PLANAF, converted from H-6D. The most distinct difference between HY-6U and HY-6D is that HY-6U has a metal nose cone, while HY-6D still has the transparent glass nose. Like the original HY-6, PV-23 fire control system is also retained on HY-6D, which enables the aircraft also to serve as a missile carrying and launching platform.
- Xi'an HY-6DU – (Naval Air Refueler) Aerial refuelling tanker for the PLANAF, modified HY-6D, also referred as H-6DU. Similar to HY-6U, HY-6DU is a dedicated aerial refueling tanker when its PV-23 fire control system is removed from the aircraft.

=== Export variants ===
- Xi'an B-6D – (Maritime Strike Bomber) Export version of the H-6D.

=== Testbeds, prototypes and proposed variants ===
- Xi'an H-6I – Modified version powered by four Rolls-Royce Spey Mk 512 turbofan engines, originally purchased as spare engines for Hawker Siddeley Tridents in service with CAAC. Modifications included a lengthened fuselage and smaller engine nacelles with smaller air intakes in the wing roots, where the original two turbojet engines were replaced with two Spey turbofans. Two more Spey engines mounted on pylons, one under each wing, outboard of the undercarriage sponsons. Ferry range increased to 8,100 km (with standard payload), and combat radius increased to over 5,000 km (with nuclear payload); a twin 23mm cannon was mounted in the tail. Crew was six. Development began in 1970, maiden flight took place in 1978 and state certification received in the following year, but the project was cancelled in 1980 without any production being undertaken.
- H-6 Engine Testbed – One H-6, serial number # 086, was converted into an engine testbed. Remained in service for 20 years until replacement by a converted Ilyushin Il-76.
- H-6 Launch Vehicle – Proposed variant intended to launch a 13 tonne Satellite Launch Vehicle at an altitude of 10,000 m. In 2000 preliminary studies began on the air-launched, all solid propellant SLV, capable of placing a payload of 50 kg in earth orbit. Mock-up of the SLV and H-6 launch platform shown during 2006 Zhuhai Air Show.

== Operators ==
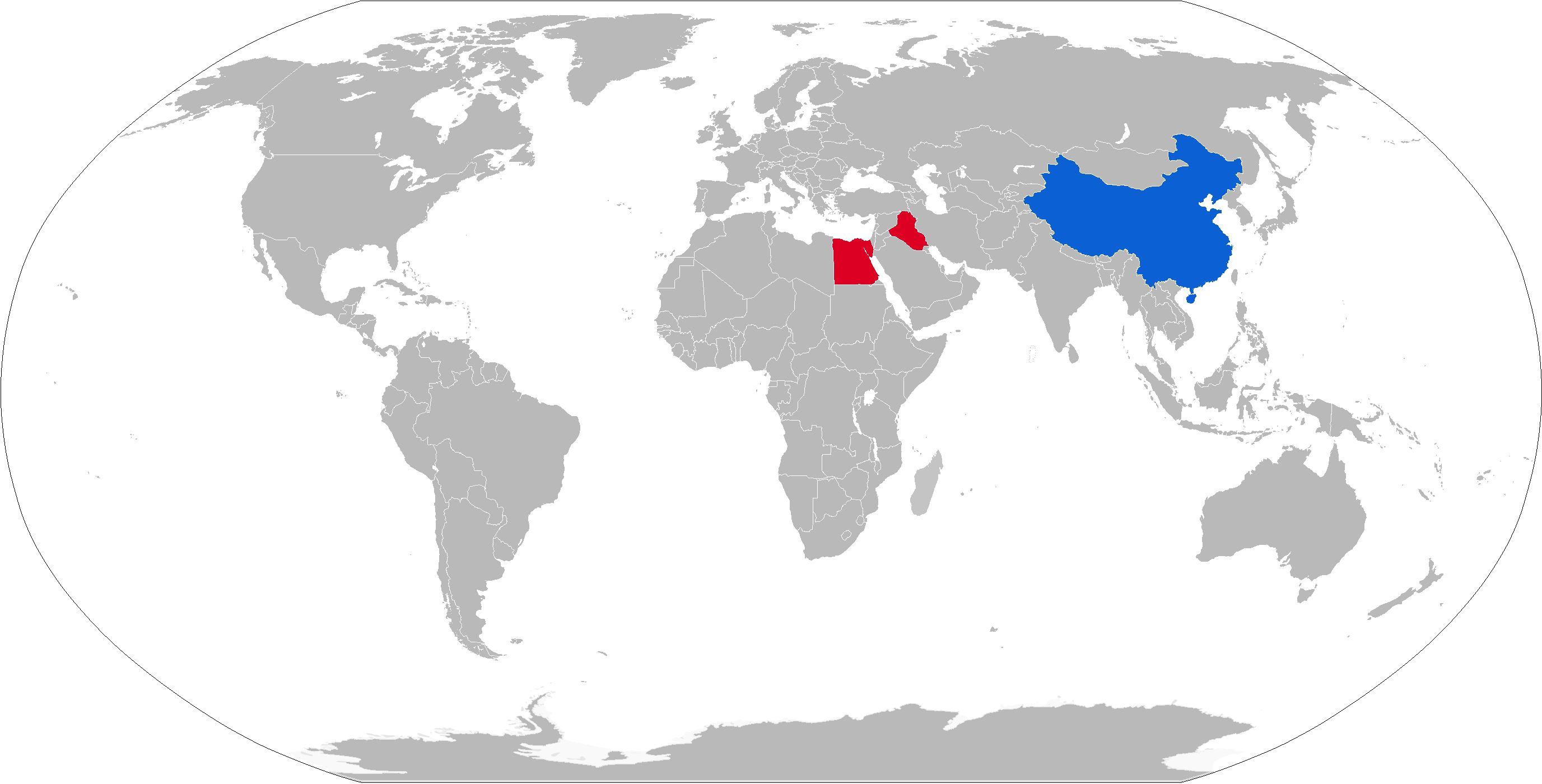
Map with Xi'an H-6 operators in blue with former operators in red

=== Current operators ===
China

- People's Liberation Army Air Force (PLAAF) — ~ 219 H-6 aircraft in active service as of April, 2025. Units operating the H-6 principally include the 8th, 10th, and 36th Air Divisions.
- People's Liberation Army Naval Air Force (PLANAF) — Operates the H-6G and H-6J naval variants.

=== Former operators ===
Egypt

- Egyptian Air Force — Previously a long-time operator of the Soviet Tu-16, after Egypt switched alliances from the Soviet Union to the United States, the Egyptian Air Force imported an undetermined number of H-6 bombers, the last of which were retired in 2000.

Iraq

- Iraqi Air Force — Near the conclusion of the Iran–Iraq War, the Iraqi Air Force received four H-6D bombers and fifty C-601 "Silkworm" anti-ship cruise missiles (ASCMs) in 1987. The first ship to be hit by a Silkworm missile was the Iranian freighter Entekhab on 5 February 1988. The Iraqi Air Force scored hits on a further fourteen tankers and bulk carriers using the H-6Ds and Silkworms. One Iraqi H-6D was shot down by an Iranian F-14 Tomcat jet during the war, the remaining three H-6Ds were destroyed by the United States bombing of Al Taqaddum Air Base in the 1991 Persian Gulf War.

== Specifications ==
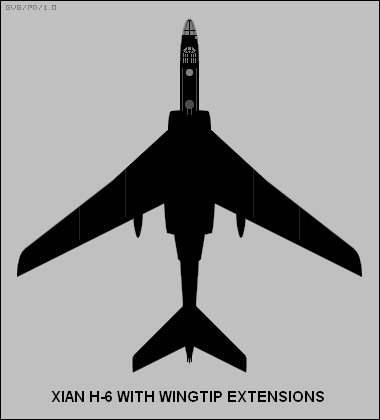
Line drawing of a H-6 with wing-tip extension

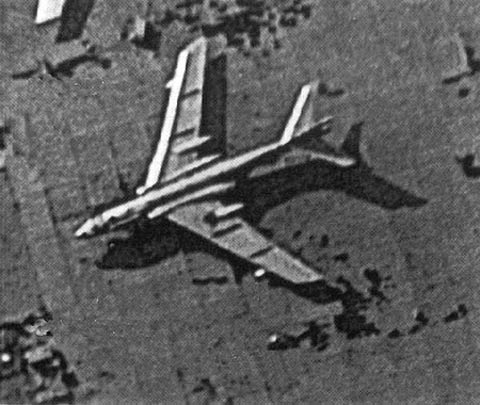
KH-11 image of a Xi'an H-6

Data from Sinodefence.com

General characteristics

- Crew: 4
- Length: 34.8 m (114 ft 2 in)
- Wingspan: 33 m (108 ft 3 in)
- Height: 10.36 m (34 ft 0 in)
- Wing area: 165 m^{2} (1,780 sq ft)
- Airfoil: root: PR-1-10S-9 (15.7%); tip: PR-1-10S-9 (12%)
- Empty weight: 37,200 kg (82,012 lb)
- Max takeoff weight: 95,000 kg (209,439 lb)
- Powerplant: 2 × Soloviev D-30KP-2 turbofan engines, 118 kN (27,000 lbf) thrust each

Performance

- Maximum speed: 1,050 km/h (650 mph, 570 kn)
- Cruise speed: 768 km/h (477 mph, 415 kn) / 0.75M
- Range: 6,000 km (3,700 mi, 3,200 nmi)
- Combat range: 3,500 km (2,200 mi, 1,900 nmi)
- Service ceiling: 12,800 m (42,000 ft)
- Wing loading: 460 kg/m^{2} (94 lb/sq ft)
- Thrust/weight: 0.24

Armament

- Guns:
  - 2× 23 mm (0.906 in) Nudelman-Rikhter NR-23 cannons in remote dorsal turret
  - 2× NR-23 cannons in remote ventral turret
  - 2× NR-23 cannons in manned tail turret
  - 1× NR-23 cannons in nose (occasional addition)
- Missiles:
  - 6× YJ-63 missile (anti-ship or air-to-surface)
  - 6× CJ-10 (air launched land attack cruise missile)
  - 6× YJ-12 (anti-ship cruise missile)
  - 1× CH-AS-X-13 (H-6N)
  - 1× JL-1 (air-launched ballistic missile) (H-6N)
  - 4× YJ-21 (anti ship ballistic missile) (H-6K)
- Bombs: 12,000 kg (26,400 lb) of free-fall weapons
  - Guided bombs
    - GB6
    - CS/BBC5
    - GB2A
    - GB5

== See also ==
Related development

- Tupolev Tu-16
- Xi'an H-6I
- Xi'an H-8

Aircraft of comparable role, configuration, and era

- Avro Vulcan
- Boeing B-47 Stratojet
- Handley Page Victor
- Vickers Valiant
