= AVIC WZ-8 =

Type of aircraft

WZ-8
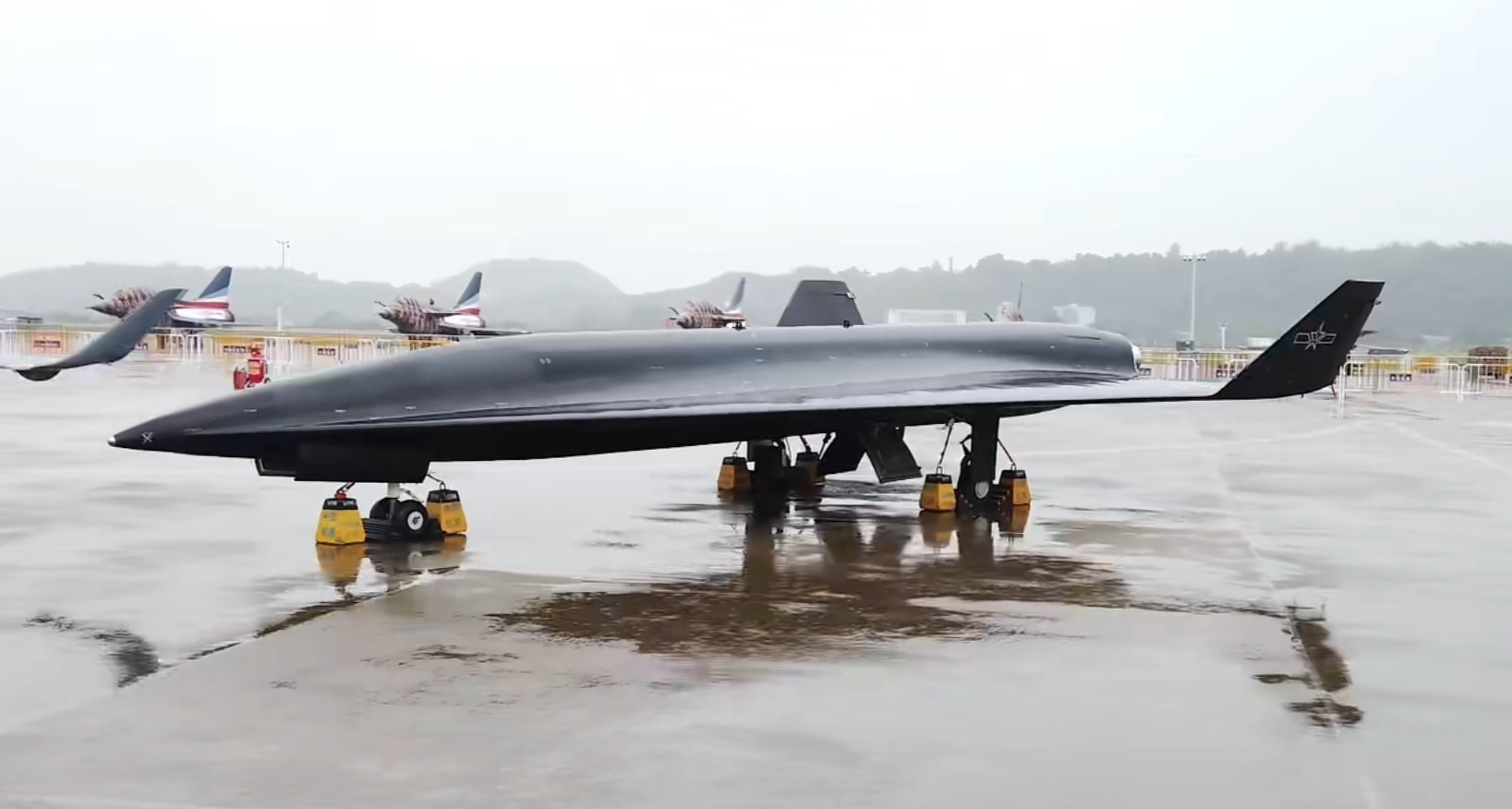
- WZ-8 at the 2022 Zhuhai Airshow

General information
- Type: Hypersonic unmanned surveillance and reconnaissance aerial vehicle
- National origin: People's Republic of China
- Manufacturer: Aviation Industry Corporation of China
- Status: In service
- Primary user: People's Liberation Army Air Force

History
- Introduction date: 1 October 2019

WZ-8 (Chinese: 无侦-8; pinyin: Wú Zhēn-bā; lit. 'unmanned recon-8') is an unmanned aerial vehicle produced by Aviation Industry Corporation of China (AVIC). Introduced during China's 70th anniversary military parade, the drone is intended to conduct strategic aerial reconnaissance across east Asia, particularly Taiwan, South Korea and Japan. Its reconnaissance capabilities reportedly include electro-optical imaging, synthetic-aperture radar, and other sensors. Some have suggested the drone will be weaponized to provide strategic anti-access/area denial capabilities. The drone cannot take off under its own power, instead it is air-launched from a Xi'an H-6M mothership once the H-6 reaches a prescribed speed and altitude.

== Design and development ==
WZ-8 was observed in Chinese Airforce experimental test bases by military analysts on satellite images. The vehicle was revealed to the public on 1 October 2019 and was subsequently displayed at Zhuhai Airshow in 2021.

WZ-8 is a hypersonic, remotely operated, high-altitude reconnaissance vehicle. The aircraft bears some superficial resemblance to the DF-ZF hypersonic glide vehicle mounted onboard DF-17 medium-range ballistic missile and the American Lockheed D-21 reconnaissance drone, albeit different in overall dimensions, propulsions, and speed. The drone is launched by a Xi'an H-6M bomber 'mothership', at its appropriate launch attitude. The WZ-8 then ignites its rocket motors, pushing the drone to its operating speed and altitude. The intended roles for the drone include general reconnaissance, pre-attack target assessment, and intelligence gathering. According to the manufacturer claims, the drone can reach supersonic speed at the cruise altitude of 50,000 metres (160,000 ft), at near-space level. US intelligence reports displayed it in hypothetical operation in a diagram, with the drone flying over Taiwan or Yellow Sea at a speed of Mach 3 and altitude of 100,000 feet (30,000 m). A drone able to sustain flight at a high altitude and speed would allow it to fill up intelligence needs in a combat environment where satellite support is unsustainable, such as repeated fly-over above specific areas of interest.

According to Chi Li-pin, director of the aeronautical systems research division of National Chung-Shan Institute of Science and Technology, Taiwan’s military-run weapons developer, the drone’s primary use won't be against Taiwan but instead US military bases in the Pacific, saying "It's a weapon for anti-access/area denial." Dean Cheng of the Potomac Institute for Policy Studies said the aircraft is intended for surveillance "not just aimed at the United States or South Korea, Japan has to worry about it. India has to worry about it. All Southeast Asia has to worry about it."

== Operational history ==
A 2023 leak of classified U.S. government documents made public a January 2023 report by the National Geospatial Intelligence Agency (NGA) and the National Air and Space Intelligence Center (NASIC) which stated that China has "almost certainly” established its first supersonic UAV unit operating the WZ-8 at Liu'an Airbase, in Dushan County, outside Lu'an. The base falls under Eastern Theater Command, the unit charged with conducting operations against Taiwan and in the East China Sea. The document stated that the drone's sensors, including electro-optical imaging and synthetic-aperture radar (SAR), could gather intelligence on Taiwan and the western side of South Korea.

The drone was reportedly deployed at Anqing Airbase in 2021. In 2023, US intelligence reported the drone and its H-6 mothership are currently operated by the Eastern Theater Command Air Force out of Liu'an Airbase in Anhui province. The H-6M bombers are reported to belong to the 10th Bomber Division.

== Operators ==
China

- People's Liberation Army Air Force
  - Eastern Theater Command Air Force
    - 10th Bomber Division, Liu'an Airbase
    - 10th Bomber Division, Anqing Airbase

== Specifications ==
Data from BulgarianMilitary

Data from Xinhua News

General characteristics

- Crew: None
- Length: 11.5 m (37 ft 9 in)
- Wingspan: 6.7 m (22 ft 0 in)
- Height: 2.2 m (7 ft 3 in)
- Powerplant: 2 × YF50 rocket motor

Performance

- Cruise speed: 3,704 km/h (2,302 mph, 2,000 kn) Mach 3
- Range: 8,000 km (5,000 mi, 4,300 nmi)
- Service ceiling: 50,000 m (160,000 ft)

== See also ==
- North American X-15
- Lockheed D-21
- Ryan Model 147
