= 8th Bomber Division =

Military unit

- 空军航空兵第八师
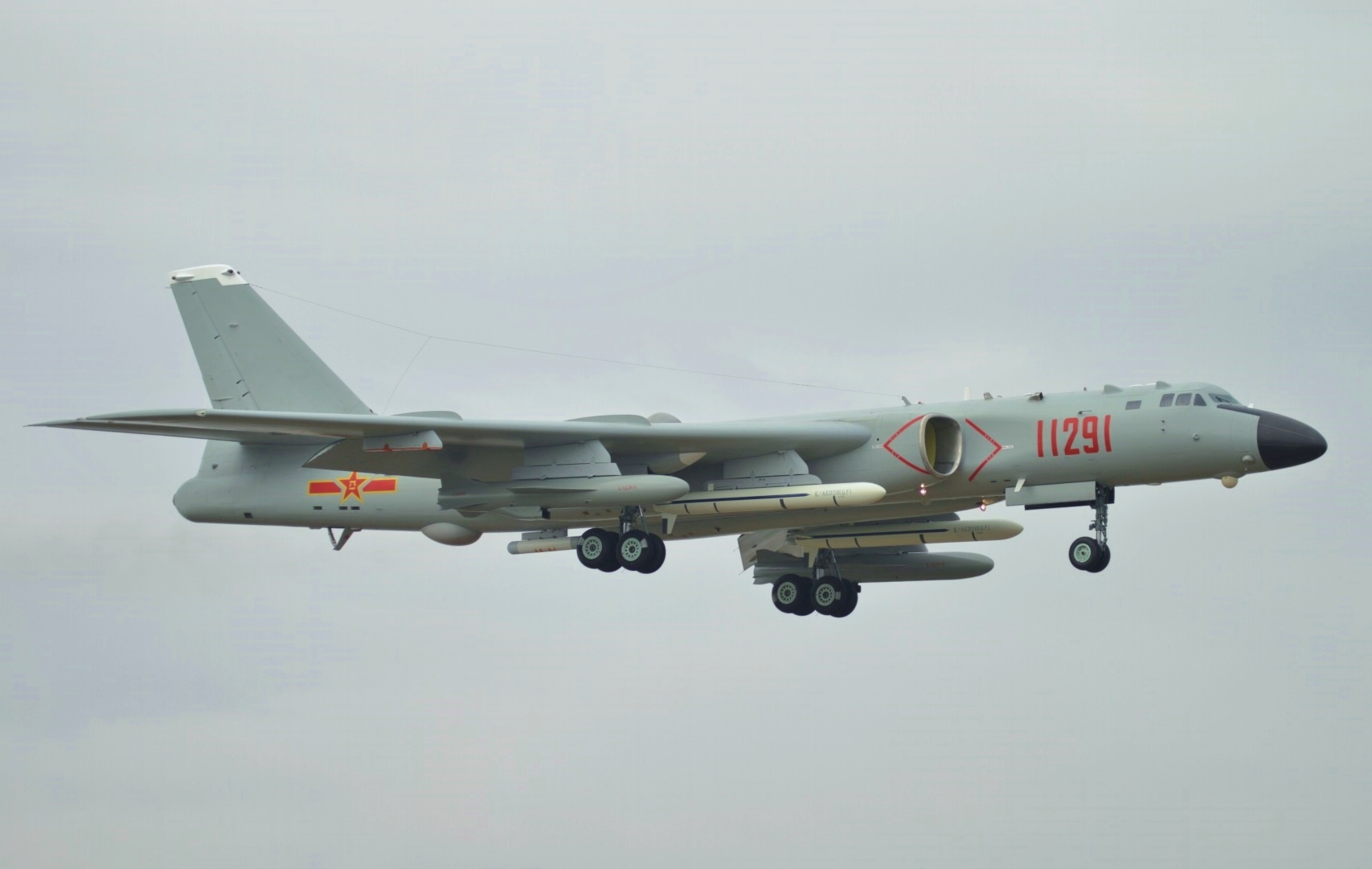
- An H-6K of the 24th Regiment, 8th Bomber Division
- Active: 27 November 1950 – Present
- Country: China
- Allegiance: Chinese Communist Party
- Branch: People's Liberation Army Air Force
- Role: Bomber
- Part of: Southern Theater Command Air Force: 8th Bomber Division
- Garrison/HQ: Leiyang, Hunan
- Nicknames: 8th Bomber Division, Unit 95291

Aircraft flown
- Bomber: H-6K
- Tanker: H-6U

The 8th Bomber Division or 8th Air Division (Chinese: 空军航空兵第八师; pinyin: Kōngjūn Hángkōngbīng Dì Bā Shī, 8th AD) of the People's Liberation Army Air Force (PLAAF) is an air formation of the People's Republic of China (PRC). Today, the 8th Bomber Division is assigned to the Southern Theater Command and operates Xian H-6 bombers. The 8th Bomber Division, the first and longest-serving bomber unit in the PRC, has been deployed in the 1950–1953 Korean War, 1958 Second Taiwan Strait Crisis, 1959 Tibetan uprising, and today conducts deterrence patrols in the South China Sea.

As one of only three bomber divisions of the PLAAF, and the only bomber division assigned to the Southern Theater Command Air Force, the 8th Bomber Division is almost certainly responsible for providing strategic bombing support capabilities with Su-30 or Su-35 fighter escorts to a conflict in the South China Sea and potentially a conflict with Taiwan.

== History ==
The 8th Bomber Division was founded in Siping, Jilin, on 27 November 1950, under the Northeast Military Region Air Force, the first bomber unit of the newly established People's Republic of China, joined by the 10th Bomber Division in January 1951. With pilots from the 12th Regiment of the 4th Composite Air Brigade (空军第4混成旅轰炸第12团), the original 8th Bomber Division comprised the 22nd and 24th Bomber Regiments, each of which commanded three flight groups (飞行大队) of 64 Tupolev Tu-2 bombers. The 8th Bomber Division recruited ground support personnel from the 504th and 510th PLAGF infantry regiments and recent graduates of the 1st and 2nd Air Force Aviation Schools. After the division was moved to the 3rd Air Corps (空三军) in Liaoning Province, it was moved to Shenyang in Liaoning on 13 October 1951.

The 8th Bomber Division, the still equipped with Tu-2 bombers, played a relatively minor role in the Korean War. The division's primary engagement in the war was the bombing of Taehwa-do Island, north of the 38th parallel and west of the peninsula. The 8th Bomber Division and ground forces of the Chinese People's Volunteer Army (PVA) had forced South Korean-allied forces south from Ka-do and T'an-do islands to Taehwa-do, primarily by intense daytime bombing raids. British second lieutenant Leo S. Adams-Acton organized a complex defense of the southernmost island of Taehwa-do principally involving the destroyer HMS Cossack and a sizable contingent of US Air Force fighters. The 8th Bomber Division had conducted relentless nighttime bombing campaigns against the defenses on Taehwa-do in an attempt to soften the resistance to their upcoming invasion. On the day Chinese communist fighters landed on the island's beaches, twelve Tu-2 bombers with an escort of sixteen La-11 fighters departed bases in China heading directly to bomb the island. Thirty-one awaiting US F-86 Sabre jet fighters dove out of the clouds to ambush the arriving 8th Division bombers. Despite an additional eighteen Chinese MiG-15 fighters joining on behalf of the Tu-2s and La-11s, the Sabres shot down three La-11s, one MiG-15, and eight of the nine Tu-2s of the 8th Bomber Division leaving the remaining bomber damaged and displaced. Following the catastrophic November 1951 loss, the Chinese Air Force made no attempts to conduct daylight raids in the Korean War. In January 1953, five months before the conclusion of the conflict, the division began training on Illyushin Il-28 bombers from the Soviet Union.

In August 1958, regiments of the 8th Bomber Division were called to Fujian Province to bolster the PLA's blockade to 'dispel the nationalist enemy from the Kinmen Islands' in the Second Taiwan Strait Crisis. On 22 August, the 22nd Bomber Regiment of the 8th Bomber Division was transferred from Wuhu, Anhui Province, to Zhangshu Airbase and on 26 October, the 24th Bomber Regiment was also transferred to Zhangshu Airbase from Nanjing, Jiangsu Province. Eight months later, in April 1959, five Il-28 bombers of the division's 22nd Bomber Regiment were dispatched to Wugong, Shaanxi Province, to join the PLA's efforts to quell the 1959 Tibetan uprising by flying over Golmud, Qinghai. According to Tibetan exiles, the PLA bombed and pillaged monasteries in Eastern Tibet and threatened to bomb Lhasa and the Dalai Lama's palace should protestors not submit.

On 11 November 1965, pilot Li Hsien-pin, navigator Li Tsai-wan, and radio operator Lien Pao-sheng of the division's 22nd Bomber Regiment defected from Jianqiao Air Base to Taoyuan Air Base, Taiwan, in an Il-28. Killing Lien Pao-sheng in the subsequent crash landing, the captured Il-28 was the fourth PLAAF aircraft to defect to the island and the first Ilyushin bomber to defect to a non-communist nation and is on display in the Republic of China Air Force Museum.

Little is known about the unit's history after 1965 until October 1999 when the 48th Bomber Division, also a bomber division, was merged into the 8th Bomber Division. With a new headquarters in Leiyang City, Hunan Province, 8th Bomber Division was assigned to the Guangzhou Military Region Air Force. In 2011, 24th Bomber Regiment, 8th Bomber Division was the first unit to receive the newly upgrade H-6K with an initial batch of twenty and an operational focus on the South China Sea, Japan, and Guam. The second batch of H-6Ks, also approximately twenty, jointed the PLAAF's 10th Bomber Division in mid-2013 with a focus on Taiwan, Japan, and South Korea. The third batch of H-6Ks entered service with the 23rd Bomber Regiment of the 8th Division in the summer of 2015. The 8th Bomber Division, along with the rest of the PLAAF is likely to continue operating the H-6K until the long-awaited H-20 flying wing strategic bomber debuts with an alleged larger payload capacity and over twice the operational range.

In the 2016 restructure of the People's Liberation Army, the Guangzhou Military Region Air Force became the Southern Theater Command Air Force. Bombers of the 8th Bomber Division have been stationed at Shaodong and Leiyang Air Bases since at least 2006. The 22nd Bomber Regiment temporarily displaced during a 2015 extension of Shaodong Air Base's apron. Shaodong Air Base opened up to civil aviation in 2021 in an effort by nearby Shaoyang City to "promote the development of military-civilian integration" and "boost regional economic development" as a regional transportation hub.

== Activities ==
In 2015, a pilot of the 8th Bomber Division unintentionally achieved the unit's first low-visibility landing in an H-6K after encountering inclement weather returning from a combat patrol mission in the South China Sea. The pilot's regimental commander remarked that no pilot of the division had prior dared attempt foul-weather take-offs or landings. This deficiency appeared to have been addressed by December 2016 when 90% of pilots from that regiment were said to be trained in low-visibility take-off and landing. The division's training has also included simulated strikes on enemy missile and radar sites.

Following the Permanent Court of Arbitration's July 2016 decision to favor Philippine sovereignty in the South China Sea and during United States Chief of Naval Operations Admiral John Richardson's visit to Beijing to discuss the issue, the Chinese Communist Party sought a show of force over the South China Sea, tasking elements of the 8th Bomber Division to patrol the disputed South China Sea territories of Fiery Cross Reef, Scarborough Shoal, Mischief Reef, Livock Reef, and Woody Island. The PLAAF released a number of photos and videos of the flights including a twenty-minute feature titled 'My Story with the God of War' in which the interviewed bomber pilot remarks how his bomber could have a "decisive impact on a conflict with just one strike."

On 13 July 2017, the Japanese Air Self-Defense Force (JASDF) scrambled jets from Okinawa, intercepted, and photographed six Chinese H-6K bombers conducting long-range drills over the Bashi Channel and Miyako Strait through the Taiwanese, East China Sea, and Japanese Air Defense Identification Zones (ADIZ). A PLA spokesperson told Chinese news service CGTN that the aircraft were "testing actual battle capabilities over the sea" as part of "routine exercises". Two bombers were of the 8th Bomber Division and the remaining four of the Eastern Theater Command's 10th Bomber Division. Similarly, on 25 May 2018, the JASDF joined F-16 fighter jets of Taiwanese Air Force in intercepting and photographing two H-6K bombers looping around Taiwan Island through the Bashi Channel and Miyako Strait. A photo released by the JASDF shows an H-6K of the 8th Bomber Division, tail number 10192. These flights around Taiwan, unique for their approach over the Bashi Channel to the island's south and exit over the Miyako Strait to its north, are the only documented observations of 8th Bomber Division bombers joining those of the 10th Bomber Division or conducting patrol missions focused on Taiwan.

In a summer 2021 attempt to demonstrate British commitment to freedom of maritime navigation and challenging Beijing's territorial claims in the South China Sea, the HMS Queen Elizabeth Carrier Strike Group, despite warnings by Chinese Communist Party press, sailed through international waters in the South China Sea. Part of these warnings included China Central Television (CCTV) airing a segment featuring ground crews strapping four YJ-12 anti-ship cruise missiles to hardpoints under the wings of an H-6K of the 24th Bomber Regiment, 8th Bomber Division, tail number 11196.

In 2022, at the annual China International Aviation & Aerospace Exhibition (colloquially known as the Zhuhai Airshow), an H-6K of the 8th Bomber Division's 24th Bomber Regiment (tail number 11097) was observed carrying what some western defense analysts suspect is the first air-launched model of the CM-401 anti-ship ballistic missile (ASBM).

== Organization ==
Today, the 8th Bomber Division commands three subordinate bomber regiments, the 22nd, 23rd, and 24th Bomber Regiments in Hunan Province. The division headquarters comprises a Staff Department (参谋部), Political Work Department (政治工作部), and Support Department (保障部), each having subordinate second and potentially third-level departments below them. A number of principal leaders in division headquarters also form the division's Party Standing Committee (党委常委) which includes the division commander and at least two of his deputy commanders, the political commissar and at least one of his deputy political commissars, the secretary of the Discipline Inspection Committee, the division chief of staff (who directs the Staff Department), director of the Political Work Department, as well as the director of the Support Department and his political commissar.

Each of the 8th Bomber Division's three bomber regiments are led by a regimental commander, regimental political commissar, two deputy commanders, and a deputy political commissar. Within regimental headquarters are two departments, the Staff Department (previously known as the Headquarters Department) headed by the regimental chief of staff and a Political Work Division (previously the Political Division) led by a director. Although these regiments have maintenance groups, they do not have organic logistics, equipment, or support departments.

The 8th Bomber Division previously used H-6A, H-6E, and H-6H bombers until the 24th Bomber Regiment began replacing its H-6H bombers with their present H-6K bombers. The 22nd did the same in 2015 while the 23rd Bomber Regiment became the only unit to operate all H-6U aerial refueling tankers. The H-6 bombers and refuelers of the 8th Bomber Division can be identified by tail numbers (painted on the fuselage aft of the cockpit and forward of the intake) and all have number '9' as the penultimate digit. The range of tail numbers assigned to each unit are not indicative of the actual quantity of aircraft.

- 22nd Bomber Regiment (Unit 95183) at Shaodong Air Base operates H-6K bombers, tail numbers 18091–18499
- 23rd Bomber Regiment (Unit 95320) at Leiyang Air Base operates H6-U refuelers or H-6K bombers, tail numbers 10591–10999
- 24th Bomber Regiment (Unit 95148) at Leiyang Air Base operates 24 H-6K bombers, tail numbers 11090–11590

The three bomber regiments of the 8th Bomber Division oversee two to three flight groups (飞行大队). In most bomber units, some flight groups are operational with one set aside for training new pilots. These subordinate flight groups fly around eight to ten bombers and are led by a commander, political director, two deputy commanders, and a deputy political director. These flight groups, the PLAAF's basic operational air unit, each lead two to three flight squadrons (飞行中队) flying two to five bombers per and are led by a commander, political instructor, and one to two deputy commanders.

The unit's true unit designator (TUD) is the '8th Air Division', however its military unit cover designator (MUCD) is 'Unit 95291'. Each unit of the PLA maintains both a True Unit Designator (TUD, Chinese: 部队番号; pinyin: bùduì fānhào) and a Military Unit Cover Designator (MUCD, Chinese: 部队代号; pinyin: bùduì dàihào). A unit's TUD is intended for internal use while the MUCD is intended to be used externally to protect and conceal the true identity of the unit.

Some speculate the presence of H-6J naval-variant bombers in the 8th Bomber Division after an apparent H-6J was photographed at Leiyang Air Base (garrison to the 23rd and 24th Bomber Regiment) bearing the tail number 11294, within the range of the 24th Bomber Regiment.

== See also ==
- 10th Bomber Division (Eastern Theater Command Air Force)
- 36th Bomber Division (Central Theater Command Air Force)
- 38th Bomber Division
