= 36th Bomber Division =

Military unit

36th Air Division
- 空军航空兵第三十六师
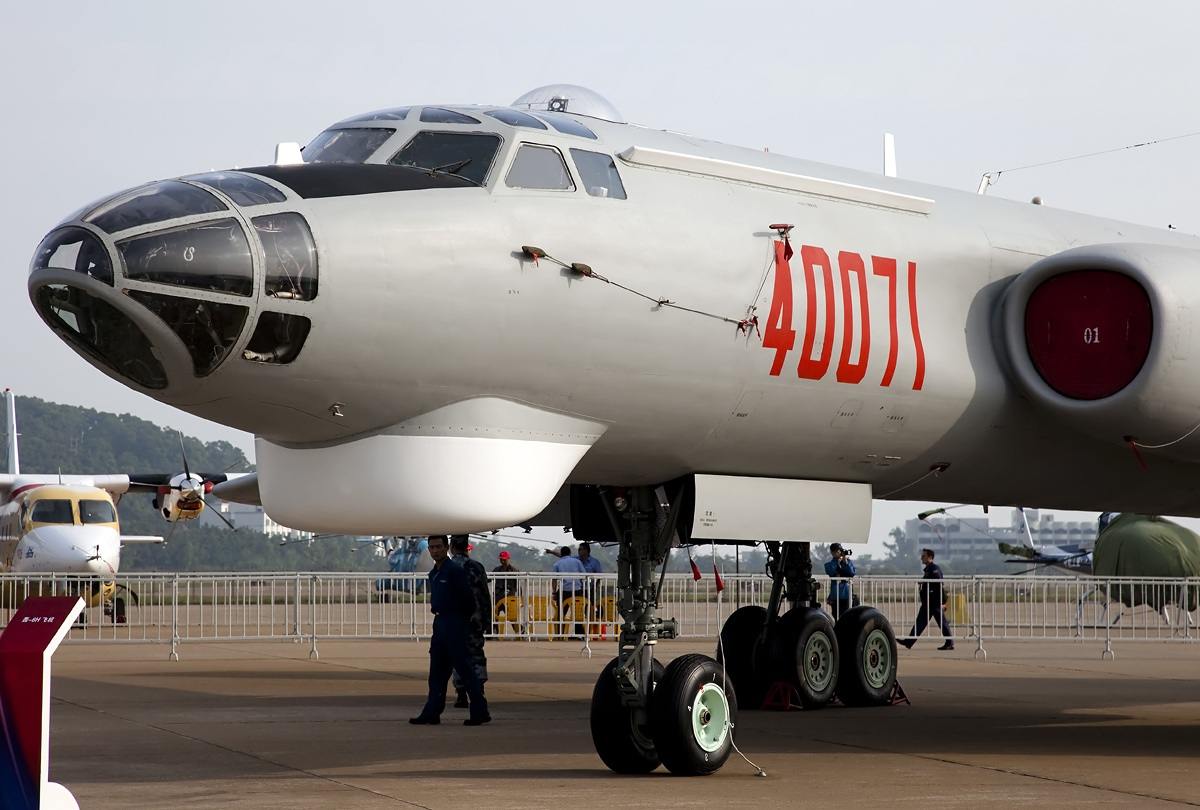
- An H-6 bomber of the 107th AR, 36th AD
- Active: 15 March 1953–Present
- Country: China
- Allegiance: Chinese Communist Party
- Branch: People's Liberation Army Air Force
- Role: Bomber
- Part of: Central Theater Command Air Force: 36th Air Division
- Garrison/HQ: Lintong Air Base, Wugong Air Base
- Nickname: 36th Bomber Division

Aircraft flown
- Bomber: Xian H-6H, Xian H-6K, Xian H-6M

The 36th Bomber Division or 36th Air Division (Chinese: 空军航空兵第三十六师; pinyin: Kōngjūn Hángkōngbīng Dì Sānshíliù Shī, 36th AD) of the People's Liberation Army Air Force (PLAAF) is an air formation of the People's Republic of China (PRC). The 36th Bomber Division is one of only three bomber divisions in the PLAAF and is presently assigned to the Central Theater Command Air Force.

== History ==
The 36th Bomber Division began as the PLAAF's 4th Independent Regiment reorganized from the 28th Air Regiment of the 10th Bomber Division (today assigned to the Eastern Theater Command Air Force) on 15 March 1953. The 4th Independent Regiment originally operated the Soviet-gifted Tupolev Tu-4 bombers, becoming the PLAAF's first heavy bomber unit. A year later in March 1954, the unit was relocated to Nanyuan Air Base (China's oldest airfield dating back to the Qing Dynasty) near Beijing until March 1955 when it was again moved to Wugong, Shaanxi, joining the Northwest Military Region Air Force (later Lanzhou). Although it is unclear why the regiment would adopt older bombers, reports of the unit's history mention receipt of Soviet Tu-2s in April 1960.

The 4th Independent Regiment was renamed to its current designation, the 36th Bomber Division on 13 April 1965 with its headquarters remaining in Wugong, Shaanxi Province. Four years later, in May 1969, the three brigades under the 4th Independent Regiment (106th, 107th, and 108th) became the 106th, 107th, and 108th Air Regiments of the 36th Bomber Division. Shortly after, the division's 106th Air Regiment (which does not exist today) was transformed into a Tu-4 electronic warfare and reconnaissance regiment and was transferred to the Wuhan Military Region Air Force (today part of the Southern Theater Command). The 106th Air Regiment would be disestablished in 2004 and its aircraft used to form an independent aerial survey regiment.

On 16 October 1964, under Project 596, China detonated its first atomic bomb (a 22 kiloton, U-235 implosion fission device) at Lop Nur Test Base in Xinjiang as part of the "Two Bombs, One Satellite" program. Only seven months later, on 14 May 1965, a Xian H-6 bomber of the 36th Bomber Division dropped a fully weaponized version of the bomb in the PRC's second nuclear test and the nation's first air-delivered nuclear detonation. Although China's first satellite, the Dong Fang Hong 1, wouldn't be launched until April 1970, China continued its progress in achieving the goals of its "Two Bombs, One Satellite" program with its first test of a hydrogen bomb (thermonuclear) on 14 June 1967, also dropped from an H-6 bomber of the 36th Bomber Division. The division would also drop a 700-kiloton atomic airburst for the PRC's Test No. 6 on 16 October 1980 (exactly sixteen years from the first test), the world's last atmospheric nuclear detonation. In 1996, a flight group of the 108th Air Regiment was honored with the title "Shenwei Flight Group" (Chinese: 神威大队; pinyin: Shénwēi Dàduì), where "Shenwei" loosely translates to invincible or divine. In 2016, following Xi Jinping's replacement of military regions with theater commands, the 36th Bomber Division was resubordinated to the Central Theater Command Air Force.

== Organization ==
Today, the 36th Bomber Division commands three subordinate bomber regiments, the 107th and 108th Air Regiments in Shaanxi Province. The division headquarters comprises a Staff Department (参谋部), Political Work Department (政治工作部), and Support Department (保障部), each having subordinate second and potentially third-level departments below them. A number of principal leaders in division headquarters also form the division's Party Standing Committee (党委常委) which includes the division commander and at least two of his deputy commanders, the political commissar and at least one of his deputy political commissars, the secretary of the Discipline Inspection Committee, the division chief of staff (who directs the Staff Department), director of the Political Work Department, as well as the director of the Support Department and his political commissar.

Both of the 36th Bomber Division's two air regiments (AR) are led by a regimental commander, regimental political commissar, two deputy commanders, and a deputy political commissar. Within regimental headquarters are two departments, the Staff Department (previously known as the Headquarters Department) headed by the regimental chief of staff and a Political Work Division (previously the Political Division) led by a director. Although these regiments have maintenance groups, they do not have organic logistics, equipment, or support departments.

- 107th Bomber Regiment at Lintong Air Base operates H-6H, H-6K, and H-6M bombers, tail numbers 40_7_ where the conjoined missing digits range 01–29, 81–99, or 51–99.
- 108th Bomber Regiment at Wugong Air Base operates H-6K and H-6M bombers, tail numbers 41_7_ where the conjoined missing digits range from 01–29.

The three air regiments of the 36th Bomber Division oversee two to three flight groups (飞行大队). In most bomber units, some flight groups are operational with one set aside for training new pilots. These subordinate flight groups fly around eight to ten bombers and are led by a commander, political director, two deputy commanders, and a deputy political director. These flight groups, the PLAAF's basic operational air unit, each lead two to three flight squadrons (飞行中队) flying two to five bombers per and are led by a commander, political instructor, and one to two deputy commanders. The 108th Air Regiment is thought to operate twelve aircraft organized into three flight squadrons. The 108th Air Regiment at Wugong Air Base in Shaanxi Province is the only Chinese bomber unit outside the newly reactivated 106th Air Regiment at Neixiang Air Base to shelter its aircraft.

== See also ==
- 8th Bomber Division (Southern Theater Command Air Force)
- 10th Bomber Division (Eastern Theater Command Air Force)
