= YJ-6 =

Chinese anti-ship missiles

YJ-6 / C-601
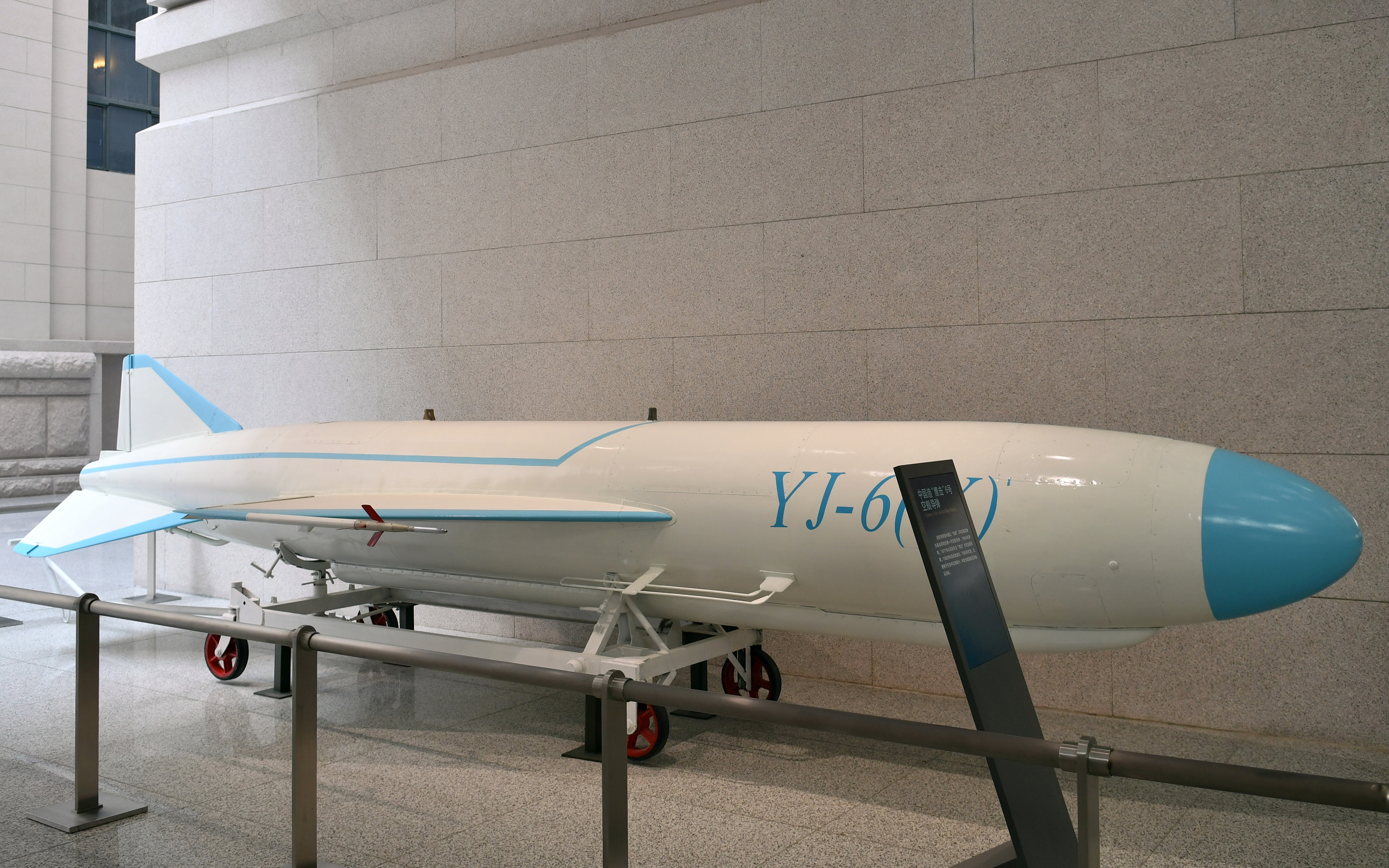
- YJ-6 missile
- Type: Anti-ship cruise missile
- Place of origin: China

Service history
- In service: 1986-

Specifications
- Mass: 2440 kg
- Length: 7.63 m
- Diameter: 0.76 m
- Warhead: 500 kg semi-armor-piercing warhead

The YJ-6 (Chinese: 鹰击-6; pinyin: yingji-6; lit. 'eagle strike 6') is a series of Chinese subsonic air-launched anti-ship missile. It is manufactured by the China Aerospace Science and Industry Corporation Third Academy. The export version is called C-601 and the NATO reporting name is CH-AS-1 Kraken.

== Development ==
YJ-6 is China's first air-launched anti-ship missile in large-scale service. It was developed from the land-based HY-2 missile with a more compact airframe for aircraft carriage and a newer active-radar seeker. The missile used liquid fuel and a large warhead inherited from HY-2. It entered service in 1986.

YJ-63, also known as KD-63 or K/AKD-63, was an air-to-surface missile developed based on the YJ-6. YJ-63 (KD-63) is an air-launched cruise missile with an electro-optical (EO) seeker, allowing man-in-the-loop terminal steering via a data link. The YJ-63 is powered by a turbojet engine.

== Variants ==
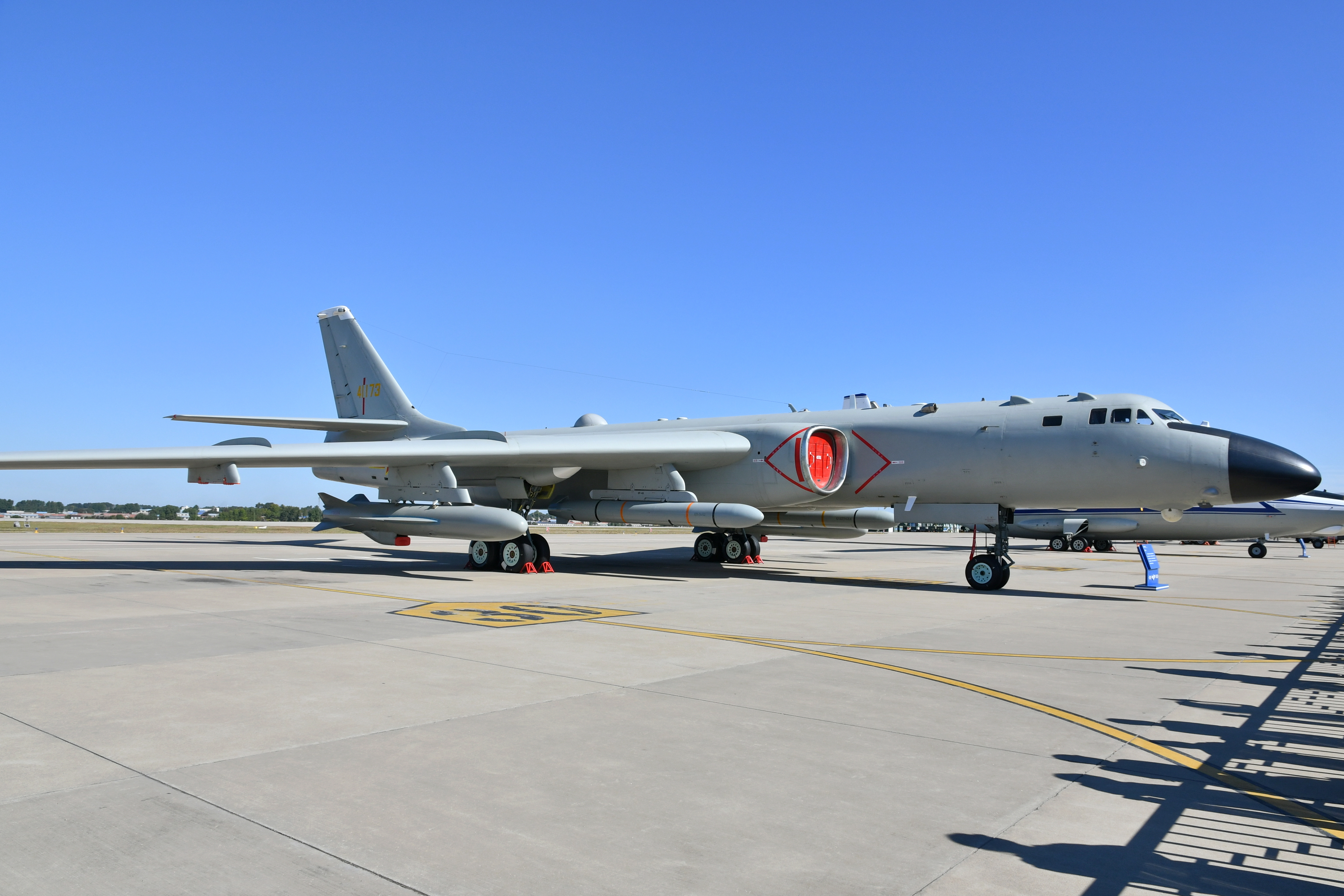
KD-63 missile carried on the H-6K bomber. The KD-63 is in the middle pylon; on the inside, the CJ-20A cruise missile

YJ-6
Base variant
YJ-61
Improved variant, range extended to 200 km.
YJ-63 (KD-63)
Air-launched LACM sharing visual characteristics of the HY-2, HY-4, and YJ-6. 200 km range.
C-601
Export variant of YJ-6
C-611
Export variant of YJ-61
C-603
Export variant of YJ-63

== Gallery ==
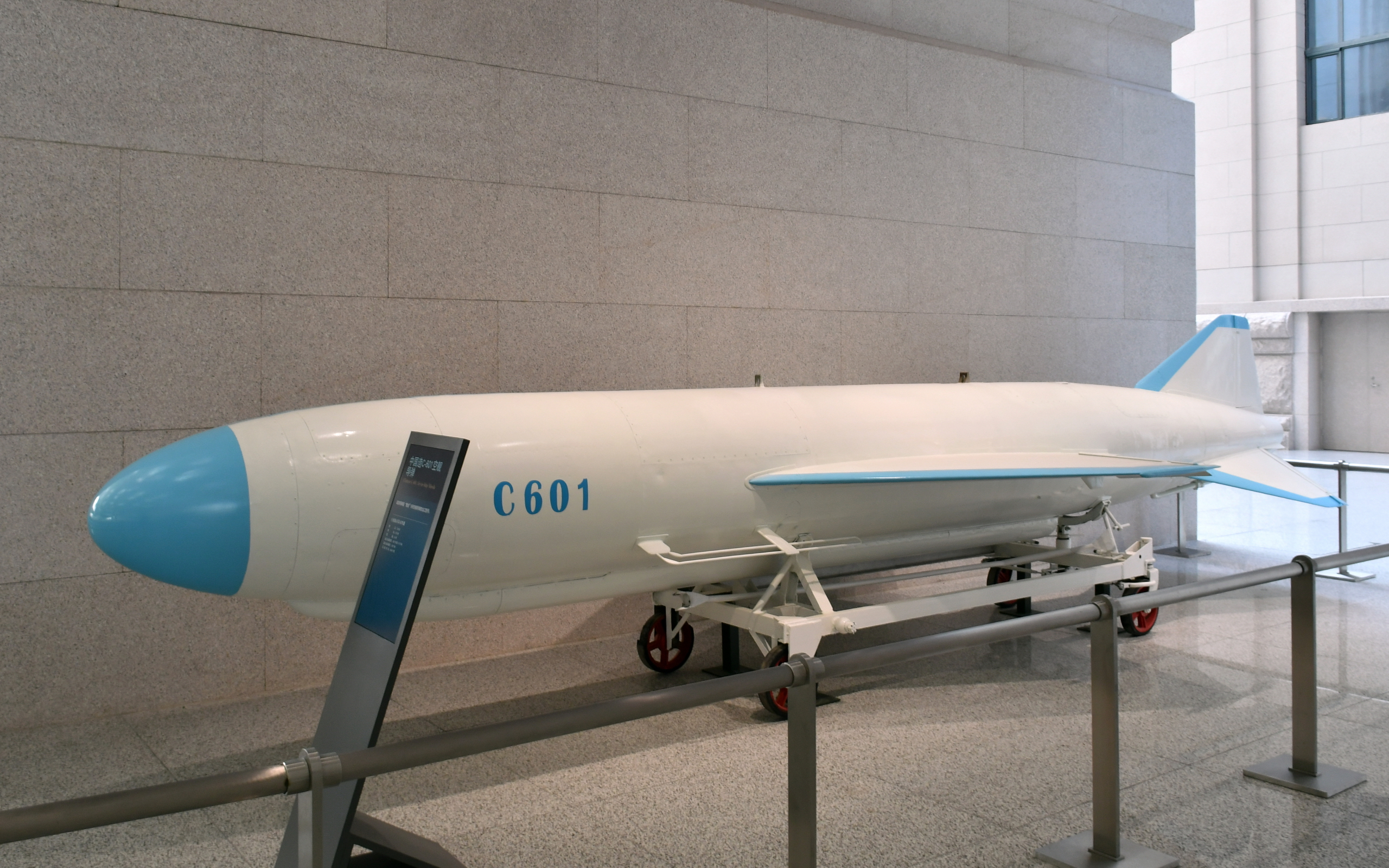
C-601, the export variant of the YJ-6

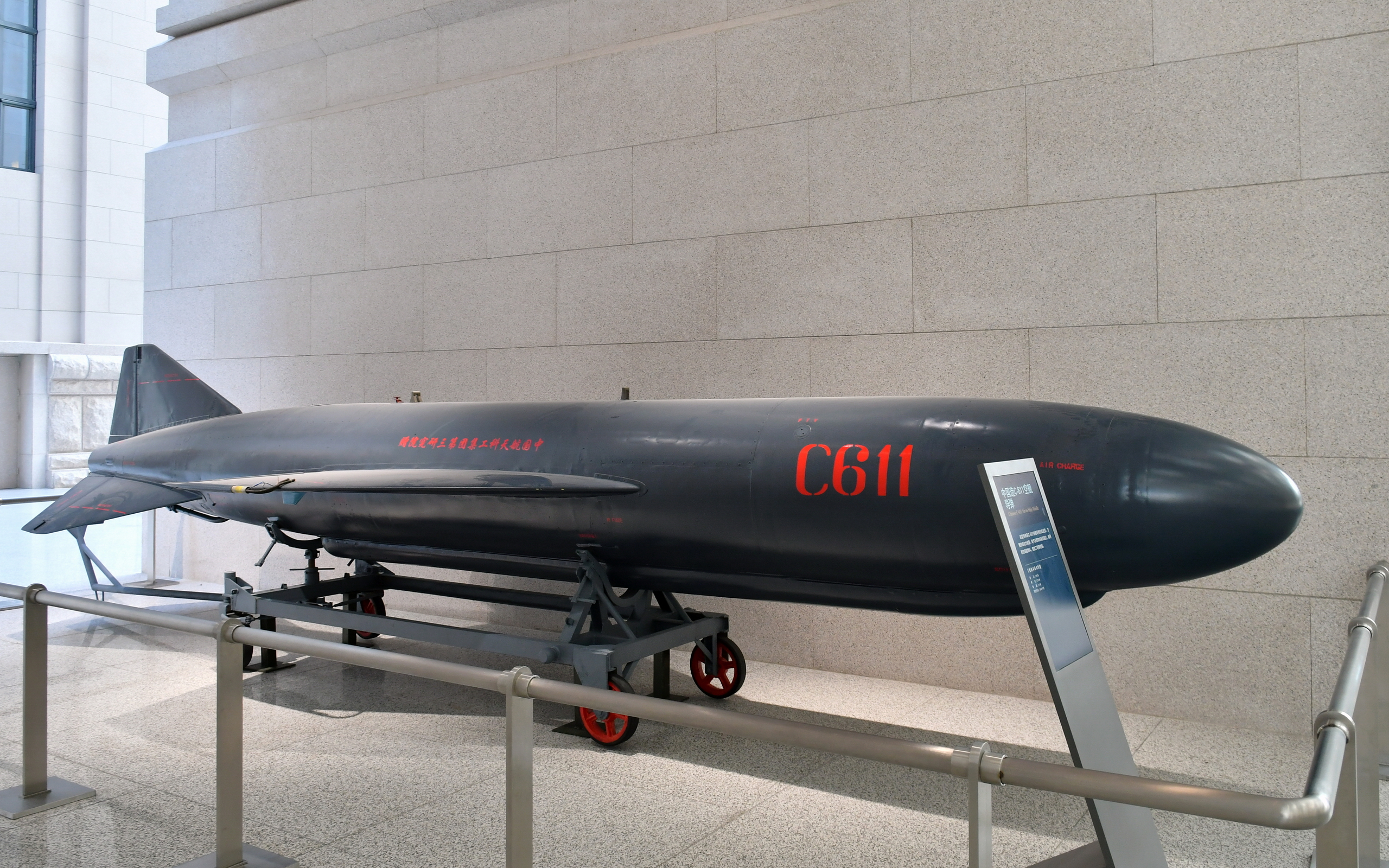
Export C-611 missile, based on YJ-61
