= Xi'an H-8 =

Chinese strategic bomber project

H-8

General information
- Type: Strategic bomber
- National origin: People's Republic of China
- Manufacturer: Xi'an Aircraft Industrial Corporation
- Status: Cancelled
- Primary user: People's Liberation Army Air Force

History
- Developed from: Xian H-6

The Xian H-8 (Chinese: 轰-8; pinyin: Hōng-8) was a Chinese bomber and a possible successor to the aging twin-engined Xian H-6 jet bomber. It is referred to as Xian H-7 in some sources. The proposed designs were reported to be an enlarged H-6 with four or six underwing engines, but the project was canceled in 1971 in early development stage.

== Development ==
On 23 March 1970 the No.603 Research Institute was tasked with developing a strategic bomber to be designated H-8, to reduce costs and development time the Xian H-6 airframe was used as a baseline. The first working sample was expected to be completed in 1973, and production was expected to be as early as in 1974.

However, the development of the H-8 paced slowly and came to a halt as major development resource was transferred to Shanghai Y-10. In September 1971, the H-8 project was canceled, whilst the H-6I was continued on as a substitute.

== Variants ==
- Xian H-8I – Two powerplant options were studied, using four WS-6J (Type 910) turbofans or six Pratt & Whitney JT-3D turbofans but no aircraft were built.
- Xian H-8II – A H-6 with increased wing span, powered by six WS-6J turbofans in evenly spaced nacelles, and possibly a re-designed flight-deck with an extended solid nose. No aircraft were built.

== Specifications ==
Data from

General characteristics

- Crew: 6
- Length: 48.5 m (159 ft 1 in)
- Wingspan: 46.47 m (152 ft 6 in)
- Height: 13.85 m (45 ft 5 in)
- Wing area: 293 m^{2} (3,150 sq ft)
- Empty weight: 63,000 kg (138,891 lb)
- Gross weight: 145,000 kg (319,670 lb)
- Max takeoff weight: 163,000 kg (359,353 lb)
- Powerplant: 4 × Shenyang WS-6J turbofan engines, 107.9 kN (24,300 lbf) thrust each

Performance

- Maximum speed: 1,000–1,050 km/h (620–650 mph, 540–570 kn)
- Cruise speed: 850–875 km/h (528–544 mph, 459–472 kn) at high altitude

800 km/h (500 mph; 430 kn) at low to medium altitude

- Range: 8,100 km (5,000 mi, 4,400 nmi) with 70,000 kg (154,324 lb) payload
- Combat range: 5,000 km (3,100 mi, 2,700 nmi)
- Ferry range: 11,000 km (6,800 mi, 5,900 nmi)
- Service ceiling: 14,000 m (46,000 ft)

Armament

- Guns: 2× NR-23 cannons in manned tail turret
- Bombs: 18,000 kg (39,683 lb) of free-fall weapons

== See also ==
- Xian H-6I
