= 48th Air Division =

Chinese military unit

The 48th Aviation Division was an air division of the Chinese People's Liberation Army Air Force that was active from 1971 to 1992.

The establishment of the division was approved by the Central Military Commission on August 4, 1970. Its formation began on January 13, 1971, following a notice issued by the Air Force Command and the Political Department. The 48th Aviation Division was formally established in Leiyang, Hunan, on April 1, 1971. the 48th Aviation Division was formally established in Leiyang, Hunan. The division's 142nd Regiment was formed from the 30th Regiment of the 10th Air Division, while its 143rd Regiment was reorganised from the 59th Regiment of the former 20th Aviation Division. Both regiments were equipped with H-5 aircraft. The division's commander was Gao Yun, and its political commissar was Zou Benhai. It was subordinate to the 12th Air Force Corps.

The 48th Air Division participated in the "Guangzi No. 3", "Guangzi No. 4", "Guangzi No. 5", and "Guangzi No. 6" exercises, as well as the Sino-Vietnamese War. Its other activities included flood-relief operations, artificial rainfall, aerial seeding for afforestation and aerial surveys.

From January 19 to 22, 1974, the Guangzhou Military Region Air Force deployed aircraft from the 48th Air Division and the 5th Reconnaissance Regiment in support of operations during the Battle of the Paracel Islands against South Vietnam. The aircraft conducted aerial photographic reconnaissance and patrols over the area.

In January 1976, following the inactivation of the 12th Air Force Corps, the 48th Aviation Division was placed directly under the Guangzhou Military Region Air Force. During a reorganisation in September 1985, the 5th Reconnaissance Regiment and the 142nd Regiment were disbanded. Orders to disband the 48th Aviation Division and the 144th Regiment were issued in September 1992. Following the division's disbandment, the 143rd Regiment became an independent unit.
