= Miyako Strait =

Waterway between Miyako and Okinawa islands

Coordinates: 25°23′N 126°25′E

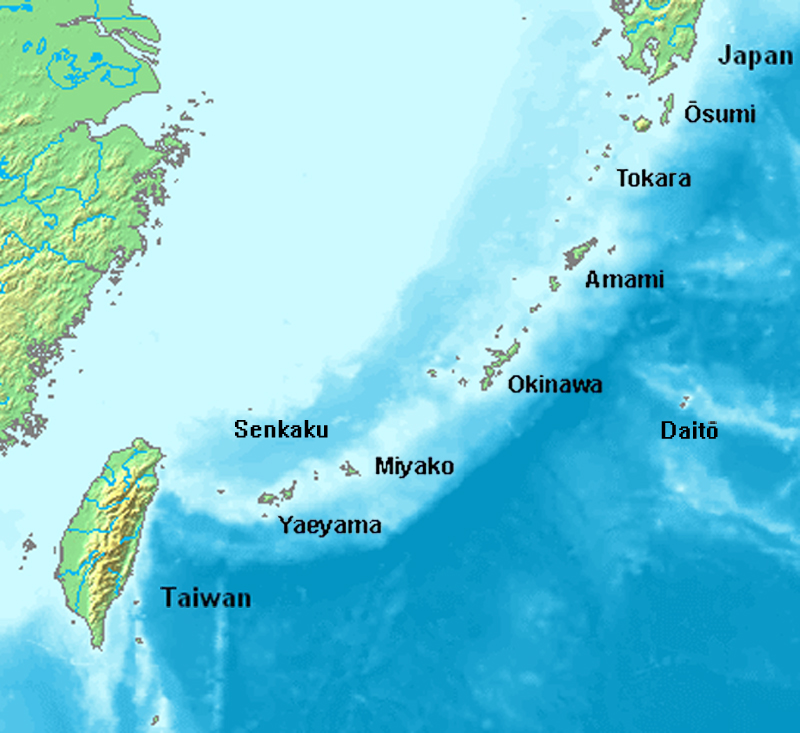
The strait is located between Miyako and Okinawa

The Miyako Strait (宮古海峡, Miyako Kaikyō; Miyako: Myāku Kaikyū), also known as the Kerama Gap, is a waterway which lies between Miyako Island and Okinawa Island consisting of a 250km-wide passageway with international waters and airspace. It is the widest strait in the Ryukyu Islands.

== Political significance ==
The Miyako Strait is of global geopolitical significance, as it is one of the few international waterways for China's People's Liberation Army Navy to access the Pacific Ocean from the East China Sea. The PLA Navy used the strait on a large scale for the first time in April 2010, an act which has since become a commonplace practice for them to conduct military exercises in the Pacific.

== Cultural significance ==
The Miyako Strait represents a cultural and linguistic split between the Southern and Northern Ryukyuan languages, with the north being more influenced by Japanese culture. The Northern Ryukyu Islands have historically been more advanced (socially, technologically, and infrastructurally) than the Southern Ryukyu Islands.
