= Anqing Tianzhushan Airport =

Anqing Tianzhushan Airport 安庆天柱山机场
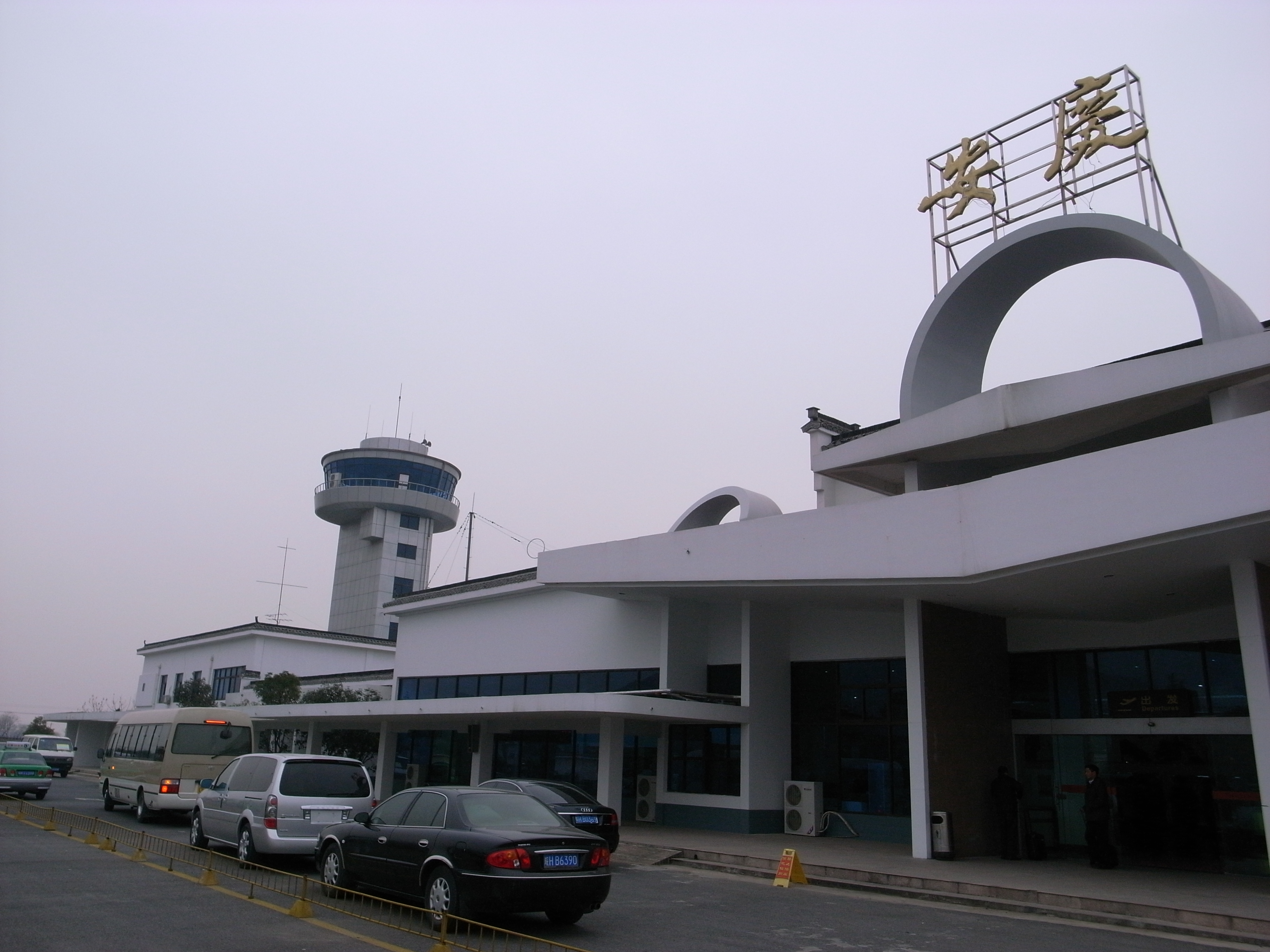
- IATA: AQG; ICAO: ZSAQ

Summary
- Airport type: Military/Public
- Operator: HNA Infrastructure Investment Group
- Location: Anqing, Anhui, China
- Coordinates: 30°34′56″N 117°03′01″E

Map
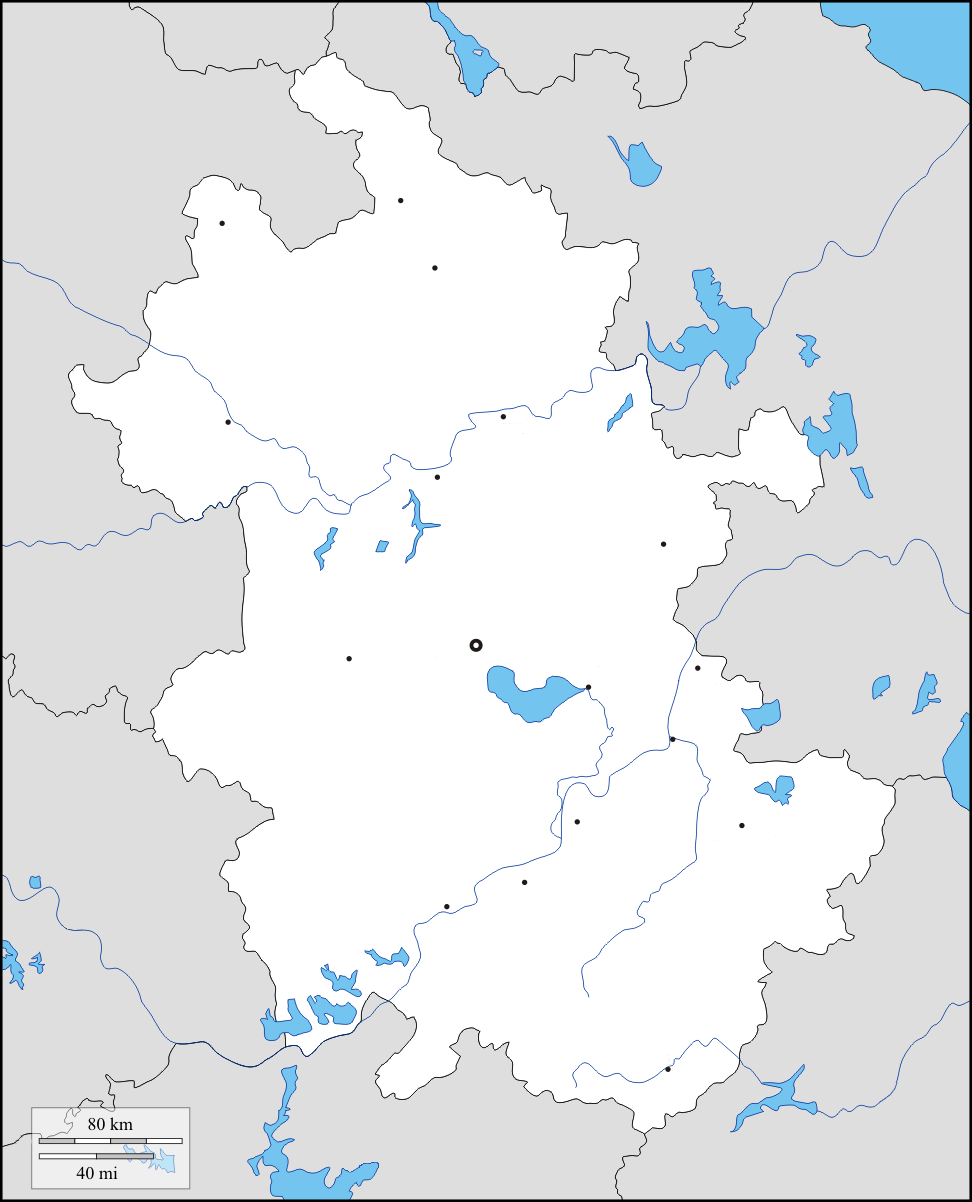
- Location of airport in Anhui

Runways
Direction	Length		Surface
Direction	m	ft	Surface
06/24	2,800	9,186	Concrete

Statistics (2025)
- Passengers: 330,601
- Cargo: 435.3 tons
- Aircraft movements: 3,248

Anqing Tianzhushan Airport
- Simplified Chinese: 安庆天柱山机场
- Traditional Chinese: 安慶天柱山機場
Transcriptions
Standard Mandarin
- Hanyu Pinyin: Ānqìng Tiānzhùshān Jīchǎng

Anqing Tianzhushan Airport (IATA: AQG, ICAO: ZSAQ) is a dual-use military and civil airport serving the city of Anqing in Anhui Province, China. It is located 6.3 kilometers (3.9 mi) north of the city. In 1991 the national government approved the conversion of the military airport to a dual-use airport. With an investment of 28 million yuan, the airport was opened to civil flights in December 1993. In 2005 HNA Group (parent of Hainan Airlines) took over the management of the airport and renamed it Anqing Tianzhushan Airport, after the nearby tourist destination Tianzhushan (Mount Tianzhu).

== History ==
The history of Anqing Tianzhushan Airport can be traced back to its seaplane airport era, Lijiawa airport and Tuolongwan airport.

=== Lijiawa airport ===
In the spring of 1931, Shanghai Eurasia Airlines set up a shipping station in Anqing, called Wan Station, which was an early seaplane airport. It ceased operation in the winter of 1932, lasting for one and a half years. In 1938, the Japanese army bombed and destroyed the Lijiawa Airport.

=== Tuolongwan Airport ===
Later, the Japanese army rebuilt the airport at Tuolongwan in the eastern suburbs. In 1953, it was converted into a civilian airport. One year later, in 1954, it was closed due to a major flood. It underwent simple repairs in 1958 and reopened the following year. Five years later, in 1964, the airport was rebuilt and became a primarily civilian airport. In 1968, Tuolongwan Airport underwent another renovation and expansion, becoming a permanent Class-A air force airport. Due to low passenger numbers, the airport was completely closed in 1979 and subsequently abandoned and became a military airport.

=== Anqing Airport ===
On February 7, 1991, the State Council and the Central Military Commission approved the conversion of the military airport into a dual-use military and civilian airport. On August 8, 1992, the civil aviation project officially started construction, and in August 1993, the project was completed and passed acceptance. The airport was officially opened to traffic on December 22, 1993. In 2005, Anqing Airport handled only 2,852 passengers and was closed again because its infrastructure could not meet the requirements for civil aviation operations.

=== Anqing Tianzhushan Airport ===
On October 18, 2005, an agreement was signed with HNA Group to establish Anqing Tianzhushan Airport Co., Ltd. The airport was renamed again as Anqing Tianzhushan Airport.

In March 2006, after Anqing Airport ceased operations, the Anqing Municipal Government invested nearly 4 million yuan in improvements to the airport, including the replacement of specialized equipment such as security checks and weather navigation systems. In October 2006, the Civil Aviation Administration of China (CAAC) Inspection Center conducted calibration flights on all communication and navigation equipment at Anqing Airport, and the calibration flights passed. The airport passed the resumption of operations acceptance. On June 28, 2007, Anqing Tianzhushan Airport, which had been closed for more than a year, resumed operations. The Anqing-Guangzhou route became the first route to resume service at the airport after its reopening.

On July 20, 2014, Anqing Tianzhushan Airport officially started infrastructure renovation, and flights were suspended. After more than six months of infrastructure renovation, Anqing Tianzhushan Airport resumed operations on February 1. The first flight was an Airbus A320, which flew from Haikou to Beijing via Anqing.

At the end of 2016, the expansion and renovation plan for the Anqing Airport terminal area was approved. In 2019, the expansion and renovation project of Anqing Tianzhushan Airport officially commenced, with the construction of a new terminal building and the expansion of the apron area. The annual passenger transport capacity increased to 1.3 million passengers, and the cargo throughput reached 5,500 tons. The new terminal was completed in November 2020 and officially opened on July 18, 2022.

The airport was temporarily closed on December 1, 2023, and flights resumed on January 30, 2024.

In 2025, the actual passenger throughput was 330,601, and the cargo throughput was 435.3 tons. Both figures are far below the targets set in the 2016 expansion and renovation plan.

== Airlines and destinations ==
Airlines	Destinations
China Express Airlines	Zhengzhou, Zhoushan
China Southern Airlines	Guangzhou
Grand China Air	Beijing–Capital
Tianjin Airlines	Shenzhen, Tianjin
West Air	Chongqing, Fuzhou

== See also ==
- List of airports in China
- List of the busiest airports in China
- List of People's Liberation Army Air Force airbases
