= List of active People's Liberation Army aircraft =

The following list of active People's Liberation Army aircraft is a list of military aircraft, currently in service with three branches of the People's Liberation Army. For retired aircraft, see list of historic aircraft of the People's Liberation Army Air Force.

== People's Liberation Army Air Force ==
| Aircraft | Origin | Type | Variant | In service | Notes |
Combat aircraft: 2,410
| Chengdu J-10 | China | multirole | J-10A | 236 | |
| Chengdu J-10 | China | multirole | J-10S | 77 | |
| Chengdu J-10 | China | multirole | J-10B | 55 | |
| Chengdu J-10 | China | multirole | J-10C | 240 | |
| Chengdu J-20 | China | stealth air superiority | J-20A/S | 330+ | |
| Shenyang J-8 | China | Interceptor | J-8F/H | 40 | Phasing out |
| Shenyang J-11 | China | air superiority | J-11/B/BS/BG | 445 | |
| Shenyang J-16 | China | strike fighter | J-16/D | 450 | |
| Shenyang J-35 | China | stealth multirole | J-35A | 54+ | |
| Sukhoi Su-27 | Soviet Union | air superiority | Su-27UBK | 32 | Older airframes slowly being phased out |
| Sukhoi Su-30 | Russia | multirole | Su-30MKK/MK2 | 97 | |
| Sukhoi Su-35 | Russia | air superiority | Su-35S | 24 | |
| Xian H-6 | China | strategic bomber | H-6A | 12 | |
| Xian H-6 | China | strategic bomber | H-6G/GMod | 27 | |
| Xian H-6 | China | strategic bomber | H-6J | 18 | |
| Xian H-6 | China | strategic bomber | H-6H/M | 40 | |
| Xian H-6 | China | strategic bomber | H-6K | 110 | |
| Xian H-6 | China | strategic bomber | H-6N | 12+ | |
| Xian JH-7 | China | fighter bomber | JH-7A | 200 | Older airframes slowly being phased out |
AEW&C
| KJ-2000 | China / Russia | AEW&C | | 4 | Chinese radar installed on an Ilyushin Il-76 airframe |
| Shaanxi KJ-200 | China | AEW&C | | 11 | |
| Shaanxi KJ-500 | China | AEW&C | | 40 | |
Reconnaissance
| JZ-8 | China | Reconnaissance | JZ-8/F | 48 | |
Electronic warfare
| Shaanxi Y-8 | China | electronic warfare | Y-8CB/DZ/G/XZ | 14 | |
| Shaanxi Y-9 | China | electronic warfare | Y-9G/XZ | 5 | |
| Shenyang J-16 | China | Electronic-warfare aircraft | J-16D | 12 | Specialized for radar jamming |
| Tupolev Tu-154 | Soviet Union | SIGINT / ELINT | Tu-154M/D | 4 | |
Maritime patrol
| Boeing 737 | United States | patrol | | 2 | |
| Shaanxi Y-8 | China | patrol | | 3 | |
Tanker
| Ilyushin Il-78 | Soviet Union | aerial refuelling | | 3 | |
| Xian H-6 | China | aerial refuelling | H-6U/H-6DU | 15 | |
| Xian YY-20A | China | aerial refuelling | | 8 | |
Transport
| Ilyushin Il-76 | Soviet Union | strategic airlifter | | 20 | |
| Shaanxi Y-8 | China | transport | Y-8C | 30 | |
| Shaanxi Y-9 | China | transport | | 30 | |
| Shijiazhuang Y-5 | China | transport | | 70 | |
| Tupolev Tu-154 | Soviet Union | transport | Tu-154M | 8 | |
| Xian Y-7 | China | transport | Y-7H | 41 | |
| Xian Y-20 | China | strategic airlifter / tanker | | 95 | |
Helicopter
| Changhe Z-8 | China | transport | | 18 | |
| Eurocopter AS332 | France | VIP transport | | 6 | |
| Eurocopter EC225 | France | VIP transport | | 3 | |
| Harbin Z-9 | China | utility | | 20 | |
| Harbin Z-20 | China | SAR | Z-20S | 15 | |
| Mil Mi-8 | Soviet Union | utility / transport | Mi-17/171 | 6 | |
Trainer aircraft: 1060+
| Chengdu J-7 | China | conversion training | JJ-7/A | 200 | |
| Guizhou JL-9 | China | jet trainer | | 45 | |
| Hongdu JL-8 | China | jet trainer | | 350 | |
| Hongdu JL-10 | China | jet trainer | | 50+ | |
| Nanchang CJ-6 | China | basic trainer | CJ-6/A/B | 400+ | |
| Xian HYJ-7 | China | two-engine trainer | | 15 | |

== People's Liberation Army Navy Air Force ==
| Aircraft | Origin | Type | Variant | In service | Notes |
Combat aircraft
| Shenyang J-11 | China | Air superiority | J-11B/BS | 50 | |
| Shenyang J-15 | China | Multirole | J-15 | 59 | |
| Shenyang J-15 | China | Multirole | J-15T | 10 | |
AEW&C
| Changhe Z-18 | China | AEW | Z-18F | 10 | |
| Kamov Ka-31 | Russia | AEW | | 9 | |
| Shaanxi Y-8 | China | AEW | KJ-200 | 6 | |
| Shaanxi Y-8 | China | AEW | Y-8J | 4 | |
| Shaanxi KJ-500 | China | AEW | | 20+ | |
Electronic warfare
| Shenyang J-15 | China | EW | J-15D | 6 | |
| Shaanxi Y-8 | China | ELINT | Y-8JB | 4 | |
| Shaanxi Y-8 | China | ELINT | Y-8X | 3 | |
| Shaanxi Y-9 | China | ELINT | Y-9JZ | 10 | |
Anti-submarine
| Shaanxi Y-9 | China | Anti-submarine warfare | KQ-200 | 25+ | |
Transport
| Bombardier CRJ200 | Canada | VIP transport | CRJ-200 | 2 | |
| Bombardier CRJ700 | Canada | VIP transport | CRJ-700 | 2 | |
| Shaanxi Y-8 | China | Tactical transport | Y-8C | 6 | |
| Shijiazhuang Y-5 | China | Transport | | 20 | |
| Xian Y-7 | China | Tactical transport | Y-7G | 2 | |
| Xian Y-7 | China | Tactical transport | Y-7H | 6 | |
Helicopter
| Changhe Z-8 | China | ASW | Z-8 | 9 | |
| Changhe Z-8 | China | Transport | Z-8J | 13 | |
| Changhe Z-8 | China | SAR | Z-8JH | 4 | |
| Changhe Z-8 | China | MEDVAC | Z-8S | 2 | |
| Changhe Z-18 | China | Transport | Z-18 | 4 | |
| Changhe Z-18 | China | ASW | Z-18F | 10 | |
| Harbin Z-9 | China | ASW | Z-9C | 14 | |
| Harbin Z-9 | China | Multirole | Z-9D | 11 | |
| Harbin Z-9 | China | SAR | Z-9S | 2 | |
| Harbin Z-20 | China | Utility | Z-20J | | |
| Kamov Ka-27 | Soviet Union | SAR | Ka-27PS | 3 | |
| Kamov Ka-28 | Soviet Union | ASW | | 14 | |
| Mil Mi-8 | Soviet Union | Transport | | 8 | |
Trainer aircraft
| Hongdu JL-8 | China | Jet trainer | | 16 | |
| Guizhou JL-9 | China | Jet trainer | | 28 | |
| Guizhou JL-9 | China | Carrier trainer | JL-9G | 12 | |
| Hongdu JL-10 | China | Jet trainer | | 12 | |
| Nanchang CJ-6 | China | Basic trainer | | 38 | |
| Xian Y-7 | China | Navigator and bombardier trainer | HY-7 | 12 | |
Unmanned aerial vehicle
| BZK-007 | China | MALE UAV | | | |
| Harbin BZK-005 | China | MALE UAV | | | |
| Guizhou WZ-7 Soaring Dragon | China | HALE UAV | | | |

== People's Liberation Army Ground Force Aviation ==
| Aircraft | Origin | Type | Variant | In service | Notes |
Attack helicopters
| Harbin Z-19 | China | Attack / Reconnaissance | | 120+ | |
| Changhe Z-10 | China | Attack / Multirole | | 200+ | |
Utility helicopters
| Harbin Z-9 | China | Utility | Z-9WZ | 120+ | |
| Mil Mi-17 | Russia | Utility | Mi-17/Mi-17-1V/Mi-17-V-5/Mi-17-V-7 | 88 | |
| Harbin Z-20 | China | Utility | Z-20T | 40 | |
Transport helicopters
| Changhe Z-8 | China | Heavy transport | Z-8A/B/L | 135 | |
| Mil Mi-17 | Soviet Union | Medium transport | Mi-171 | 140 | |
| Sikorsky S-70 | United States | Medium transport | S-70C2 | 19 | |
| Harbin Z-20 | China | Medium transport | | 150 | |
| HC120 Colibri | France / China | Light transport | | 15 | |
| Changhe Z-11 | China | Light transport | | 53 | |
Fixed-wing transports
| Xian Y-7 | China | Transport | | 2 | |
| Shaanxi Y-8 | China | Tactical transport | | 2 | |
| Shaanxi Y-9 | China | Transport | | 2 | |
UAVs
| Guizhou BZK-007 | China | MALE UAV | | | |
| CASC BZK-008 | China | | | | |
| Aisheng BZK-006 | China | | | | |
| Harbin BZK-005 | China | MALE UAV | | | |
| Shenyang BZK-009 | China | | | | |
| CASC CH-4B | China | HALE UAV | | 5+ | |

== See also ==
- List of active People's Liberation Army Air Force aircraft
- List of unmanned aerial vehicles of China
- Lists of currently active military equipment by country
- People's Liberation Army Air Force
- People's Liberation Army Navy Air Force
- People's Liberation Army Ground Force Aviation

== Sources ==
- Hoyle, Craig; Fafard, Antoine (10–16 December 2019). "World Air Forces Directory". Flight International. Vol. 196, no. 5715. pp. 26–54. ISSN 0015-3710.
- The International Institute for Strategic Studies (2021). The Military Balance 2021. Routledge. ISBN 978-1-032-01227-8.
- The International Institute for Strategic Studies (2022). The Military Balance 2022. Routledge. ISBN 978-1-032-27900-8.
- International Institute for Strategic Studies, ed. (2025). The Military Balance 2025. London: Routledge. p. 245-246. ISBN 978-1-041-04967-8.
- The International Institute for Strategic Studies (24 February 2026). The Military Balance 2026. London: Routledge. ISBN 978-1-040-93228-5.
- Tirk, Eli; Salisbury, Daniel (7 May 2024). PLAN Anti-Submarine Warfare Aircraft - Sensors, Weapons, and Operational Concepts (Report). China Maritime Report. US Naval War College China Maritime Studies Institute.
