= List of active People's Liberation Army Air Force aircraft =

The following is a list of military aircraft currently used by People's Liberation Army Air Force. For a list of current aircraft in all branches of the People's Liberation Army, see here.

== Aircraft ==
| Aircraft | Origin | Type | Variant | In service | Notes |
Combat aircraft: 2,880
| Chengdu J-10 | China | Multirole | J-10A | 236 | |
| Chengdu J-10 | China | Multirole | J-10S | 77 | |
| Chengdu J-10 | China | Multirole | J-10B | 55 | |
| Chengdu J-10 | China | Multirole | J-10C | 240 | |
| Chengdu J-20 | China | Stealth Air superiority | J-20A/S | 300-350 | |
| Shenyang J-8 | China | Interceptor | J-8F/H | 40 | Phasing out |
| Shenyang J-11 | China | Air superiority | J-11/B/BS/BG | 245 | Older airframes are being modernized |
| Shenyang J-16 | China | Strike fighter | J-16/D | 330-450 | |
| Shenyang J-35 | China | Stealth multirole | J-35A | 4-54+ | |
| Sukhoi Su-27 | Soviet Union | Air superiority | Su-27UBK | 32 | Older airframes slowly being phased out |
| Sukhoi Su-30 | Russia | Multirole | Su-30MKK/MK2 | 97 | |
| Sukhoi Su-35 | Russia | Air superiority | Su-35S | 24 | |
| Xian H-6 | China | Strategic bomber | H-6A | 12 | |
| Xian H-6 | China | Strategic bomber | H-6G/GMod | 27 | |
| Xian H-6 | China | Strategic bomber | H-6J | 18 | |
| Xian H-6 | China | Strategic bomber | H-6H/M | 40 | |
| Xian H-6 | China | Strategic bomber | H-6K | 110 | |
| Xian H-6 | China | Strategic bomber | H-6N | 12+ | |
| Xian JH-7 | China | Fighter bomber | JH-7A | 200 | Older airframes slowly being phased out |
AEW&C
| Boeing 737 | United States | Command and Control | | 2 | |
| KJ-2000 | China / Russia | AEW&C | | 4 | Chinese radar installed on an Ilyushin Il-76 airframe |
| Shaanxi KJ-200 | China | AEW&C | | 4 | |
| Shaanxi KJ-500 | China | AEW&C | | 40 | |
| Shaanxi Y-8 | China | Command and control | Y-8T | 6 | |
Reconnaissance
| JZ-8 | China | Reconnaissance | JZ-8/F | 48 | |
Electronic warfare
| Shaanxi Y-8 | China | Electronic warfare | Y-8CB/DZ/G/XZ | 17 | |
| Shaanxi Y-9 | China | Electronic warfare | Y-9G/XZ | 8+ | |
| Shaanxi Y-9 | China | ELINT | Y-9LG/X | 17+ | |
| Shenyang J-16 | China | Electronic-warfare aircraft | J-16D | 20 | Specialized for radar jamming |
| Tupolev Tu-154 | Soviet Union | SIGINT / ELINT | Tu-154M/D | 4 | |
Tanker
| Ilyushin Il-78 | Ukraine | Aerial refuelling | | 3 | |
| Xian H-6 | China | Aerial refuelling | H-6U/H-6DU | 15 | |
| Xian Y-20 | China | Aerial refuelling | YY-20A/B | 40 | |
Transport
| Airbus A319 | China | VIP Transport | | 3 | |
| Boeing 737 | United States | VIP Transport | | 10 | |
| Ilyushin Il-76 | Soviet Union | Strategic airlifter / Transport | Il-76MD/TD | 20 | |
| Shaanxi Y-8 | China | Transport | Y-8C | 30 | |
| Shaanxi Y-9 | China | Transport | | 30 | |
| Shijiazhuang Y-5 | China | Transport | | 70 | |
| Tupolev Tu-154 | Soviet Union | Transport | Tu-154M | 8 | |
| Xian Y-7 | China | Transport | Y-7/H | 41 | |
| Xian Y-20 | China | Strategic airlifter | | 55 | |
Helicopter
| Changhe Z-8 | China | Transport | | 18+ | |
| Eurocopter AS332 | France | VIP transport | | 6+ | |
| Eurocopter EC225 | France | VIP transport | | 3 | |
| Harbin Z-9 | China | Utility | | 20 | |
| Harbin Z-20 | China | SAR | Z-20S | 30+ | |
| Mil Mi-8 | Soviet Union | Utility / Transport | Mi-17/171 | 6 | |
Trainer aircraft: 1057+
| Chengdu J-7 | China | Conversion training | JJ-7/A | 200 | |
| Guizhou JL-9 | China | Jet trainer | | 45 | |
| Hongdu JL-8 | China | Jet trainer | | 350 | |
| Hongdu JL-10 | China | Jet trainer | | 50+ | |
| Nanchang CJ-6 | China | Basic trainer | CJ-6/A/B | 400 | |
| Xian HYJ-7 | China | Two-engine trainer | | 12+ | |
UAV
| AVIC WZ-8 | China | ELINT / ISR | | 2+ | |
| Chengdu GJ-1 | China | ISR | | 12+ | |
| Chengdu GJ-2 | China | ISR | | Unknown | |
| Chengdu WZ-10 | China | ELINT / ISR | | 8+ | |
| Guizhou WZ-7 | China | ELINT / ISR | | 24+ | |
| Hongdu GJ-11 | China | Aerial reconnaissance | | 2+ | |
| Shenyang WZ-9 | China | Airbone Early Warning | | Unknown | |
