= Shaanxi Y-15 =

Chinese medium military transport aircraft

The Shaanxi Y-15 (Chinese: 运-15; pinyin: Yùn-15) is a Chinese medium four-engine turboprop utility/military transport aircraft produced by Shaanxi Aircraft Company for the People's Liberation Army. The aircraft was previously known as the Shaanxi Y-30 concept when the project was announced at the Zhuhai Airshow 2014. It is an indigenously designed replacement for the Shaanxi Y-9, which itself was an upgrade of the aging Shaanxi Y-8.

== Development ==
The Y-15 began as the Y-30 concept, which the Shaanxi Aircraft Company announced at the Zhuhai Airshow 2014. Shaanxi officials said the Y-30 project was a comprehensive upgrade over the Y-9, particularly to address the Y-9's narrow fuselage and cargo bay. The Y-30 prototype was projected to have a gross weight of approximately 80 t (180,000 lb) and an estimated cargo capacity of 30–40 t (66,000–88,000 lb). Two engine options were offered: a four-turboprop design or a twin-turbofan design. Bradley Perrett of the Aviation Week noted the appearance of the flying prototype was delayed as Chinese industry focused resources on other aviation projects.

The Y-30 prototype made its maiden flight on 16 December 2025. The flying prototype featured six-blade propellers, an aerial refueling probe, T-tails, and a blended winglet design. Analyst noted the Y-30 is slightly smaller in weight class to the Airbus A400M, and sitting between the Shaanxi Y-9, Lockheed Martin C-130J Super Hercules and Xi'an Y-20.

Between June and August 2026, new prototypes of the Y-30 underwent flight testing. Analysts began to call them the new designation Y-15, as aircraft were painted with serial numbers starting with '15'.

== See also ==
- Military transport aircraft
- Shaanxi Y-9

Aircraft of comparable role, configuration, and era

- Airbus A400M
- Embraer C-390 Millennium
- Kawasaki C-2

Related lists

- List of military transport aircraft
