= People's Liberation Army Navy Air Force =

Aerial warfare branch of China's navy

- 中国人民解放军海军航空兵
- People's Liberation Army Navy Jack and Ensign Flag of the People's Liberation Army Navy
- Active: 1952–present
- Country: China
- Allegiance: Chinese Communist Party
- Branch: People's Liberation Army Navy
- Type: Naval aviation
- Size: 18,000 personnel 263 aircraft
- Part of: People's Liberation Army
- Engagements: 1994 Yellow Sea incident; Hainan Island incident; Chinese anti-piracy operations in the Gulf of Aden

Aircraft flown
- Electronic warfare: KJ-200, KJ-500, KJ-600, Y-8, Y-9, Z-18
- Fighter: J-11, J-15, J-35
- Helicopter: Ka-27, Ka-28, Ka-31, Mi-8, Z-8, Z-9, Z-18, Z-20
- Patrol: Y-9
- Reconnaissance: BZK-005, BZK-007, WZ-7 Soaring Dragon
- Trainer: CJ-6, JL-8, JL-9, JL-10, Y-7
- Transport: CRJ200, CRJ700, Y-5, Y-7, Y-8

The People's Liberation Army Navy Air Force (PLANAF; Chinese: 中国人民解放军海军航空兵; pinyin: Zhōngguó Rénmín Jiěfàngjūn Hǎijūn Hángkōngbīng) is the naval aviation branch of the People's Liberation Army Navy.

== History ==
Historically, the PLANAF's main role has been to provide the navy's warships with air defense coverage. Part of the coastal defense doctrine was to have naval aircraft protecting the ships, hence the reason why many PLA ships of the 1960s–70s lacked long range anti-aircraft missiles or artillery. During the Sino-Vietnamese War, the PLANAF carried out many successful bombing and airstrike missions against Vietnamese territories, such as in the Spratly Islands. The 1960s saw a series of air combat sorties flown against the Republic of China Air Force. PLANAF pilots have been credited with many major victories over the Taiwanese in these small incidents. Historical aircraft operated by the PLANAF include the J-5, the J-6, and H-5. These aircraft have been retired by the late 1990s.

A PLANAF J-15 made the first landing on Liaoning, China's first aircraft carrier, on 25 November 2012.

According to the Department of the Air Force's China Aerospace Studies Institute (CASI) the PLANAF had around 2016 a major restructuring into a brigade structure.

The PLANAF has often deployed shipborne helicopters to combat piracy in the Gulf of Aden.

In 2023, the PLANAF transferred maritime strike, bomber, and most fighter units to the People's Liberation Army Air Force, including at least 3 fighter brigades, 2 bomber regiments, 3 radar brigades, 3 air defense brigades, and some airbases. It retained its carrier aircraft, a fighter brigade with J-11B/BS, helicopters, UAVs, and other special purpose aircraft.

== Organization ==
- Northern Theatre Command Naval Air Force, North Sea Fleet
- Eastern Theater Command Naval Air Force, East Sea Fleet
- Southern Theatre Command Naval Air Force, South Sea Fleet
- PLA Naval Aviation University

== Bases ==
- Lingshui Naval Air Station - KJ-500, Shaanxi Y-8Q and ground base of Shenyang J-15s

== Equipment ==
Aircraft	Origin	Type	Variant	In service	Notes
Combat aircraft
Shenyang J-11	China	Air superiority	J-11B/BS	50	
Shenyang J-15	China	Multirole	J-15	60	
Shenyang J-15	China	Multirole	J-15T	50+	
Shenyang J-35	China	Multirole stealth aircraft		4+	
AEW&C
Shaanxi Y-8	China	AEW	KJ-200	6	
Shaanxi Y-8	China	AEW	Y-8J	4	
Shaanxi KJ-500	China	AEW		20+	
Xi'an KJ-600	China	AEW		3+	
Electronic warfare
Shenyang J-15	China	EW	J-15D	6	
Shaanxi Y-8	China	ELINT	Y-8JB	4	
Shaanxi Y-8	China	ELINT	Y-8X	3	
Shaanxi Y-9	China	ELINT	Y-9JZ	10	
Anti-submarine
Shaanxi Y-9	China	Anti-submarine warfare	KQ-200	30+	
Transport
Bombardier CRJ200	Canada	VIP transport	CRJ-200	2	
Bombardier CRJ700	Canada	VIP transport	CRJ-700	2	
Shaanxi Y-8	China	Tactical transport	Y-8C	6	
Shijiazhuang Y-5	China	Transport		20	
Xian Y-7	China	Tactical transport	Y-7G	2	
Xian Y-7	China	Tactical transport	Y-7H	6	
Helicopter
Aérospatiale SA 321	France	Transport		8	
Changhe Z-8	China	Transport	Z-8/C/J	50	
Changhe Z-8	China	SAR	Z-8JH	4	
Changhe Z-8	China	MEDVAC	Z-8S	2	
Changhe Z-18	China	Transport	Z-18	4	
Changhe Z-18	China	ASW	Z-18F	10	
Changhe Z-18	China	AEW	Z-18J	4+	
Harbin Z-9	China	ASW	Z-9C	14	
Harbin Z-9	China	Multirole	Z-9D	11	
Harbin Z-9	China	SAR	Z-9S	2	
Harbin Z-20	China	ASW	Z-20F	2+	
Harbin Z-20	China	Utility	Z-20J	2+	
Kamov Ka-27	Soviet Union	SAR	Ka-27PS	3	
Kamov Ka-28	Soviet Union	ASW		14	
Kamov Ka-31	Russia	AEW		9	
Mil Mi-8	Soviet Union	Transport		8	
Trainer aircraft
Hongdu JL-8	China	Jet trainer		16	
Guizhou JL-9	China	Jet trainer		28	
Guizhou JL-9	China	Carrier trainer	JL-9G	12	
Hongdu JL-10	China	Jet trainer		12	
Nanchang CJ-6	China	Basic trainer		38	
Xian Y-7	China	Navigator and bombardier trainer	HY-7	12	
Unmanned aerial vehicle
Aisheng ASN-209	China	ISR		Unknown	
Harbin BZK-005	China	MALE UAV		Unknown	
Harbin BZK-007	China	MALE UAV		Unknown	
Guizhou WZ-7 Soaring Dragon	China	HALE UAV		Unknown	

== Future ==
In July 2018, Lieutenant General Zhang Honghe of the PLAAF stated that China is developing a new carrier-based aircraft that will replace the J-15 due to four crashes and numerous technical problems. One problem with the aircraft is that it is the heaviest carrier-borne fighter in current operation with an empty weight of 17,500 kg compared to the F/A-18E/F Super Hornet's 14,600 kg (though it is less than the F-14 Tomcat's weight of 19,800 kg). Weight problems are compounded when operating off Liaoning, as its STOBAR launch and recovery method further limits payload capacity.

== See also ==
- List of active People's Liberation Army aircraft
- Republic of China Naval Aviation Command
