= Shaanxi KQ-200 =

Anti-submarine and maritime surveillance aircraft

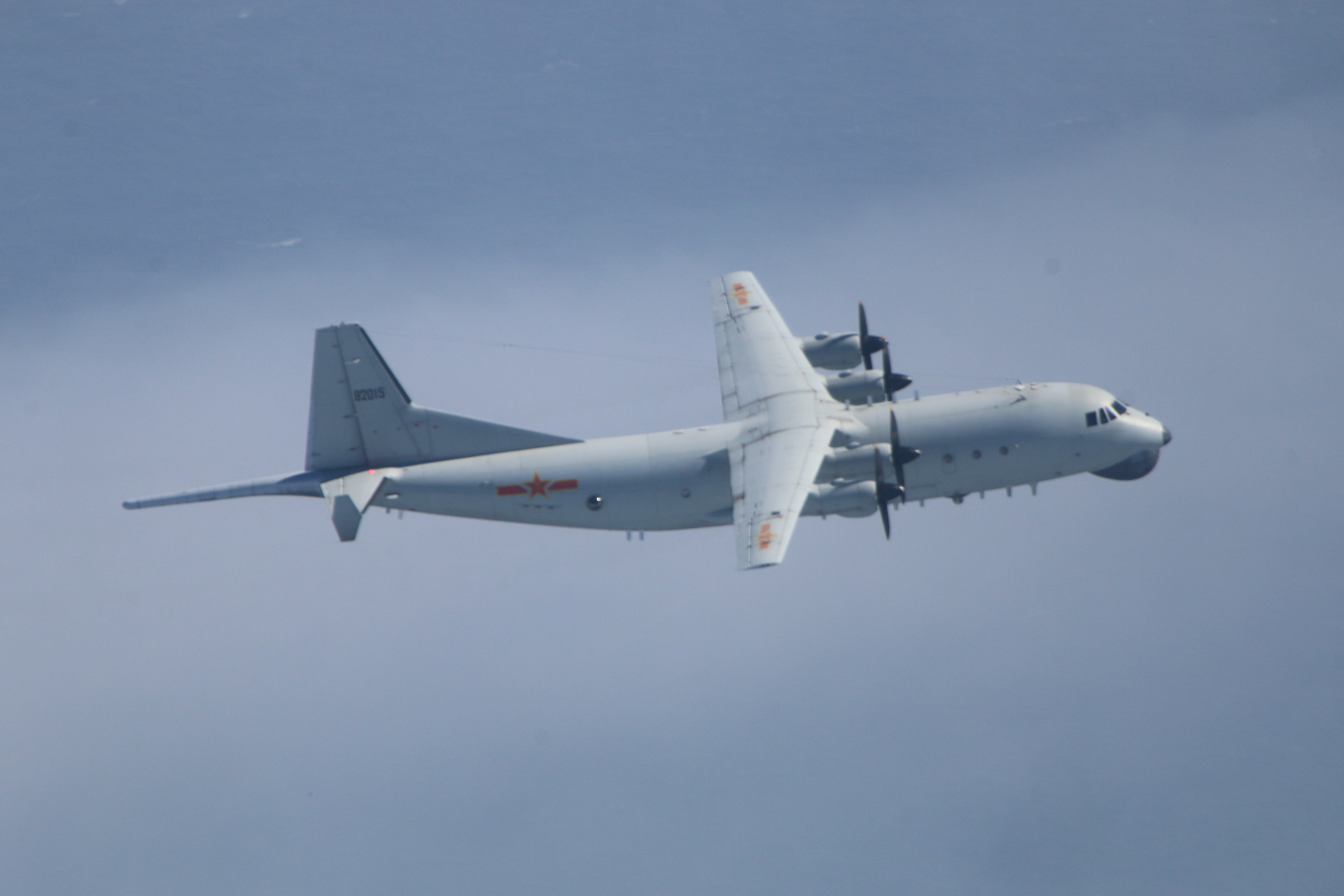
- KQ-200 anti-submarine and patrol aircraft

General information
- Type: Maritime patrol aircraft (MPA)
- National origin: China
- Manufacturer: Shaanxi Aircraft Corporation
- Status: In service
- Primary user: People's Liberation Army Naval Air Force
- Number built: 30+

History
- Manufactured: 2015-present
- Introduction date: 2015
- Developed from: Shaanxi Y-8; Shaanxi Y-9

The Shaanxi KQ-200 (Chinese: 空潜-200; pinyin: kōngqián-200; trans. "air-submarine 200"), also known as the Shaanxi GX-6 (Chinese: 高 新-6; pinyin: gāoxīn-6; trans. "high-tech 6"). is a Chinese anti-submarine (ASW) and maritime patrol aircraft (MPA) manufactured by Shaanxi Aircraft Corporation. It is based on the Shaanxi Y-8 or Shaanxi Y-9 and is called the Y-8Q and Y-9Q respectively.

The aircraft was in service with the People's Liberation Army Naval Air Force (PLANAF) by 2017.

== Design ==
The KQ-200 has a chin-mounted surface search radar, a magnetic anomaly detector in a tail boom, and an electro-optical camera in a belly turret. Lightweight torpedoes are carried in internal bays. Sonobuoys are deployed from four internal rotary cabinets.

== History ==
Two prototypes were built by late-2011. A new production line for the aircraft may have opened in late-2016.

The PLANAF received its first KQ-200 in 2015. By 2017, they were deployed by the Southern Theater Command and all three theater commands by 2023.

One may have crashed in the Gulf of Tonkin in March 2022.

== Operators ==
People's Republic of China

- People's Liberation Army Naval Air Force - 30+

== Specifications ==
General characteristics

- Crew: 11 + 2 (pilot and co-pilot)
- Powerplant: 4 × Wojiang WJ-6C turboprop engines
- Propellers: 6-bladed propellers

Performance

- Maximum speed: 600 km/h (370 mph, 320 kn)
- Ferry range: 5,000 km (3,100 mi, 2,700 nmi)
- Endurance: 8+ hours

Armament

- Depth charges
- Sonobuoys
  - 100 x SQ-4/SQ-5
- Torpedoes
  - 10 x Yu-7 torpedo

Avionics

- Electro-optical sensor
- Magnetic anomaly detector
- Surface search radar

== See also ==
Aircraft of comparable role, configuration, and era

- ATR 72MP
- Boeing P-8 Poseidon
- CASA C-295 MPA
- Kawasaki P-1

== Sources ==
- Dahm, J. Michael (2020). Special Mission Aircraft and Unmanned Systems (PDF) (Report). South China Sea Military Capabilities Series. Johns Hopkins University Applied Physics Laboratory.
- Tirk, Eli; Salisbury, Daniel (7 May 2024). PLAN Anti-Submarine Warfare Aircraft - Sensors, Weapons, and Operational Concepts (Report). China Maritime Report. US Naval War College China Maritime Studies Institute.
