= Shaanxi Y-9JZ =

Chinese naval electronic intelligence aircraft

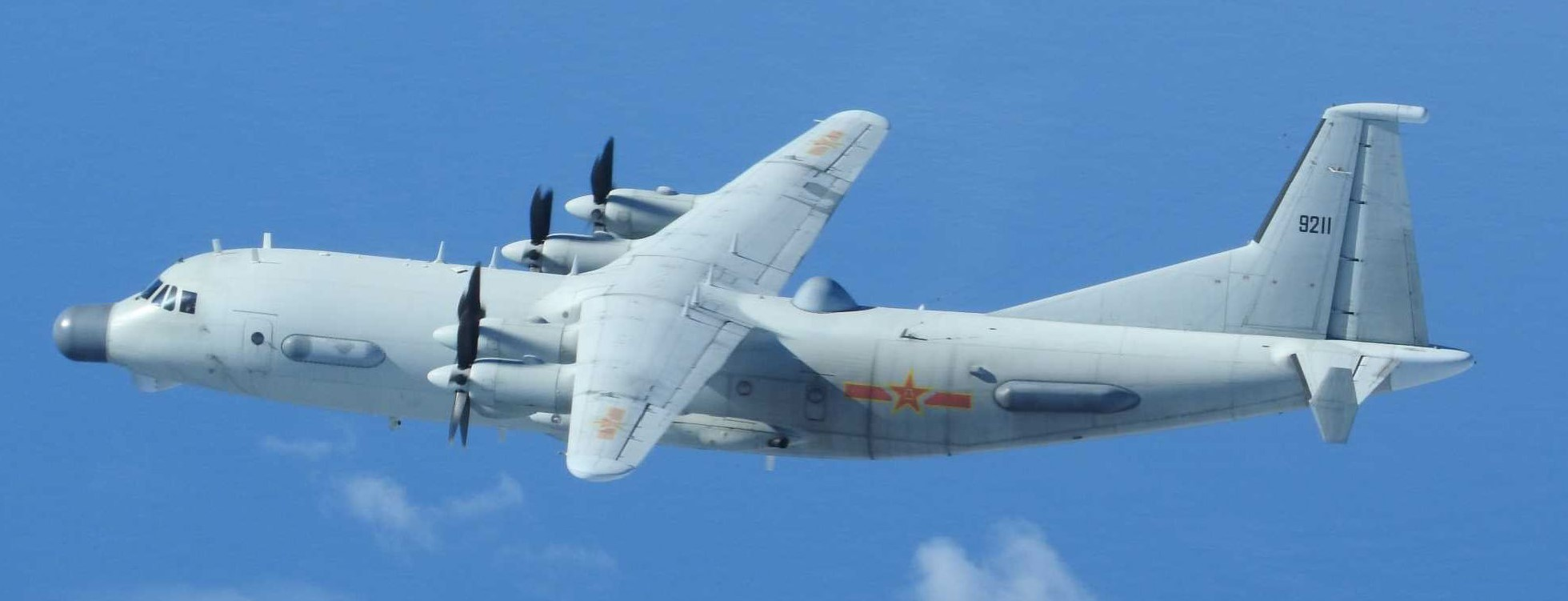
- Y-9JZ ELINT aircraft

General information
- Type: Surveillance aircraft
- National origin: China
- Manufacturer: Shaanxi Aircraft Corporation
- Status: In service
- Primary user: People's Liberation Army Naval Air Force
- Number built: 8

History
- Introduction date: 2012
- Developed from: Shaanxi Y-9

The Shaanxi Y-9JZ is an electronic intelligence (ELINT) surveillance aircraft built by Shaanxi Aircraft Corporation for the Chinese People's Liberation Army Navy. It is based on the Shaanxi Y-9 airframe and driven by WJ-6C turboprop engines with 6-blade propellers. Identifying characteristics of the aircraft are a prominent nose radome and four large rectangular-shaped fairings on both sides of the forward and rear fuselage. An electro-optical turret (containing FLIR/TV) is also mounted underneath the fuselage for surveillance purposes.

The aircraft entered service in early 2012 and routinely operates ELINT missions over the East China Sea around disputed waters with Japan and Taiwan.

== Operators ==
People's Republic of China

- People's Liberation Army Naval Air Force - 8
