= Electronic-warfare aircraft =

Military aircraft designed to conduct electronic warfare

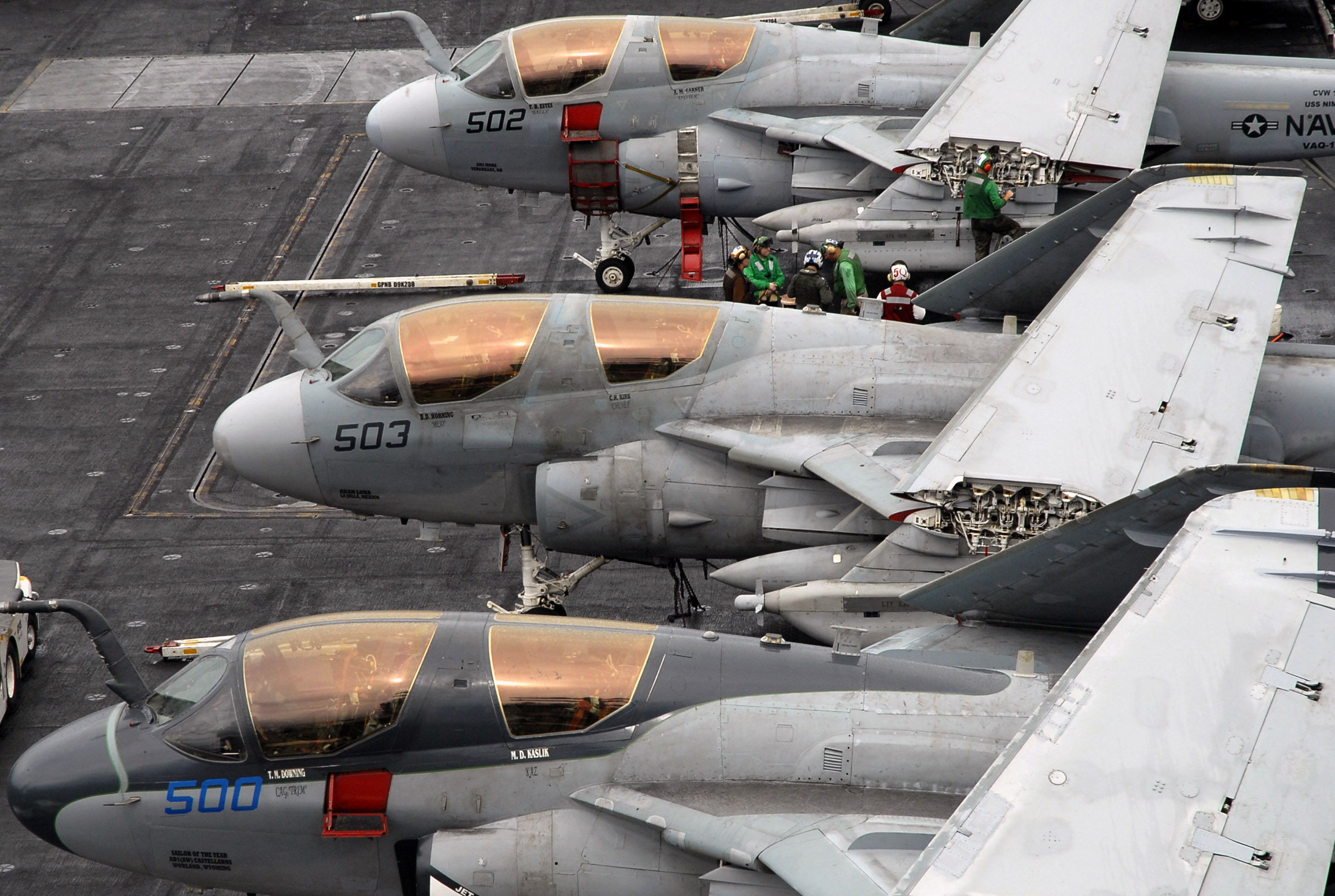
U.S. Navy Grumman EA-6B Prowler electronic-warfare aircraft aboard the USS Nimitz (CVN-68) in 2007. Compared to the Grumman A-6 Intruder it is derived from, the EA-6B has an extra rear seating compartment for personnel operating electronic countermeasures.

An electronic-warfare aircraft is a military aircraft equipped for electronic warfare (EW)—that is, degrading the effectiveness of enemy radar and communications systems by using radar jamming and deception methods, via electronic countermeasures and electronic counter-countermeasures.

In 1943, British Avro Lancaster aircraft were equipped with chaff in order to blind enemy air defence radars. They were supplemented by specially-equipped aircraft flown by No. 100 Group RAF, which operated modified Halifaxes, Liberators and Fortresses carrying various jammers such as Carpet, Airborne Cigar, Mandrel, Jostle, and Piperack.

== List of electronic-warfare aircraft ==
China

- Shaanxi Y-8EW
- Shaanxi Y-8-GX1
- Shaanxi Y-9-GX11
- Shaanxi Y-9LG
- Shaanxi Y-9DZ
- Shenyang J-15D
- Shenyang J-16D

Germany / Italy

- Tornado ECR

Japan

- Kawasaki EC-2

Pakistan

- Dassault Falcon 20

South Africa

- Denel TP1 Oryx EW
- Douglas C-47TP EW

USSR

- Antonov An-26REP
- Mil Mi-8PP
- Sukhoi Su-24MP
- Tupolev Tu-16RM-2
- Yakovlev Yak-28PP

Soviet Union / Russia

- Ilyushin Il-22PP

Turkey

- Hava SOJ

United States

- Boeing EA-18G Growler
- Douglas EA-3 Skywarrior
- Douglas EB-66 Destroyer
- Douglas EF-10B Skyknight
- General Dynamics/Grumman EF-111A Raven
- Grumman EA-6B Prowler
- L3Harris EA-37B Compass Call
- Lockheed EC-130H Compass Call

== See also ==
- Airborne early warning and control
- Airborne ground surveillance
- Airborne Launch Control Center
