= Shaanxi KJ-500 =

Airborne early warning and control aircraft

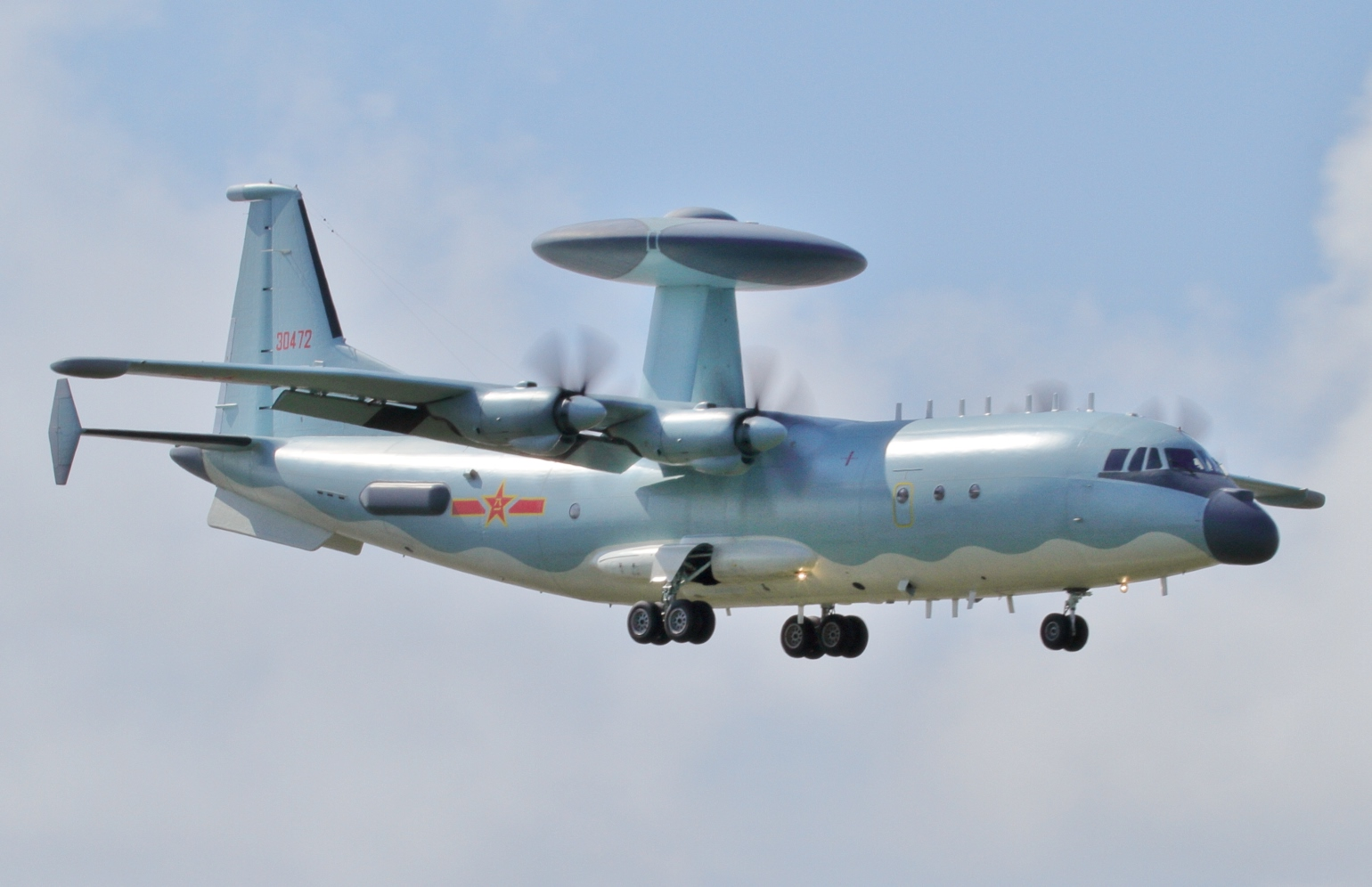
- KJ-500

General information
- Type: Airborne early warning and control (AEW&C)
- National origin: China
- Manufacturer: Shaanxi Aircraft Corporation
- Status: In service, in production
- Primary users: People's Liberation Army Air Force People's Liberation Army Navy Air Force
- Number built: 60+

History
- Manufactured: 2018-present
- Developed from: Shaanxi Y-9

The Shaanxi KJ-500 (Chinese: 空警-500; pinyin: Kōngjǐng Wǔbǎi; literally: "Air Warning 500"), also known as Qianliyan-500 (Chinese: 千里眼-500; pinyin: qiān lǐ yǎn-500; lit. 'All-seeing-500') is a third-generation airborne early warning and control (AEW&C) aircraft used by the Chinese People's Liberation Army Air Force (PLAAF). It was built by Shaanxi Aircraft Corporation, and is based on the Y-9 airframe.

== Development ==
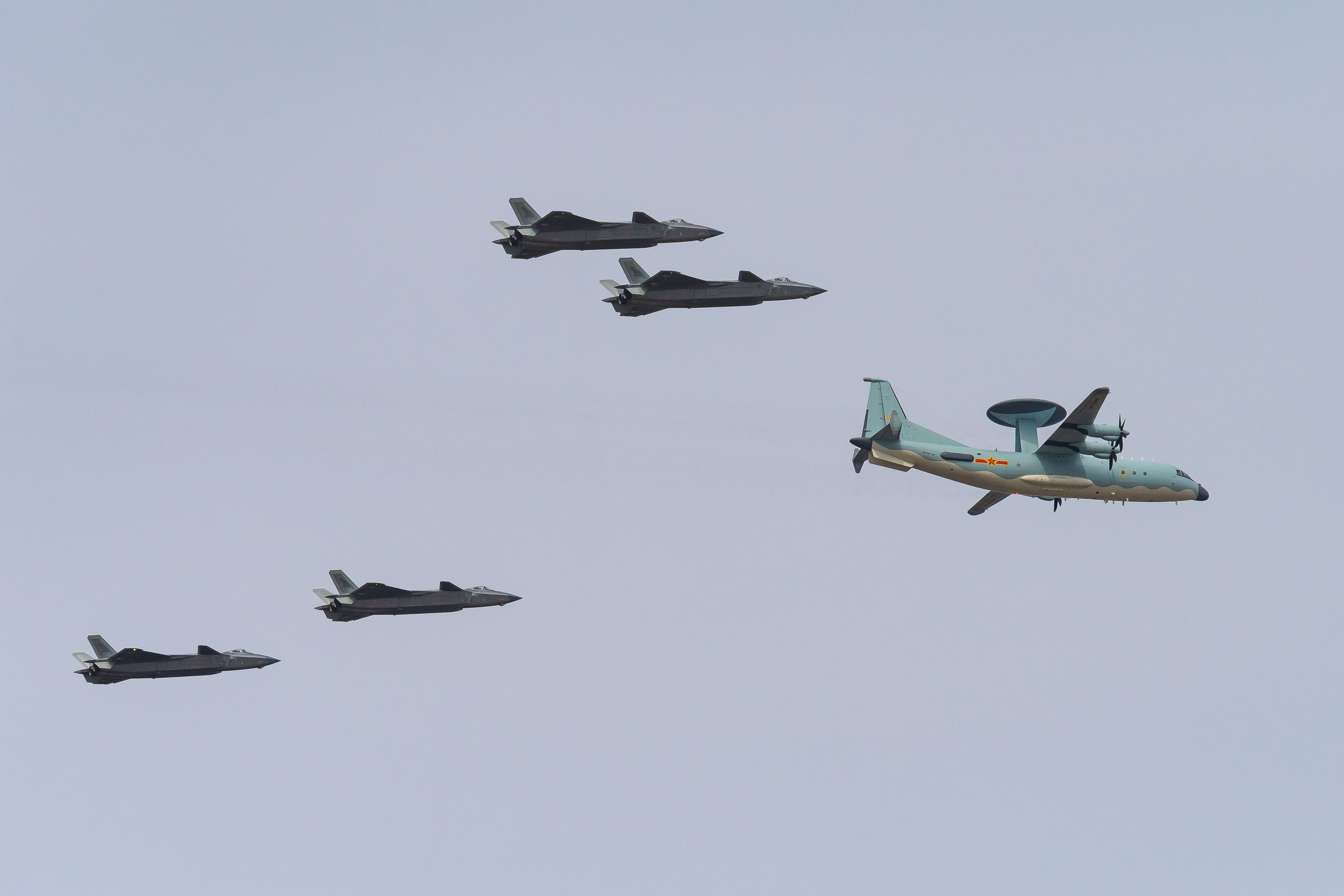
KJ-500 leading J-20s in 2022 Changchun Airshow

Since the beginning of the 21st century, the detection range and the accuracy of airborne radars have been increasing, and fighters equipped with various types of air-to-air missiles and low-altitude cruise missiles continue to improve in performance, creating a demand for a more capable AEW&C. To address the above issues, China began developing the KJ-500, China's third AEW&C model, in the late 2000s. The KJ-500 was required to have three important features, including good detection capability, good identification, and quick responsiveness. The KJ-500 was also required to be the core force of the information combat system; its equipment was required to have characteristics of networking, multi-functionality, high-integration, and lightweight.

The aircraft carries a fixed dorsal radome containing three AESA radar arrays for 360-degree coverage and is said to be more efficient than the two-planar 'balance beam' array design used on the earlier KJ-200. Production of older AEW&C types reportedly ceased in 2018 in response to the KJ-500 reaching full operational capability.

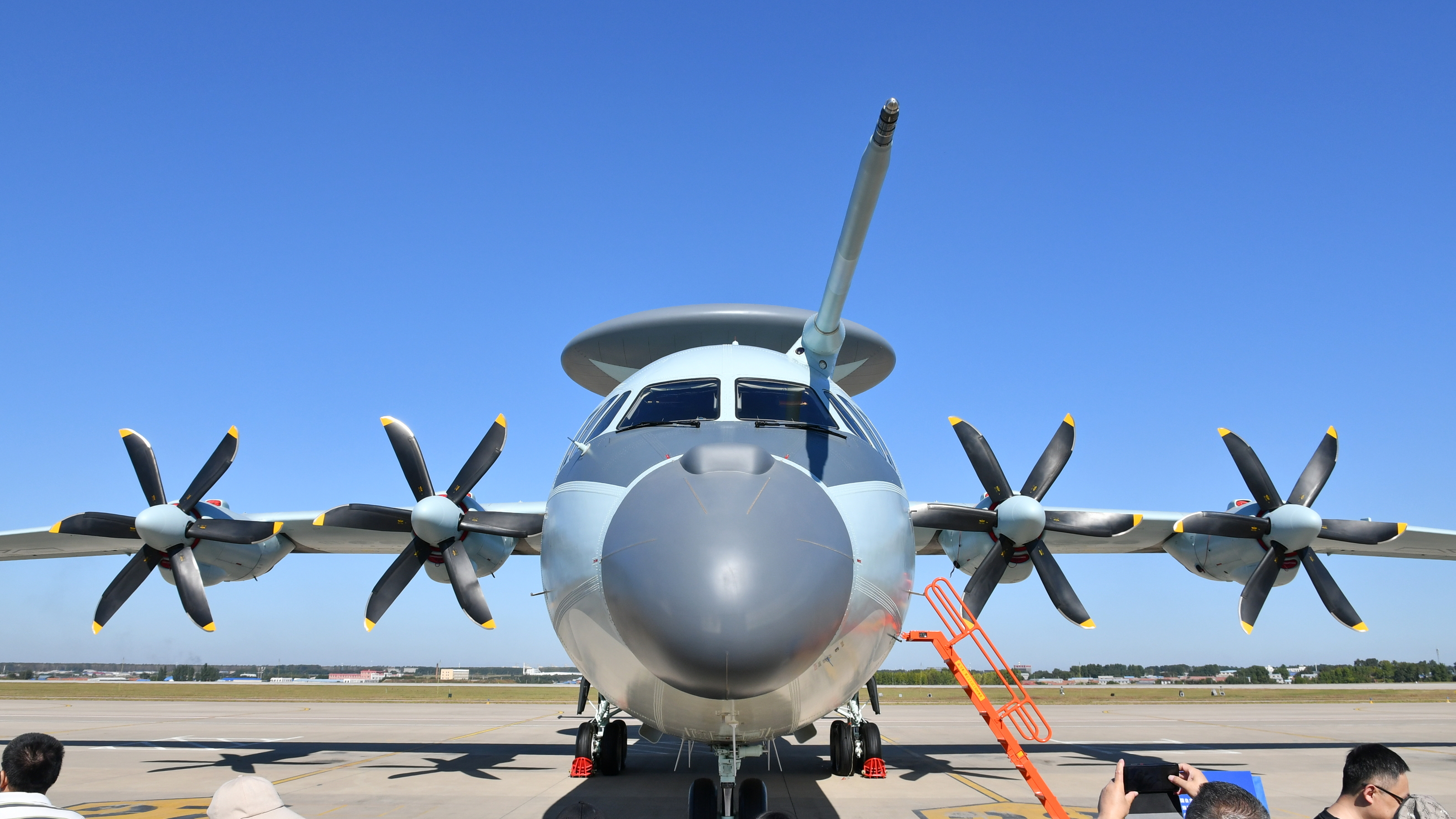
KJ-500A's radome and aerial refueling probe

In April 2018, China began testing KJ-500A, an improved variant with aerial refueling capability, better computer processing, improved cooling systems, new antennas to support the kill-webs, and enhanced satellite systems. By August 2018, at least two units were built. The KJ-500A reportedly entered service in late 2020. As of 2023, the KJ-500A had become the production standard with 7-8 airframes built. In 2026, it's estimated that half of the KJ-500 are KJ-500A variant in the Chinese military service.

== Operational history ==
In March 2022, General Kenneth Wilsbach, commander of U.S. Pacific Air Forces, identified the KJ-500 as an enabler for long-range Chinese air-to-air missiles.

== Export and potential sales ==
On 6 June 2025, Pakistan's government officially announced the country's plan to acquire the KJ-500.

== Variants ==
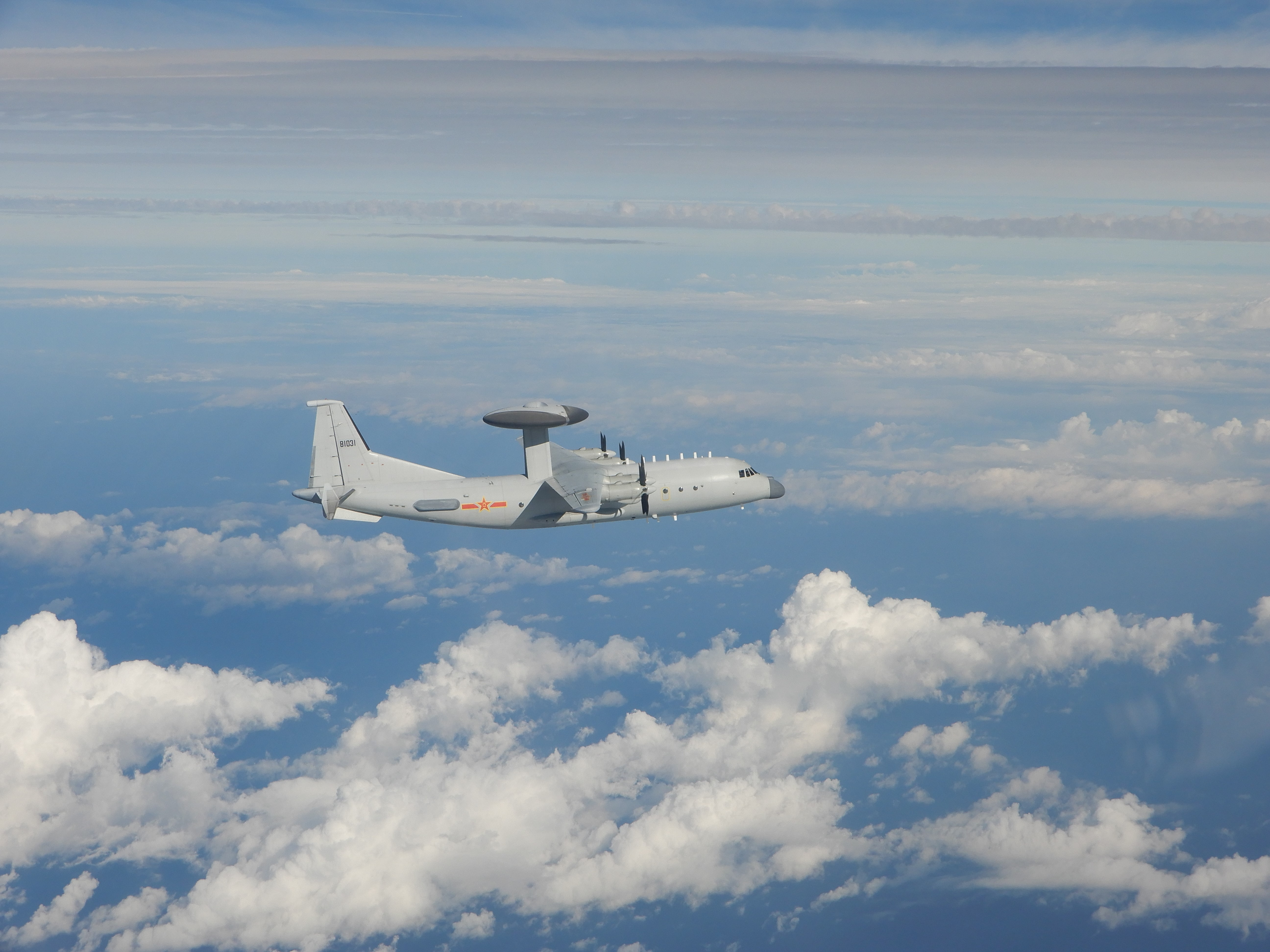
PLA Navy KJ-500H

KJ-500
Base variant
KJ-500H
Variant for PLA Navy.
KJ-500A
Improved variant with an aerial refueling probe. Debut in Zhuhai Airshow 2022.

== Operators ==
People's Republic of China

- People's Liberation Army Air Force - 40 KJ-500
- People's Liberation Army Naval Air Force - 20+ KJ-500H

=== Future Operators ===
Pakistan

- Pakistan Air Force - 4 on order

Algeria

- Algeria is finalizing a deal to acquire several units

== Specifications ==
Limited performance parameters of KJ-500 have been published as follows:

- Max speed (km/h): 550
- Max range (km): 5700
- Max endurance (h): 12
- Max takeoff weight(tons): 77
- Range against fighter sized targets (km): 470

== See also ==
- KJ-600
- KJ-3000

Related development

- Shaanxi Y-9

Aircraft of comparable role, configuration, and era

- Boeing E-3 Sentry
- Boeing E-7 Wedgetail
- EL/W-2090
- GlobalEye

Related lists

- List of AEW&C aircraft
- List of aircraft produced by the People's Republic of China
