= Shaanxi KJ-200 =

Airborne early warning and control aircraft

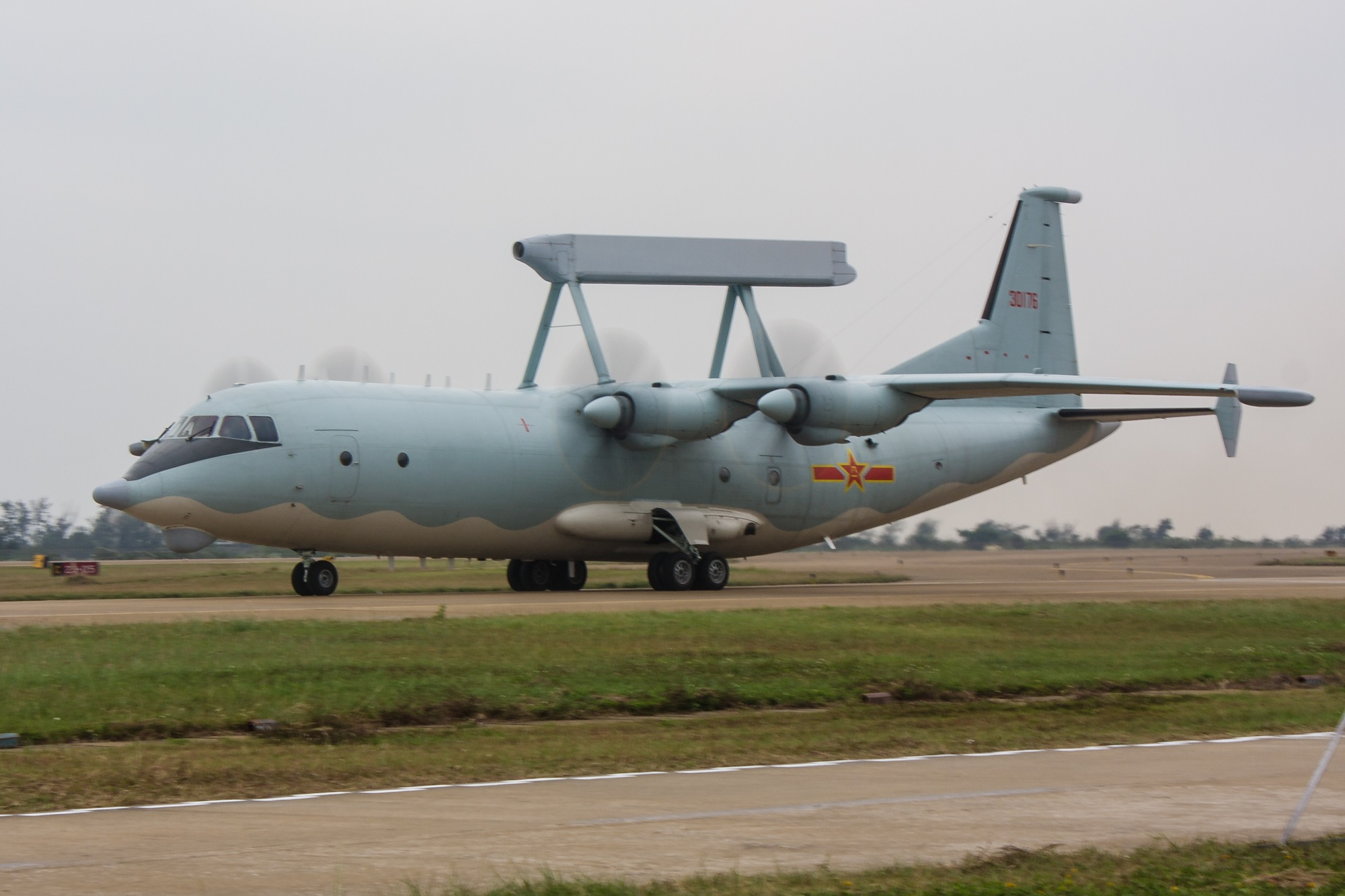
- A Shaanxi KJ-200

General information
- Type: Airborne early warning and control
- National origin: China
- Manufacturer: Shaanxi Aircraft Corporation
- Status: In service
- Primary user: People's Liberation Army Air Force; People's Liberation Army Navy
- Number built: 11

History
- Introduction date: 2007
- First flight: 2005
- Developed from: Shaanxi Y-8

The Shaanxi KJ-200 (NATO reporting name: Moth), also known as the Shaanxi GX-5, is an airborne early warning and control (AEW&C) aircraft developed by the Shaanxi Aircraft Corporation of China. It is based on the Shaanxi Y-8 military transport aircraft.

== Design and development ==
Development began in 2002 after the United States blocked the sale of the Israeli EL/W-2090 Phalcon radar to China. According to Science and Technology Daily, Ouyang Shaoxiu, Shaanxi's chief designer, was the program's chief designer, 80% of the Y-8 was modified to create the KJ-200.

The primary sensor is a JY-06 active electronically scanned array (AESA) radar mounted in a "plank" or 'balance beam" housing above the fuselage; the configuration resembles various uses of the Ericsson Erieye radar system.

The aircraft's first flight was in January 2005. The second aircraft crashed in 2006 due to wing icing; the crash "almost derailed" the program.

== Operational history ==
The KJ-200 aircraft entered service with the People's Liberation Army in 2007. Its first official public appearance was at the 2009 Chinese National Day Parade.

In February 2017, a US Navy Lockheed P-3 Orion and a KJ-200 inadvertently passed within 1,000 feet (300 meters) of each other over the South China Sea.

== Variants ==
KJ-200
Base variant.
KJ-200A
Modified KJ-200 with revised nose section and new electronics. First observed in December 2016.
"KJ-200AG"
Unofficial designation for KJ-200A with inflight air refueling probe.
KJ-200H
Modified KJ-200 for PLA Navy.
KJ-200B
Adds satellite communications and new electronics. First observed in 2016. Entered service in 2023.

== Operators ==
China

- People's Liberation Army Air Force - 4
- People's Liberation Army Naval Air Force - 6

== See also ==
- KJ-500
- KJ-2000

Related development

- Shaanxi Y-8

Aircraft of comparable role, configuration, and era

- Embraer R-99
- Erieye
- GlobalEye
- Boeing E-7 Wedgetail

== Sources ==
- Dahm, J. Michael (2020). Special Mission Aircraft and Unmanned Systems (PDF) (Report). South China Sea Military Capabilities Series. Johns Hopkins University Applied Physics Laboratory.
- Erickson, Andrew S. (February 2014). "Chinese Air- and Space-Based ISR". In Dutton, Peter; Erickson, Andrew S.; Martinson, Ryan (eds.). China's Near Seas Combat Capabilities (Report). China Maritime Studies. Vol. 11. United States Naval War College.
- The International Institute for Strategic Studies (2025). The Military Balance 2025. London: Routledge. ISBN 978-1-041-04967-8.
- Wood, Peter; Cliff, Roger (November 2020). Chinese Airborne C4ISR. China Aerospace Studies Institute. ISBN 9798583085569.
