= Xi'an KJ-600 =

Chinese carrier-based cargo and AEW&C plane

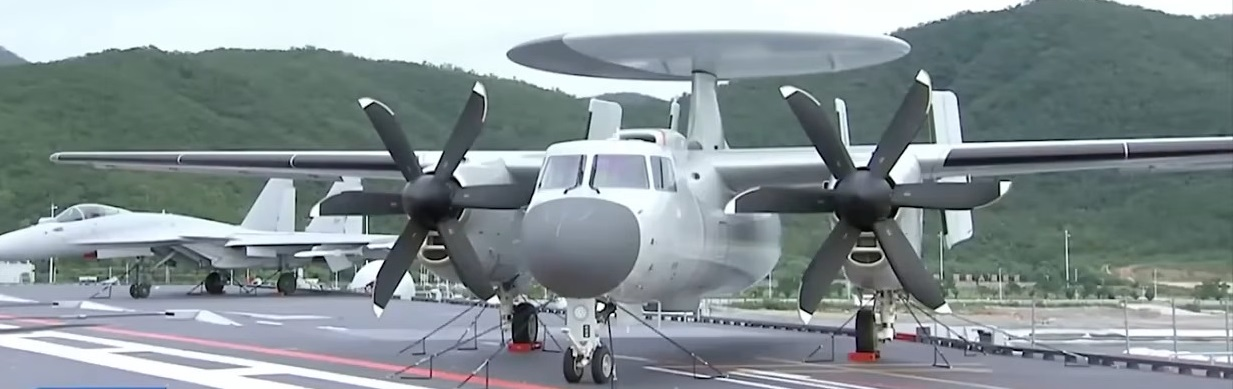
- KJ-600 during trials aboard Fujian

General information
- Type: Carrier-capable transport / carrier onboard delivery / airborne early warning and control
- National origin: China
- Manufacturer: Xi'an Aircraft Industrial Corporation
- Designer: Xi'an Aircraft Design Research Institute
- Status: In service
- Primary user: People's Liberation Army Naval Air Force
- Number built: 4-6+

History
- Introduction date: 3 September 2025
- First flight: 29 August 2020
- Developed from: Xian JZY-01

The Xi'an KJ-600 is a Chinese twin-propeller, quad-tail, folding high-wing military aircraft designed for carrier-based airborne early warning and control (AEW&C) and cargo delivery; the aircraft has been used for catapult-launched (CATOBAR) operations on Type 003 and later-class aircraft carriers of the People's Liberation Army Navy since 2025.

== Development ==
The aircraft made its maiden flight on 29 August 2020. Flight testing continued in 2021. A prototype in flight was spotted by aircraft observers above the testing facility in October 2021. In late 2023 "intensive trials" were underway with at least four, possibly even six, prototypes, according to Gu Min Chul.

On 3 September 2025, one KJ-600 attended the 80th Anniversary of Victory over Japan military parade as part of the flypast over Tiananmen Square, appearing to the public for the first time. Chinese state media China Daily announced that KJ-600 is deployed with the People's Liberation Army Navy.

As of 2025, a cargo variant of the KJ-600 for carrier onboard delivery (COD) was likely under development.

== Design ==
The KJ-600 is a high-straight wing aircraft reportedly powered by a pair of WJ-6 turboprop engine, and sports a quad-fin tailplane, tricycle gear and a large rotating dorsal radome hosting two active electronically scanned array (AESA) radars. A non-flying model was observed on a concrete mockup carrier at the Wuhan electronic testing facility in 2019. The mockup has a striking external resemblance to the aftward-folding Northrop Grumman E-2 Hawkeye.

The KJ-600 serves the airborne early warning and control (AEW&C) roles on the Fujian carrier, extending the detection, surveillance, and command and control range of the carrier strike group.

== Operational history ==
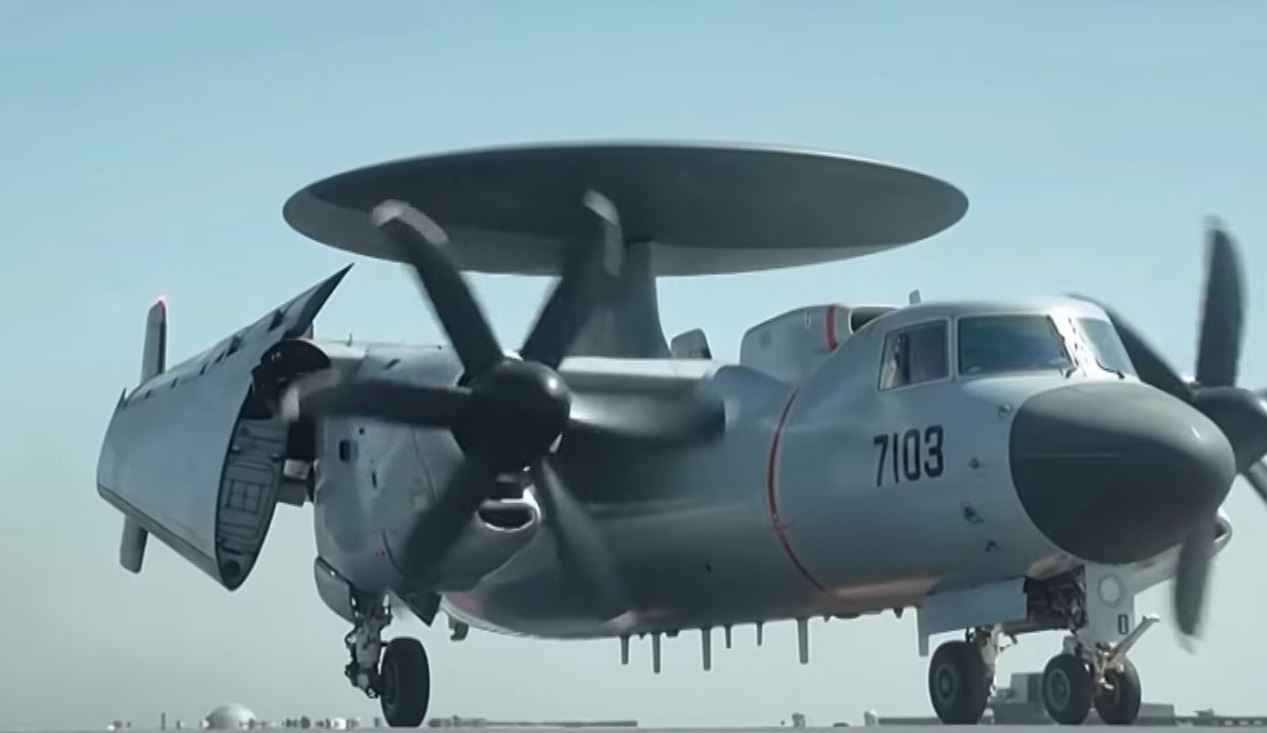
KJ-600 aboard Fujian's flight deck

On 22 September 2025, the Chinese state broadcaster released multiple videos and photos showing the complete catapult launch and recovery (CATOBAR) sequence for the Xi'an KJ-600, Shenyang J-15T, and Shenyang J-35 aircraft on the Type 003 Fujian aircraft carrier, via the ship's electromagnetic catapults. With three aircraft certified for CATOBAR operations, the PLA Navy also announced that Fujian had achieved "initial full-deck operational capability", which laid the foundation for the future integration with the carrier aviation wing and the carrier strike group. The certification test were likely conducted before September 2025.

By 2026, at least six KJ-600 prototypes had been built and were in use on aircraft carriers, with serial production likely underway.

== Operators ==
People's Republic of China

- People's Liberation Army Naval Air Force - 6+ KJ-600 as of 2026

== Strategic implication ==
USNI analyst H. I. Sutton believed in 2020 that the KJ-600 would be a massive boost to the PLA Navy, and "[o]nce it enters service on the carriers, it will greatly enhance the aerial and maritime situational awareness [...] [a]nd the offensive and defensive capabilities of the carrier group", and that "Chinese aerospace and military industry has certainly shown its ability to develop quite modern and capable AEW&C systems for other air, naval and ground applications".

== Specifications (KJ-600) ==
General characteristics

- Crew: 5-6
- Length: 18.14 m (59 ft 6 in)
- Wingspan: 25 m (82 ft)
- Height: 5.72 m (18 ft 9 in)
- Empty weight: 25,401 kg (56,000 lb)
- Gross weight: 30,481 kg (67,200 lb)
- Fuel capacity: 6000kg
- Powerplant: 2 × Zhuzhou WoJiang-6C turboprop engines, 3,805 kW (5,103 hp) each (FWJ-6C)
- Propellers: 6-bladed constant-speed feathering and reversible propellers

Performance

- Maximum speed: 693 km/h (431 mph, 374 kn)
- Range: 1,250 km (780 mi, 670 nmi)
- Ferry range: 2,800 km (1,700 mi, 1,500 nmi)
- Service ceiling: 15,000 m (50,000 ft)

== See also ==
Related development

- Xian JZY-01
- Xian Y-7

Aircraft of comparable role, configuration, and era

- Bell Boeing CMV-22 Osprey
- Grumman C-2 Greyhound
- Northrop Grumman E-2 Hawkeye
- Yakovlev Yak-44
