= Transport aircraft =

Transport aircraft is a broad category of aircraft that includes:

- Airliners, aircraft, usually large and most often operated by airlines, intended for carrying multiple passengers or cargo in commercial service
- Cargo aircraft or freighters, fixed-wing aircraft designed or converted for the carriage of goods, rather than passengers, lacking in passenger amenities and generally featuring one or more large doors for loading cargo; also known as freight aircraft, freighters, airlifters, or cargo jets.
- Mail planes, airplanes used for carrying mail
- Military transport aircraft, airplanes or helicopters used to deliver troops, weapons, and military equipment, usually outside of the commercial flight routes in uncontrolled airspace, and employed historically to deliver airborne forces and tow military gliders; sometimes also called military cargo aircraft.
