= Shaanxi Aircraft Corporation =

Chinese aircraft manufacturer

Coordinates: 33.141791°N 107.198925°E

- Type: Subsidiary
- Industry: Defense
- Founded: 1969; 57 years ago
- Headquarters: Hanzhong, Shaanxi, China
- Key people: Li Guangxing (Chairman)
- Products: Military aircraft, transport aircraft
- Total assets: CN¥5 billion
- Number of employees: 10000
- Parent: Aviation Industry Corporation of China (AVIC)
- Website: https://www.saic.avic.com

Shaanxi Aircraft Corporation (Chinese: 陕飞集团; pinyin: Shǎnfēi Jítuán) is a Chinese aircraft manufacturer and supplier to the Chinese military based in Hanzhong, Shaanxi province. It is a subsidiary of the Aviation Industry Corporation of China (AVIC).

== Products ==
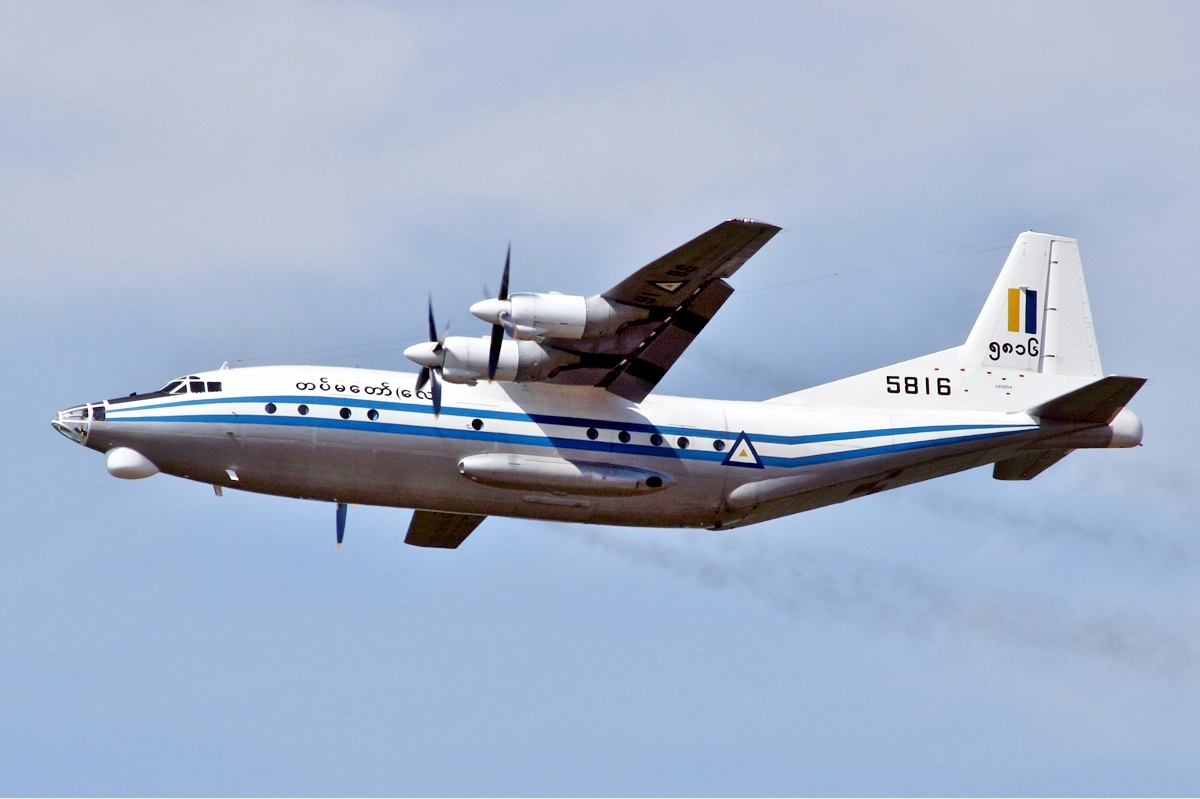
Shaanxi Y-8

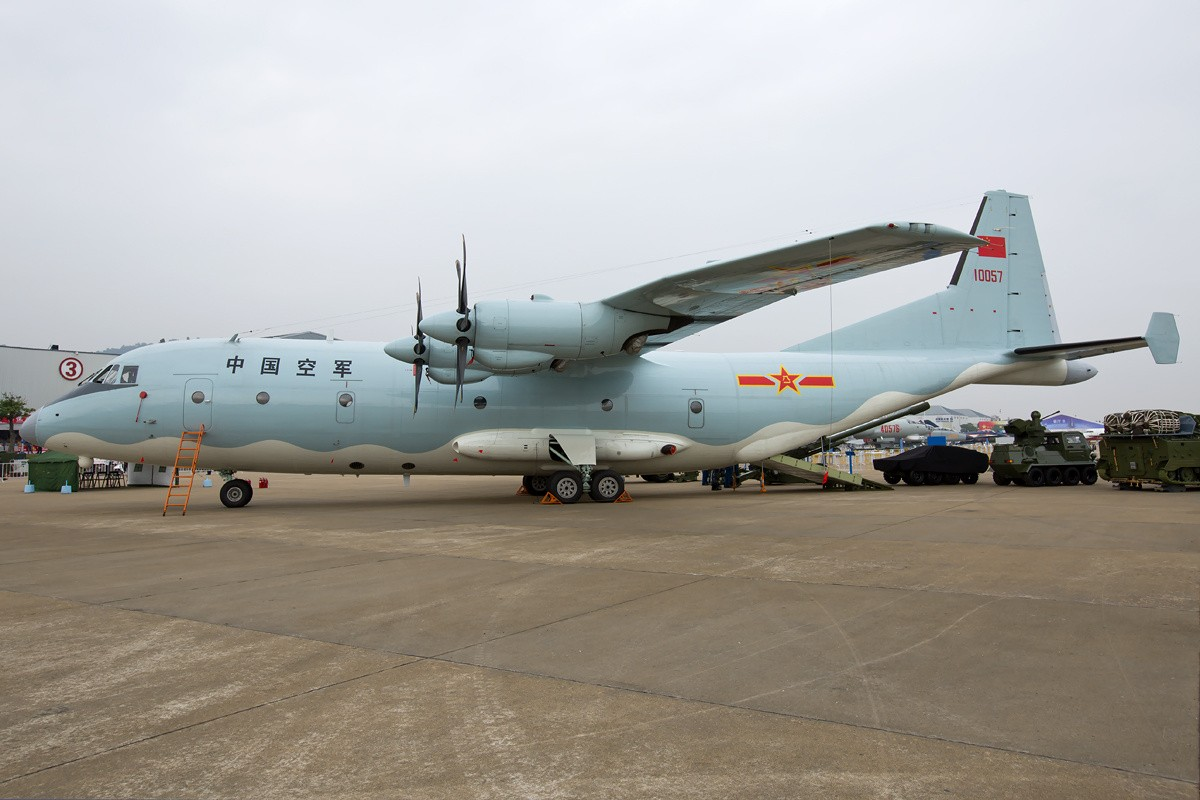
Shaanxi Y-9 at the 2014 Zhuhai Airshow

=== Transports ===
- Shaanxi Y-8 medium size, medium range transport, licensed derivative of the Antonov An-12
  - Y-8 ESM ESM aircraft
  - Y-8 C3I airborne command post aircraft
  - Y-8 battlefield surveillance
  - Y-8 radar test bed
  - Y-8 maritime patrol aircraft
  - Y-8 avionics test bed
  - Y-8-F600 transport
- Y-9 multi-purpose transport, developed as a stretched version of the Shaanxi Y-8F with greater payload and range. The Y-9 is considered China's attempt to build a C-130J class transport aircraft.
- Shaanxi Y-15 tactical transport aircraft visually resembling the A400M with the performance of a C-130J, which made its first flight on December 16, 2025.
- Y-5 transport, copy of the Antonov An-2
- Y-7 transport, copy of the Antonov An-24

== See also ==
- Aviation Industry Corporation of China
- Changhe Aircraft Industries Corporation
- Chengdu Aircraft Industry Group
- ACAC consortium
- Guizhou Aircraft Industry Co.
- Harbin Aircraft Industry Group
- Hongdu Aviation Industry Corporation
- Shanghai Aviation Industrial Company
- Shenyang Aircraft Corporation
- Xi'an Aircraft Industrial Corporation
