= Shaanxi Y-8 =

Chinese medium military transport aircraft

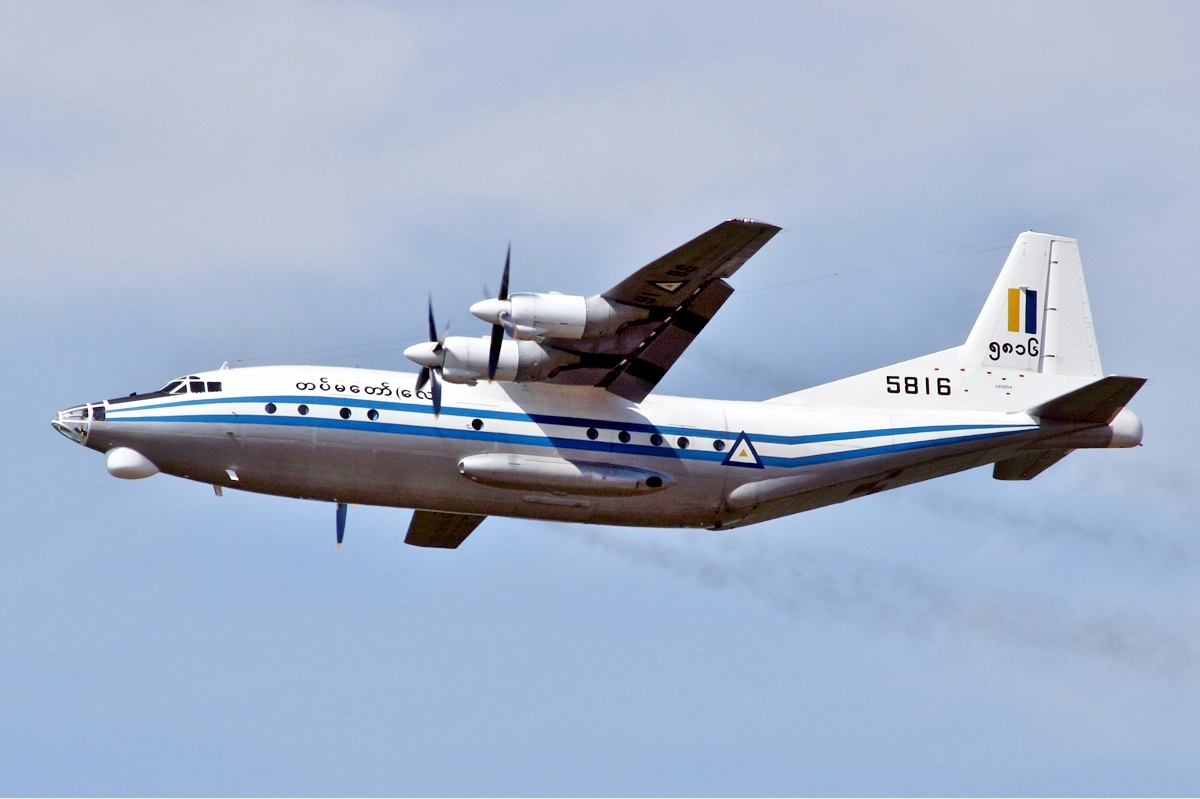
- Y-8 of the Myanmar Air Force

General information
- Type: Military transport aircraft / Maritime patrol aircraft
- National origin: China
- Manufacturer: Shaanxi Aircraft Corporation
- Status: In service, in production
- Primary users: People's Liberation Army Air Force People's Liberation Army Navy Air Force; Myanmar Air Force; Pakistan Air Force
- Number built: 169 (2010)

History
- Manufactured: 1981–present
- First flight: 25 December 1974
- Developed from: Antonov An-12
- Variant: Shaanxi KJ-200
- Developed into: Shaanxi Y-9

The Shaanxi Y-8 or Yunshuji Y-8 (Chinese: 运-8; pinyin: Yùn Bā) aircraft is a medium-size, four-engine turboprop military transport aircraft produced by Shaanxi Aircraft Corporation in China, based on the Soviet Antonov An-12. It has become one of China's most popular military and civilian transport/cargo aircraft, with many variants produced and exported. Although the Soviet Union ended production of the An-12 in 1973, the Chinese Y-8 continues to be upgraded and produced. An estimated 169 Y-8 aircraft had been built by 2010.

== Design and development ==
=== Imported An-12 ===
In the 1960s, China purchased several An-12 aircraft from the Soviet Union, along with license to assemble the aircraft locally. However, due to the Sino-Soviet split, the Soviet Union withdrew its technical assistance. The Xi'an Aircraft Company and Xi'an Aircraft Design Institute worked to reverse engineer the An-12 for local production.

=== Domestic ===
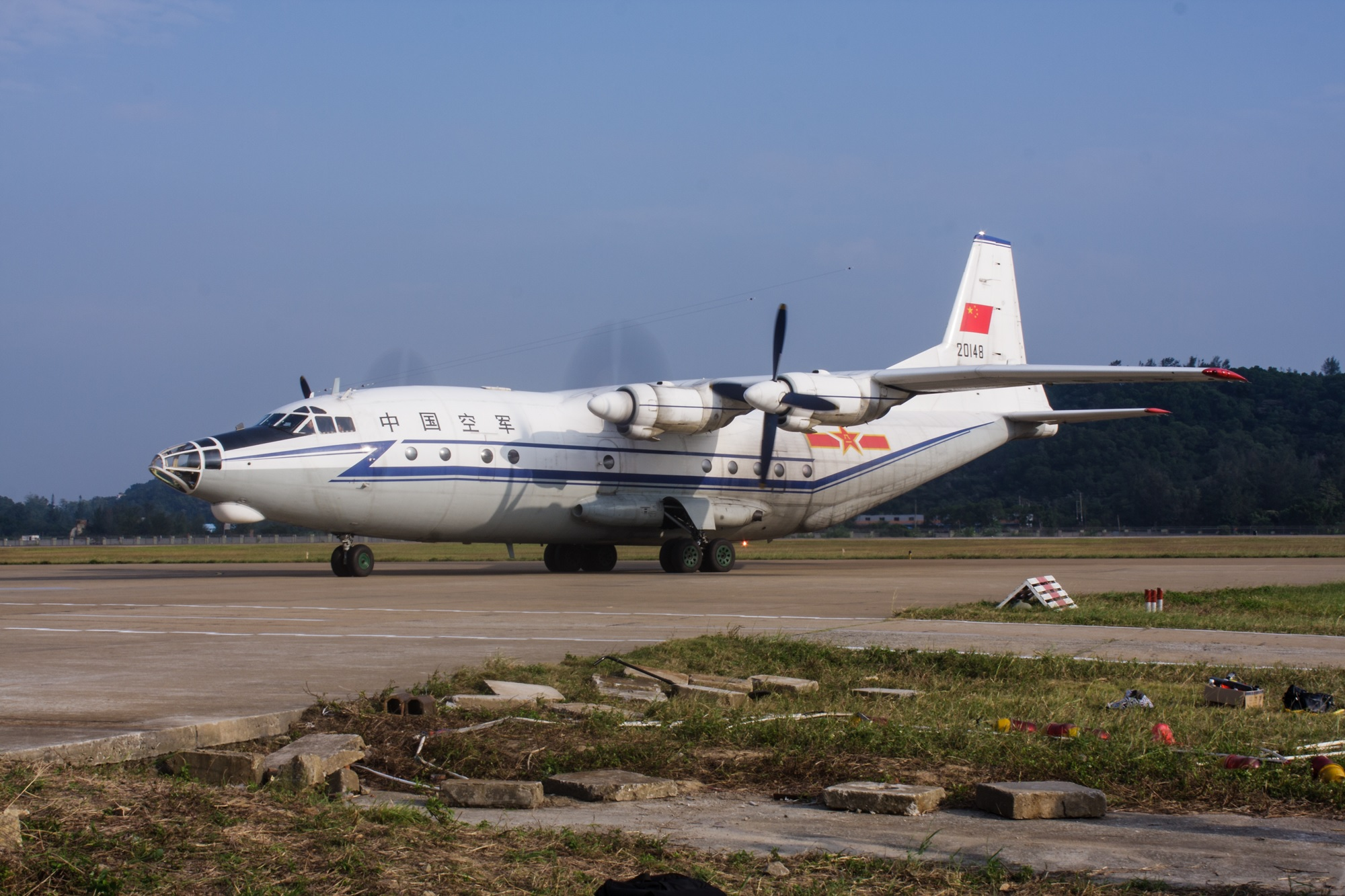
Shaanxi Y-8 of PLA Air Force on 2012.

Design of the aircraft was completed by February 1972. Major features of the Y-8 included a glazed nose and tail turret derived from that of the H-6 bomber, a roller-type palletized-cargo-handling device instead of the overhead conveyor, and a gaseous oxygen system as opposed to a liquid oxygen system. The original Y-8 inherited the An-12's twin 23 mm cannon tail turret, but this was removed on subsequent variants.

The Y-8 is equipped with four turboprop engines mounted under the leading edges of non-swept wings. The wings are attached high on the fuselage, and the tricycle landing gear is equipped with low pressure tires. The earliest versions used for the transportation of freight or troops had two side-hinged, inward-opening doors, while later variants used a rearward-facing ramp to facilitate loading and unloading of the payload. Some specialized versions omit the cargo ramp entirely.

The Y-8 is capable of carrying troops, dropping supplies, parachute drops, and functioning as an air ambulance. It also can be used for commercial purposes as a freighter. It is capable of hauling 20 tons of cargo, approximately 96 soldiers, or about 82 paratroopers in the cargo compartment which is 13.5 metres long, 3 metres wide and 2.4 metres high. It can also carry 60 severely wounded soldiers with their stretchers, 20 slightly injured soldiers and 3 medical attendants. Many variants for specialized roles have been built, but information on them can be vague or difficult to obtain due to the secretive nature of the Chinese military.

=== Another first flight ===
The Y-8 transport aircraft was put into trial production in the Xi'an Aircraft Factory in June 1972. By December 1974, the first Chinese-assembled Y-8 conducted its maiden flight. Following trial production of the first Y-8s, operations were transferred to the Shaanxi Aircraft Factory. The Shaanxi-produced Y-8s conducted their test flights in December 1975. After a regime of 66 test flights the Y-8 was officially certified for use by the Chinese government. By 1981, the Y-8 entered serial production. Mr. Ouyang Shaoxiu (欧阳绍修) would eventually become the general designer, designing many variants of Y-8, including KJ-200.

=== Modification ===
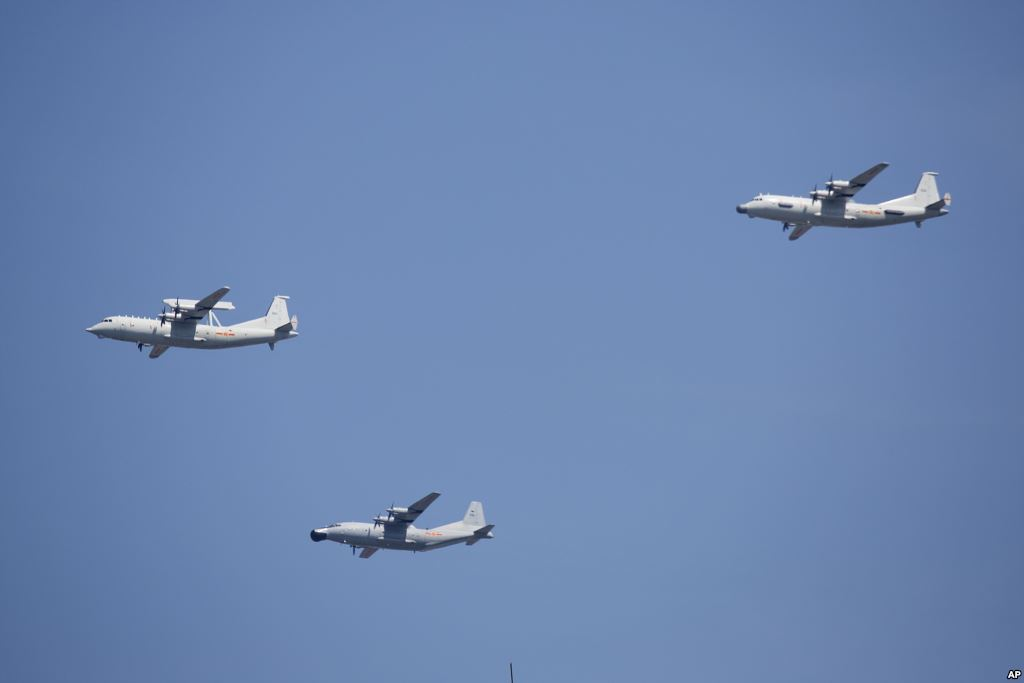
A KJ-200 airborne early warning and control plane, left, a Y-8J radar plane, center, and a Y-9JB radar plane, right, fly in formation during a parade commemorating the 70th anniversary of Japan's surrender during World War II in Beijing, Sept. 3, 2015.

In the early 1980s, Chinese officials saw US Army recruiting advertisements featuring parachute extraction of an Army jeep along with troops. The PLA was told to develop this kind of capability, but there were two design problems. The first design flaw was that Y-8 wings have very sharp leading edges, so one wing tends to stall before the other, causing the aircraft to roll inverted as it stalls. The second design flaw was that the cargo deck of the Y-8 had a 10-degree downward slope starting at the landing gear.

When the PLA Air Force started to test parachute extraction, these two design flaws caused a near disaster. The aircraft was flying too fast, and when the parachute started to extract cargo from the hold, the cargo rolled on the deck until it got to the 10-degree downward slope, and there it became airborne while still inside the aircraft. The cargo hit the top of the cargo door on the way out, making it clear that the Y-8 could not do parachute cargo extraction.

In 1986, two engineers from Beijing's Ministry of Aviation visited Lockheed. They could not speak very much English, and the Lockheed-Georgia sales person who met them could not speak Chinese. So for half a day, they did a point-and-grunt tour until they found a Lockheed employee who could speak Chinese. The Chinese wanted to purchase Lockheed wind tunnel testing on the Y-8 in order to address the stall problem.

As a result of these wind tunnel tests, conducted in 1986, Lockheed was given a contract to do a flight test series on the Y-8. Lockheed was told that flight test data was not provided by the Soviets when they helped China build the Y-8 factory. The flight test series was flown by Lockheed test pilot Hank Dees. Hank had flown the test flight series for the Lockheed L-1011 and later for China's Y-12 in Harbin.

During this flight test series, Hank Dees flew the aircraft to stall speed and taught Chinese pilots how to anticipate a stall in order to prevent letting the aircraft go inverted. As a result of this test flight series, Chinese pilots started to use the 45 degree flap position.

Lockheed's motive for doing flight tests was to demonstrate that China would be better off buying the C-130 rather than trying to improve the Y-8. China did buy C-130s, but the flight test series actually demonstrated that the Y-8 was a more capable aircraft than previously believed.

In the late 1980s, Lockheed Martin, the American manufacturer of the C-130 Hercules, helped China to develop a pressurized cabin for the passenger version of Y-8, resulting in two versions: the first had half of the cabin pressurized and later, the second version in which the complete cabin was pressurized.

In 2001 and 2002, new consulting arrangements between Antonov and Shaanxi resulted in modernized redesigns to the Y-8's wing and fuselage. As a consequence the redesign allows the Y-8's fuel capacity to be increased by 50 percent.

== Operational history ==
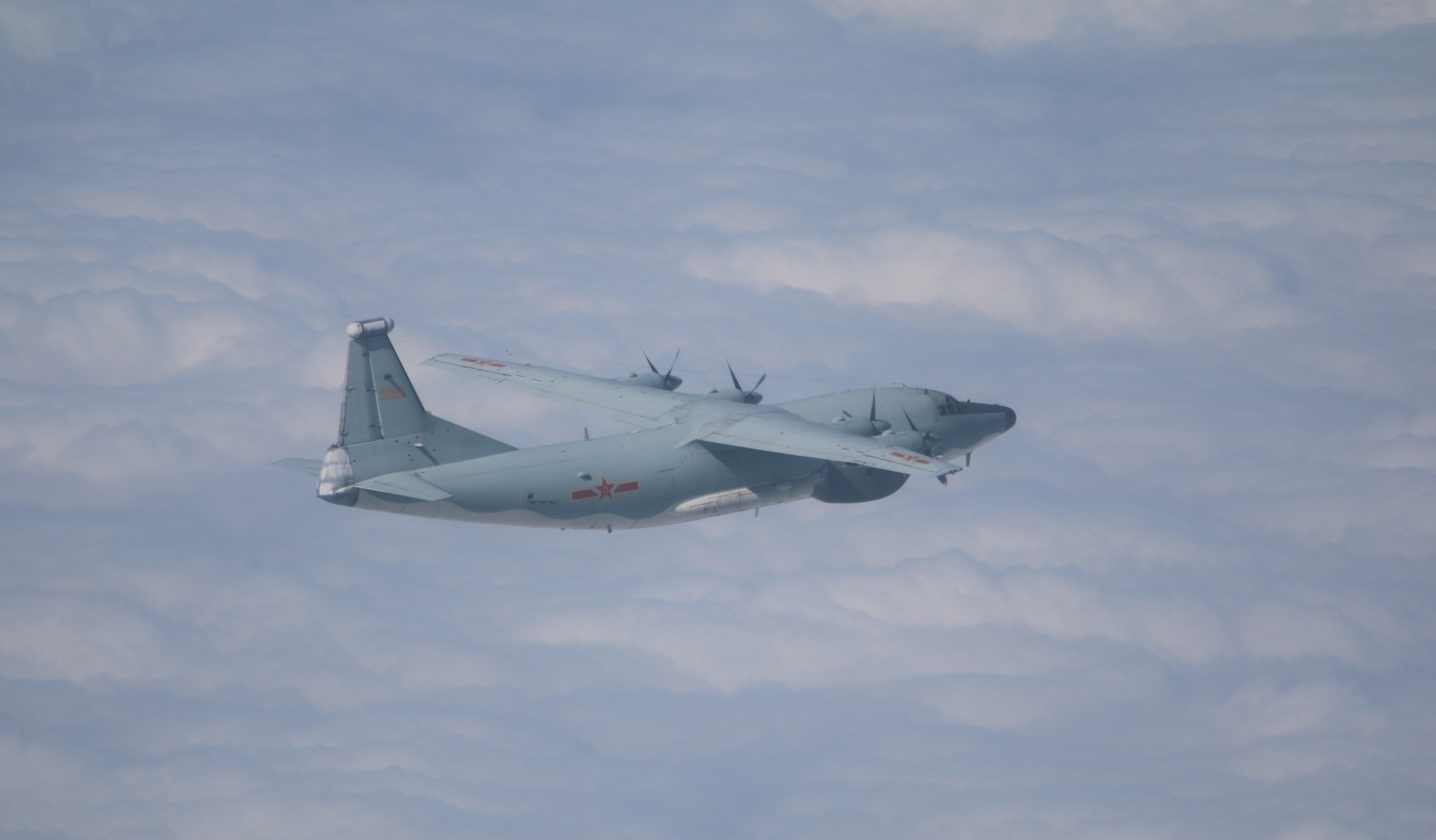
A Shaanxi Y-8 flying on 2020

Y-8s have been used by the PLAAF and PLANAF in a wide variety of roles and some have been supplied to civilian operators. Export aircraft have been supplied to the Myanmar Republic air force, Sudanese Air Force and the Sri Lankan Air Force. Some Y-8 aircraft were used by the Sri Lanka Air Force as makeshift bombers, dropping bombs from the rear doors, during the country's civil war, losing two units, one to Tamil Tiger anti-aircraft defences and the second to mechanical failure.

In Chinese National Day military parade 2009, the Air Force KJ-200 took the role as a lead plane. It had been exported to other countries around the world including Burma, Pakistan, Sri Lanka, Sudan, Tanzania, Venezuela, and possibly others.

Y-8s are in operational use with the National Guard of Kazakhstan.

== Variants ==
- Y-8: The baseline unpressurized transport aircraft produced primarily for transport duties with the PLAAF.
- Y-8A: Helicopter transport aircraft with rear loading ramp, travelling gantry removed and a hydraulically operated steady under the rear door.
- Y-8AF: ASW platform under tests, with extended magnetic anomaly detector at the tail, the latest military version, looks similar to Y-8 Mineral research plane.
- Y-8B: Unpressurised freight/passenger transport aircraft for CAAC.
- Y-8C: Fully pressurised transport version with the rear cargo ramp of the Y-8B.
- Y-8CA: (a.k.a. 'High New 1') Electronic Countermeasures aircraft with extensive arrays of aerials and a ventral canoe.
- Y-8CB: ECM variant, characterized by a sharp pointed nose cone.
- Y-8D: Export military transport fitted with western avionics. The initial Y-8D was superseded by the Y-8DII.
- Y-8DZ: (Dianzi Zhencha 电子侦察 - ELINT) (a.k.a.'High New 2') Electronic signals intelligence version characterized by the cylindrical array just in front of the vertical stabilizer.
- Y-8E: Drone carrier aircraft for launching WZ-5 Chang Hong-1 (Chang Hong 长虹 - long rainbow) reconnaissance drone, reverse-engineered Ryan Firebee, to replace Tu-4 drone launcher.
- Y-8F: Livestock transport aircraft with three tiers of cages either side of a central aisle, able to accommodate 350 sheep or goats. The livestock transport was developed to allow access to remote seasonal pastures.
- Y-8FQ: Maritime Patrol variant with modified tail housing a boom-mounted magnetic anomaly detector to detect submarines.
- Y-8F-100: Fitted with more powerful engines, EFIS, colour weather radar, TCAS and GPS.
- Y-8F-200: This model has a 2.2m (7 ft 10in) stretched fuselage. Capacity: 23 tons.
- Y-8F-200WA: Exported to Kazakhstan
- Y-8F-300: Civil transport with western avionics. Capacity: 23 tons.
- Y-8F-400: As for Y-8F-300 but with pressurised cargo hold. Capacity: 23 tons.
- Y-8F-600: Newest civilian transport variant with a redesigned fuselage, Pratt and Whitney turboprop engines, an Electronic Flight Instrument System "glass cockpit", and a two-person crew. Capacity: 25 tons. Cancelled in 2008 and developed into the Y-9.

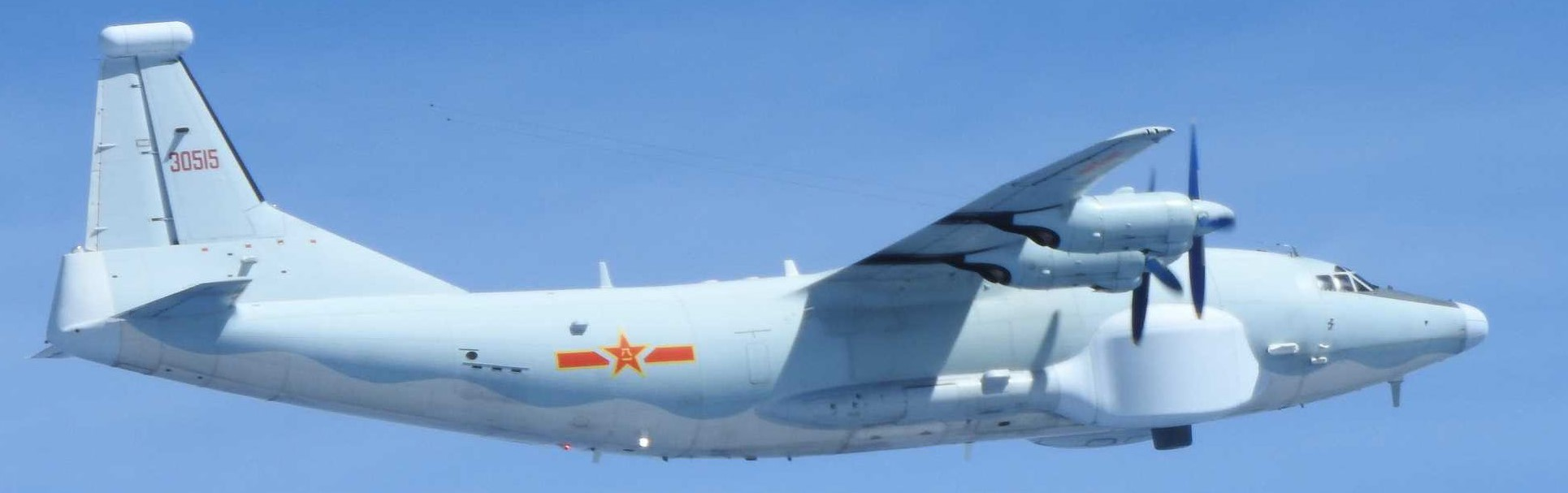
Y-8GX4 (August 2017)

- Y-8GX1: (Gaoxin 高新 - high-tech); Electronic Warfare (VHF/UHF Tactical Jamming).
- Y-8GX3: Airborne Command Post and ECM version a.k.a. 'High New 3' based on the Y-8F-200.
- Y-8GX4: ELINT platform (project).
- Y-8GX7: Electronic attack (radio propaganda/psyops). At least 3 known to be in service stationed in Fujian.
- Y-8G: IFR tanker. (project). Also identified as the Y-8GX3.
- Y-8H: Aerial survey aircraft.
- Y-8J: AWACS aircraft with British GEC-Marconi Argus-2000 (RACAL Skymaster) L-band pulse-doppler search radar in a large nose radome, with work stations for the operators in the cargo hold. Reputedly fully pressurised but lacking the cargo ramp associated with pressurised cargo holds.
- Y-8J: AEW aircraft with Sky Master radar.
- Y-8JB: ELINT variant. Also identified as Y-8GX2.
- Y-8JY: Medevac aircraft.
- Y-8K: 121-seat airliner.
- Y-8Q: ASW variant, surface search radar, FLIR, internal bomb bay, SATCOM, and tail MAD. Also identified in one source as Y-8GX6.
- Y-8T: C3I command post and battlefield surveillance aircraft based on the Y-8F-400. Some sources claim it is an ECM aircraft. Also identified as the Y-8GX4.
- Y-8U: Experimental aircraft equipped with British Mk 32 aerial refueling pods for the development of Chinese aerial refueling technology.
- Y-8W: An AWACS version of the KJ-200 with 'Balance Beam phased array radar mounted above the fuselage. Also identified as Y-8GX5 or Y-8WH.
- Y-8X: (Xun 巡 - surveillance) Maritime Patrol Aircraft with western avionics, radar, mission systems and defensive aids. Some aircraft have been known to carry ELINT packages. Equipped with Litton Canada AN/APS-504(V) search radar for maritime surveillance missions. This version is characterized by a larger cylindrical radar radome under the nose similar to that on H-6 bomber.
- Y-8XZ: a psychological warfare aircraft for broadcasting TV and radio propaganda. Also identified as the Y-8GX7.
- Y-8 AWACS: Characterized by the large Rotodome strut supported over the rear fuselage and the triple tail configuration with large trapezoidal auxiliary fins at the tips of the tailplane, similar to the Beriev A-50.
- Y-8 AWACS: Another AWACS version was studied at Shaanxi with large radomes at nose and tail in similar fashion to the abortive AEW Nimrod.
- Y-8 Geophysical Survey Aircraft: Characterized by the extended magnetic anomaly detector at the tail, for finding potential mine sites, similar in appearance to an anti-submarine warfare platform and is often mistaken for the latter.
- Y-8 Anti-Submarine Aircraft: New anti-submarine variant revealed in 2012. The anti-submarine variant has a large air-to-surface search radar, a side-looking ISAR radar and a magnetic anomaly detection tube.
- Y-8EW: New EW aircraft.

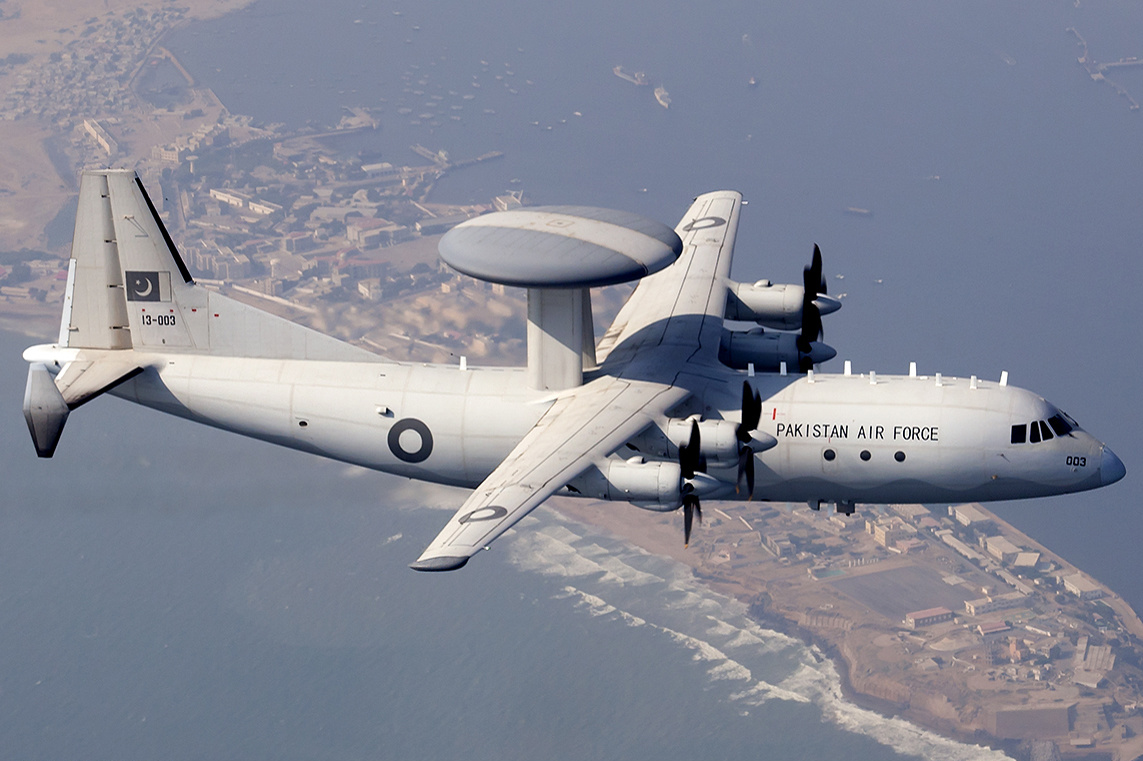
Pakistan Air Force ZDK-03 inflight over Manora Cantonment (September 2013)

- Y-8 Gunship: A projected gunship version based on the Y-8C with two heavy cannon and ports for three heavy machine-guns on the port side of the aircraft. Weapons aiming and target acquisition achieved by gyro-stabilised optoelectronic sighting system in a ball turret under the nose. A steerable searchlight would be installed in a pod under the port outer wing, as well as ESM and/or ECM pods as required.
- ZDK-03: A variant designed specifically for export to the Pakistan Air Force, with a total of 4 ordered. Consists of a Chinese AESA radar mounted on the Y-8F600 platform. The radar is reported to have a greater range than that of the PAF's Saab 2000 Erieye AEW&C radar and the aircraft incorporates open architecture electronics to make future upgrades easier to implement. Delivery of the first aircraft to the Pakistan Air Force was expected by the end of 2010. The first aircraft was reported to have been delivered on October 12, 2011, and the fourth and last aircraft delivered on Feb 26, 2015.
- ZDK-06: An export-oriented airborne warning and control system featuring the JY-06 active electronically scanned array and Pulse-Doppler radar.
- KJ-200: Airborne early warning & control aircraft based on the Y-8F-600.

== Operators ==
China

- People's Liberation Army Air Force
- People's Liberation Army Ground Force
- People's Liberation Army Navy Air Force

Kazakhstan

- National Guard of Kazakhstan

Myanmar

- Myanmar Air Force

Pakistan

- Pakistan Air Force

Sri Lanka

- Sri Lanka Air Force (retired)

Sudan

- Sudanese Air Force (retired)

Tanzania

- Tanzanian Air Force

Venezuela

- Venezuelan Air Force - 8 Y-8F purchased in 2011

== Specifications (Y-8) ==
Data from Sinodefence.com

General characteristics

- Crew: 5, 3, or 2 (Y-8F600)
- Capacity: ≈90 equipped troops / 20,000 kg (44,092 lb) payload
- Length: 34.02 m (111 ft 7 in)
- Wingspan: 38 m (124 ft 8 in)
- Height: 11.16 m (36 ft 7 in)
- Wing area: 121.9 m^{2} (1,312 sq ft)
- Airfoil: root: C-5-18; tip: C-3-14
- Empty weight: 35,490 kg (78,242 lb)
- Max takeoff weight: 61,000 kg (134,482 lb)
- Powerplant: 4 × Zhuzhou WoJiang-6 (WJ-6) turboprop engines, 3,170 kW (4,250 hp) each
- Propellers: 4-bladed constant-speed propellers

Performance

- Maximum speed: 660 km/h (410 mph, 360 kn)
- Cruise speed: 550 km/h (340 mph, 300 kn)
- Range: 5,615 km (3,489 mi, 3,032 nmi)
- Service ceiling: 10,400 m (34,100 ft)
- Rate of climb: 10 m/s (2,000 ft/min)

Armament

- Guns: 2× 23 mm (0.906 in) cannon in tail turret (early models only)

== See also ==
- Military transport aircraft

Related development

- Antonov An-10
- Antonov An-12
- Shaanxi Y-9

Aircraft of comparable role, configuration, and era

- Lockheed C-130 Hercules
- Transall C-160
