= List of People's Liberation Army Air Force airbases =

This is a list of air bases operated by the People's Liberation Army Air Force (PLAAF). Facilities included in the list include all aerodromes at which the PLAAF maintains a regular presence. These may include those exclusively for military use as well as those portions of mixed-use aerodromes operated by the military. It may also include facilities in other countries at which the PLAAF controls a portion of facilities for regular operations.

Each listed air base includes the following elements of information as known.

1. Primary air base name. The official or most commonly used name for the military portion of the aerodrome
2. Chinese name. Simplified (mainland) Chinese characters for the primary name (not including characters for air base or air field)
3. Alternate names. Other names used to describe the military portion or larger aerodrome including civilian name
4. IATA Code. IATA location identifier issued by the International Air Transport Association
5. ICAO Code. ICAO airport codes issued by the International Civil Aviation Organization. Typically air bases used strictly by military forces and closed to civil aviation are given an identifier in the form of "CN-XXXX".
6. Use. Military, civilian, or dual-use (current)
7. Subordination. The higher command to which the air base is assigned; this is often a theater command air force
8. Coordinates. The coordinates for the aerodrome; linked to the geo-hack, adjusted as necessary to avoid the Wu-shift
9. Runways. Direction and length (in meters) of operational runways
10. Tenants. Units known or suspected to maintain a presence on the air base and their aircraft

== Current air bases ==
Name	Chinese	Alternate names	IATA	ICAO	Use	Subordinate	Coordinates	Runways	Tenants	#
Anqing Air Base	安庆	Anqing Tianzhushan Airport	AQG	ZSAQ	Dual	ETCAF	30.58333°N 117.05000°E	06/24: 2,800 m	28th Bomber Regiment (H-6K)	1
Anshan Air Base	鞍山	Anshan Teng'ao Airport	AOG	ZYAS	Dual	NTCAF	41.10583°N 122.85389°E	02/20: 2,000 m	1st Fighter Brigade J-20A	2
Bailian Air Base	白蓮	Liuzhou Bailian Airport	LZH	ZGZH	Dual	STCAF	24.20778°N 109.39139°E	16/34: 2,500 m	126th Fighter Brigade (JH-7A)	3
Baishiyi Air Base	白市	Chongqing Baishiyi Airport	N/A	CN-0030	Military	STCAF, WTCAF	29.49583°N 106.35917°E	01/19: 2,272 m	98th Fighter Brigade (J-11, J-16, Su-27), 99th Fighter Brigade (J-7II, JH-7A)	4
Bengbu Air Base	蚌埠	Bengbu Airport	BFU	ZSBB	Dual	PLAAF HQ	32.84778°N 117.32028°E	07/25: 2,600 m	4th Training Regiment (JL-8, JL-9, JL-10)	5
Changsha Air Base	长沙	Changsha Datuopu Airport	CSX	ZGCS	Military	STCAF	28.06917°N 112.95750°E	18/36: 2,490 m	54th Air Brigade (Su-30MKK), Changsha Aircraft Factory (H-6)	6
Chaoyangchuan Air Base	朝阳川	Yanji Chaoyangchuan	YNJ	ZYYJ	Dual	NTCAF	42.88278°N 129.45083°E	09/27: 2,600 m	61st Fighter Brigade (J-10, Y-5)	7
Chenggu Air Base	城固	Hanzhong Chenggu Airport	HZG	ZLHZ	Dual	NTCAF	33.13417°N 107.20389°E	07/25: 2,500 m	Aerial Survey Regiment (An-30, Y-8, Y-12), Shaanxi Aircraft Corp.	8
Chifeng Air Base	赤峰	Chifeng Yulong Airport	CIF	ZBCF	Dual	NTCAF	42.15972°N 118.84083°E	03/21: 2,800 m	2nd Fighter Brigade (J-10C)	9
Dafangshen Air Base	大房身	Changchun Dafanshen Airport	CGQ	ZYCC	Military	PLAAF HQ	43.90667°N 125.19750°E	06/24: 2,800 m	1st Training Regiment (CJ-6, JL-8, JJ-7)	10
Dongta Air Base	东塔	Shenyang Dongta Airport	SHE	ZYYY	Dual	NTCAF	41.78417°N 123.49639°E	06/24: 2,400 m	Factory 5704	11
Ertaizi Air Base	二台子	Jilin Ertaizi Airport	JIL	ZYJL	Military	NTCAF	44.00222°N 126.39417°E	06/24: 2,600 km		12
Fenghuangshan Air Base	凤凰山	Chengdu Fenghuangshan Airport	N/A		Military	WTCAF	30°42′19″N 103°57′01″E			13
Fiery Cross Reef	永暑礁	Yongshu Airport	N/A	CN-0029	Military	STCAF	9.54667°N 112.88667°E	05/23: 3,300 m		14
Fouliang Air Base	浮梁县	Jingdezhen Luojia Airport	JDZ	ZSJD	Dual	ETCAF	29.33944°N 117.17667°E	04/22: 2,400 m		15
Fuzhou Air Base	福州	Fuzhou Yixu Airport	FOC	ZSFZ	Military	ETCAF	26.00389°N 119.31278°E	08/26: 2,400 m	5th Fendui (J-6)	16
Gaoqi Air Base	高崎	Xiamen Gaoqi International Airport	XMN	ZSAM	Dual	ETCAF	24°32′0″N 118°7′0″E	05/23: 3,400 m		17
Gonggar Air Base	贡嘎	Lhasa Gonggar Airport	LXA	ZULS	Dual	WTCAF	29.29806°N 90.91222°E	09L/27R: 4,000 m	J-10, J-11, KJ-500	18
Guangzhou East Air Base	广州东	Cencun Airport	N/A	CN-0059	Dual	STCAF	23.16472°N 113.36917°E	32/14: 1,800 m	Y-7, Z-8, Z-9, Mi-17	19
Hailang Air Base	海浪	Mudanjiang Hailang International Airport	MDG	ZYMD	Dual	NTCAF	44.52472°N 129.56917°E	04/22: 2,600 m	63rd Air Brigade	20
Hami Air Base	哈密	Hami Airport	HMI	ZWHM	Dual	WTCAF	42.84167°N 93.66861°E	11/29: 2,400 m	2nd Training Brigade (JL-9)	21
Harbin-Ping Fan Tien Air Base	哈尔滨平房	Harbin-Pingfang Airport	N/A		Military	NTCAF	45.59889°N 126.66083°E	08/26: 2,200 m	Harbin Aircraft Manufacturing Corp.	22
Hetian Air Base	和田	Hotan Airport	HTN	ZWTN	Dual	WTCAF	37.04000°N 79.86167°E	11/29: 3,200 m		23
Huairen Air Base	怀仁	Datong Huairen Airport, Shuozhou Huairen Airport	N/A	CN-0015	Military	CTCAF	39.71750°N 113.14472°E	04/22: 3,200 m	15th Fighter Division, 43rd Air Brigade (J-10)	24
Huangguoshu Air Base	黄果	Anshun Huangguoshu Airport	AVA	ZUAS	Dual	STCAF	26.26083°N 105.87389°E	08/26: 2,800 m	Guizhou Aviation Industry Company Shuangyang Aircraft Manufactory	25
Huangtianba Air Base	黄田坝	Chengdu Huangtianba Airbase, Chengdu Wenjiang Airport	N/A	CN-0026	Military	STCAF	30.70333°N 103.94944°E	02/20: 2,550 m	Chengdu Aircraft Corp.	26
Huxian Air Base	户县	Huxian Airport	N/A	CN-0137	Military	WTCAF	34.15306°N 108.59972°E	08/26: 3,030 m	1st Training Brigade (Z-9, Y-7)	27
Jianqiao Air Base	笕桥	Hangzhou Jianqiao Airport	HGH	ZSHC	Military	ETCAF	30.33528°N 120.24083°E	07/25: 3,200 m	83rd Fighter Brigade	28
Jiaxing Air Base	嘉兴	Jiaxing Airport	N/A	CN-0154	Military	ETCAF, WTCAF	30.70556°N 120.67417°E	05/23: 3,400 m	84th Fighter Brigade (JH-7A)	29
Jining Air Base	济宁	Jining Qufu Airport	JNG	ZSJG	Dual	CTCAF	35.29278°N 116.34639°E	09/27: 2,800 m	55th Fighter Brigade (J-11, Su-27)	30
Jinjiang Air Base	晋江	Quanzhou Jinjiang International Airport	JJN	ZSQZ	Dual	STCAF	24.79722°N 118.58917°E	03/21: 2,600 m		31
Kaifeng Air Base	开封	N/A	N/A	CN-0095	Military	CTCAF	34.75333°N 114.33778°E	03/21: 2,462 m		32
Kashi Air Base	喀什	Kashgar Airport	KHG	ZWSH	Dual	WTCAF	39.54250°N 76.02000°E	08/26: 3,200 m		33
Korla Air Base	库尔勒	Korla Licheng Airport	KRL	ZWKL	Dual	WTCAF	41.61500°N 86.14167°E	04/22: 2,780 m		34
Langtou Air Base	浪头	Dandong Langtou Airport	DDG	ZYDD	Dual	NTCAF	40.02556°N 124.28694°E	01/19: 2,600 m		35
Lantian Air Base	蓝田	Luzhou Lantian Airport	LZO	ZULZ	Military	WTCAF	28.85250°N 105.39250°E	07/25: 2,400 m		36
Li Chia Tsun Air Base	李家村	Guilin Qifengling Airport	KWL	ZGKL	Military	STCAF	25.19389°N 110.32028°E	18/36: 2,300 m		37
Liancheng Air Base	连城	Longyan Guanzhaishan Airport	LCX	ZSLD	Dual	ETCAF	25.67639°N 116.74611°E	03/21: 2,400 m		38
Liangping Air Base	梁平	Liangping Airport	LIA	ZULP	Military	WTCAF	30.67944°N 107.78611°E	05/23: 2,300 m		39
Lintong Air Base	临潼	Xi'an Xiguan Airport	SIA	ZLSN	Military	CTCAF	34.37611°N 109.11917°E	05/23: 2,800 m		40
Lishe Air Base	栎社	Ningbo Lishe International Airport	NGB	ZSNB	Dual	ETCAF	29.82639°N 121.46250°E	13/31: 3,000 m		41
Luhe-Ma'an Air Base	六合马鞍	Liuhe Air Base, Nanjing Luhe Airport, Nanjing Air Base	N/A	CN-0224	Military	NTCAF	32.37778°N 118.79417°E	05/23: 2,600 m		42
Luliang Air Base	陆良	N/A	N/A	CN-0041	Military	STCAF	24.98806°N 103.64278°E	02/20: 2,651 m		43
Luqiao Air Base	路桥	Taizhou Luqiao Airport	HYN	ZSLQ	Dual	ETCAF	28°34′0″N 121°26′0″E	03/21: 2,500 m		44
Mahuiling Air Base	马回岭	Jiujiang Lushan Airport	JIU	ZSJJ	Military	ETCAF	29.47694°N 115.80167°E	04/22: 2,800 m		45
Malan Air Base	马兰基地	N/A	N/A	N/A	Military	WTCAF	42.18°N 87.18°E			46
Mangshi Air Base	芒市	Dehong Mangshi Airport	LUM	ZPMS	Military	STCAF	24.4°N 98.533333°E	05/23: 2,200 m		47
Meixian Air Base	梅县	Mei-Xian Air Base, Meizhou Meixian Changgangi International Airport	MXZ	ZGMX	Dual	STCAF	24.26500°N 116.10000°E	04/22: 2,400 m		48
Mengzi Air Base	蒙自	Honghe Mengzi Airport	N/A	N/A	Dual	STCAF	23.39444°N 103.33444°E	14/32: 2,500 m		49
Nanyuan Air Base	南苑	Beijing Nanyuan Airport	NAY	ZBNY	Dual	PLAAF HQ	39.78083°N 116.38639°E	18/36: 3,200 m		50
Ngari Gunsa Air Base	阿里昆莎	Ngari Gunsa Airport, Shiquanhe Airport, Ali Kunsha Airport	NGQ	ZUAL	Dual	WTCAF	32.10417°N 80.05417°E	15/33: 4,500 m		51
Pengshen Air Base	彭山	N/A	N/A	CN-0248	Military	WTCAF	30.2647778°N 103.8512250°E	18/36: 2,600 m		52
Pudong Air Base	浦东	Shanghai Pudong International Airport	PVG	ZSPD	Dual	ETCAF	31.14500°N 121.79333°E	17L/35R: 4,000 m; 16R/34L: 3,800 m; 17R/35L: 3,400 m; 16L/34R: 3,800 m; 15/33: 3,400 m		53
Qionglai Air Base	邛崃	N/A	N/A	CN-0045	Military	WTCAF	30.49028°N 103.46528°E	02L/20R: 3,000 m; 02R/20L: 3,300 m		54
Qiqihar Air Base	齐齐哈	Qiqihar Sanjiazi Airport	NDG	ZYQQ	Dual	NTCAF	47.23972°N 123.91833°E	17/35: 2,600 m		55
Qizhou Air Base	五台山	Xinzhou Witaishan Airport	WUT	ZBXZ	Military	CTCAF	38.59806°N 112.96861°E	08/26: 2,600 m		56
Quzhou Air Base	衢州	Quzhou Airport	JUZ	ZSJU	Dual	ETCAF	28.96639°N 118.89944°E	06/24: 2,500 m		57
Shadi Air Base	沙堤	Foshan Shadi Airport	FUO	ZGFS	Military	STCAF	23.08333°N 113.07000°E	01/19: 2,800 m	4th Fighter Brigade	58
Shangqiu Air Base	商丘	Shangqiu Airport	N/A	CN-0074	Military	CTCAF	34.44944°N 115.45944°E	06/24: 2,500 m		59
Shanhaiguan Air Base	山海关	Qinhuangdao Shanhaiguan Airport	SHP	ZBSH	Military	CTCAF	39.96833°N 119.73056°E	06/24: 2,500 m		60
Shantou Waisha Air Base	汕头外砂	N/A	SWA	ZGOW	Dual	STCAF	23.42694°N 116.76222°E	04/22: 2,500 m		61
Shaodong Air Base	邵东	N/A	N/A		Military	STCAF	27.22639°N 111.67028°E	05/23: 2,800 m		62
Shaoguan Air Base	韶关	Shaoguan Danxia Airport	HSC	ZGSG	Dual	STCAF	24.97861°N 113.42083°E	15/33: 2,800 m		63
Shenyang Beiling Air Base	沈阳北陵	Beiling Air Base	N/A	CN-0204	Military	NTCAF	41.87028°N 123.43944°E	02/20: 2,700 m	Shenyang Aircraft Corp.	64
Shek Kong Air Base	石崗	Shek Kong Airfield	N/A	VHSK	Dual	STCAF	22.43667°N 114.08028°E	11/29: 1,900 m		65
Shigatse Air Base	日喀	Shigatse Peace Airport, Shigatse Heping Airport	RKZ	ZURK	Dual	WTCAF	29.35222°N 89.28500°E	09/27: 5,000 m; 07/25: 3,000 m		66
Shuofang Air Base	硕放	Sunan Shuofang International Airport	WUX	ZSWX	Dual	ETCAF	31.49722°N 120.43056°E	03/21: 3,200 m		67
Subi Reef Air Base	渚碧礁	Zamora Reef Air Base	N/A	N/A	Military	STCAF	10.91361°N 114.06722°E	03/21: 3,000 m		68
Suzhou Air Base	苏州	Suzhou Guangfu Airport, Suzhou West Airfield	SZV	ZSSZ	Dual	ETCAF	31.26306°N 120.40083°E	18/36: 2,200 m		69
Taihe Air Base	泰和	Jinggangshan Airport	JGS	ZSGS	Dual	ETCAF	26.85722°N 114.73694°E	08/26: 2,600 m		70
Taipingsi Air Base	太平寺	Chengdu Taipingsi Airport, Chengdu City Airport		ZUDS	Military	WTCAF	30.60167°N 104.01417°E	18/36: 2,600 m		71
Tangshan Air Base	唐山	Tangshan Sannühe Airport	TVS	ZBTS	Dual	CTCAF	39.71778°N 118.00278°E	10/28: 2,700 m		72
Tianyang Air Base	田阳	Baise Bama Airport, Tian Yang Air Base	AEB	ZBGS	Dual	STCAF	23.71972°N 106.96083°E	12/30: 2,500 m		73
Wangcun Air Base	王村	Changzhi Wangcun Airport	CIH	ZBCZ	Dual	CTCAF	36.24889°N 113.12639°E	10/19: 2,600 m		74
Weifang Air Base	潍坊	Weifang Nanyuan Airport	WEF	ZSWF	Dual	NTCAF	36.64694°N 119.11889°E	17/35: 2,600 m		75
Weihai Air Base	威海	Weihai International Airport, Weihai Dashuibo Airport, Wendeng Air Base	WEH	ZSWH	Military	NTCAF	37.18694°N 122.22889°E	02/20: 2,600 m		76
Wensu Air Base	阿克	Aksu Hongqipo Airport, Akhsu Onsu Airport	AKU	ZWAK	Dual	WTCAF	41.26306°N 80.28944°E	09/27: 2,400 m		77
Wugong Air Base	武功	N/A	N/A	CN-0134	Military	CTCAF	34.27583°N 108.26583°E	09/27: 3,000 m	108th Bomber Regiment	78
Wuhu Air Base	芜湖	Wuhu Wanli Airport	WHU	ZSWU	Dual	ETCAF	31.39083°N 118.40944°E	08/26: 2,400 m		79
Wuxu Air Base	吴圩	Nanning Wuxu International Airport	NNG	ZGNN	Dual	STCAF	22.60833°N 108.17556°E	05/23: 3,200 m		80
Wuyishan Air Base	武夷山	Wuyishan Airport	WUS	ZSWY	Dual	ETCAF	27.70083°N 118.00028°E	03/21: 2,400 m		81
Xiangtang Air Base	向塘	Nanchang Xiangtang Airport	KHZ	ZSCN	Dual	ETCAF	28.42083°N 115.92444°E	01/19: 2,500 m		82
Yunnanyi Airport	祥云	Xiangyun Air Base, Yunnanyi Airport, Xiangyun Airport, Xianyun Midu Air Base	N/A	CN-0049	Military	STCAF	25.44361°N 100.73417°E	01/19: 2,727 m		83
Shuimen Air Base	水門	Xiapu Air Base	N/A		Military	ETCAF	26.94167°N 120.07750°E	11/29: 2,410 m		84
Xijiao Air Base	西郊	Beijing Xijiao Airport	N/A	ZBBB	Military	PLAAF HQ	39.95861°N 116.25667°E	18/36: 2,230 m		85
Xingning Air Base	兴宁	Xingning Airport	XIN	ZGXN	Dual	STCAF	24.14977°N 115.75710°E	15/33: 2,600 m		86
Xinzhou Air Base	新舟	Zunyi Airport, Zunyi Xinzhou Airport	ZYI	ZUZY	Dual	WTCAF	27.81111°N 107.24611°E	18/36: 2,800 m		87
Yancheng Air Base	盐城	Yancheng Nanyang International Airport	YNZ	ZSYN	Dual	PLAAF HQ	33.42611°N 120.20333°E	04/22: 2,800 m		88
Xingning Air Base	軍用	Xingning Airport, Yangtang Li Air Base	XIN	ZGXN	Dual	STCAF	24.14972°N 115.75722°E	15/33: 2,600 m		89
Yaohu Air Base	瑶湖	Nanchang Yaohu Airport	N/A	CN-0162	Military	ETCAF	28.70167°N 116.10722°E	03/21: 3,600 m		90
Yiwu Air Base	义乌	Yiwu Airport	YIW	ZSYW	Dual	ETCAF	29.34472°N 120.03222°E	02/20: 3,000 m		91
Zhangjiakou Air Base	张家口	Zhangjiakou Ningyuan Airport	ZQZ	ZBZJ	Dual	CTCAF	40.73944°N 114.93167°E	12/30: 2,500 m		92
Zhangye Southeast Air Base	张掖	Zhangye Ganzhou Airport	ZYZ	ZLZY	Dual	WTCAF	38.80222°N 100.67500°E	11/29: 3,000 m		93
