= Southern Theater Command Air Force =

Air forces of the People's Liberation Army's Southern Theater Command

- 中国人民解放军南部战区空军
- Emblem of the People's Liberation Army Air Force
- Active: 2016–present
- Country: China
- Allegiance: Chinese Communist Party
- Branch: People's Liberation Army Air Force
- Garrison/HQ: Guangzhou, Guangdong
- Mottos: 为人民服务 "Serve the People"
- Colors: Red and Blue
- March: March of the Chinese Air Force

Commanders
- Commander: Lieutenant General Qiao Xiangji
- Political Commissar: Lieutenant General Xu Liqian

Southern Theater Command Air Force
- Southern Theater Command
- Simplified Chinese: 中国人民解放军南部战区空军
- Traditional Chinese: 中國人民解放軍南部戰區空軍
Transcriptions
Standard Mandarin
- Hanyu Pinyin: Zhōngguó Rénmín Jiěfàngjūn Nánbù Zhànqū Kōngjūn

The Southern Theater Command Air Force is the air force under the Southern Theater Command. Its headquarters is in Guangzhou, Guangdong. The current commander is Qiao Xiangji and the current political commissar is Xu Liqian.

== History ==
On 1 February 2016, the founding meeting of the Southern Theater Command Air Force was held at the August First Building in Beijing, China.

== Functional department ==
- General Staff
- Political Work Department
- Logistics Department
- Disciplinary Inspection Committee

== Direct units ==
- PLA Air Force Liuzhou Aviation Equipment Training Base

== Main Bases ==
- PLA Air Force Nanning Base
- PLA Air Force Kunming Base

=== Air Units ===
==== Fighter Units ====
Unit Name	Homebase	Serials Range	Aircraft Type	Comments
4th Air Brigade	Guangdong, Foshan, Foshan Air Base	61X5X	J-20A	Nanning Base
5th Air Brigade	Guangxi, Guilin, Qifengling Air Base	61X6X	J-20A	Nanning Base
6th Air Brigade	Guangdong, Zhanjiang, Suixi Airbase	61X7X	J-16、Su-35	Nanning Base
26th Air Brigade	Guangdong, Huizhou, Huizhou Airbase	63X7X	J-16	Nanning Base
54th Air Brigade	Hunan, Changsha, Tianxin Airbase	66X5X	Su-30MKK	Nanning Base
124th Air Brigade	Guangxi, Baise, Tianyang Airbase	73X5X	J-10C	Nanning Base
125th Air Brigade	Guangxi, Nanning, Wushu Airbase	73X6X	J-16	Nanning Base
126th Air Brigade	Guangxi, Liuzhou, Bailian Airbase	73X7X	JH-7A	Nanning Base
130th Air Brigade	Yunnan, Honghe, Mengzi Airbase	74X1X	J-10C	Kunming Base
131st Air Brigade	Yunnan Qujing, Luliang Airbase	74X2X	J-20A	Kunming Base
132nd Air Brigade	Yunnan, Dali, Yunnanyi Airbase	74X3X	J-7E	Kunming Base
808th Air Brigade	Hainan, Lin'gao	8XX8X	J-11BH	Formerly Naval Aviation 8th Brigade
809th Air Brigade	Hainan, Ledong	8XX9X	JH-7A	Formerly Naval Aviation 9th Brigade

==== Bomber Units ====
Unit Name	Homebase	Serials Range	Aircraft Type	Comments
22nd Air Brigade	Hunan, Shaoyang, Shaodong	1XX9X	H-6K	8th Bomber Division
23rd Air Brigade	Hunan, Hengyang, Leiyang	1XX9X	H-6U	8th Bomber Division
24th Air Regiment	Hunan, Hengyang, Leiyang	1XX9X	H-6K	8th Bomber Division

==== Special Mission Units ====
Unit Name	Homebase	Serials Range	Aircraft Type	Comments
58th Air Regiment	Guizhou, Guiyang	3XX1X	Y-8G，运侦-8	20th Special Mission Division
59th Air Regiment	Guizhou, Zunyi	3XX1X	Y-8G，运侦-8	20th Special Mission Division
60th Air Regiment	Guizhou, Guiyang	3XX1X	Y-9G，Y-9X，Y-8X	20th Special Mission Division

== List of leaders ==
=== Commanders ===
English name	Chinese name	Took office	Left office	Notes
Xu Anxiang	徐安祥	February 2016	December 2017	
Zhou Li	周利	December 2017	March 2023	
Qiao Xiangji	乔相记	March 2023		

=== Political commissars ===
English name	Chinese name	Took office	Left office	Notes
An Zhaoqing	安兆庆	February 2016	January 2017	
Xu Xisheng	徐西盛	2017	2023	
Xu Liqian	徐立谦	2023		

=== Chiefs of staff ===
English name	Chinese name	Took office	Left office	Notes
Zheng Yuanlin	郑元林	2016	December 2018	
