= Northern Theater Command Air Force =

Air forces of the People's Liberation Army's Northern Theater Command

- 中国人民解放军北部战区空军
- Emblem of the People's Liberation Army Air Force
- Active: 2016–present
- Country: China
- Allegiance: Chinese Communist Party
- Branch: People's Liberation Army Air Force
- Garrison/HQ: Shenyang, Liaoning
- Mottos: 为人民服务 "Serve the People"
- Colors: Red and Blue
- March: March of the Chinese Air Force

Commanders
- Commander: Lieutenant General Liu Wenqi
- Political Commissar: Lieutenant General Cai Lishan

Northern Theater Command Air Force
- Northern Theater Command
- Simplified Chinese: 中国人民解放军北部战区空军
- Traditional Chinese: 中國人民解放軍北部戰區空軍
Transcriptions
Standard Mandarin
- Hanyu Pinyin: Zhōngguó Rénmín Jiěfàngjūn Běibù Zhànqū Kōngjūn

The Northern Theater Command Air Force is the air force under the Northern Theater Command. Its headquarters is in Shenyang, Liaoning. The current commander is Liu Wenqi and the current political commissar is Cai Lishan.

== History ==
On 1 February 2016, the founding meeting of the Northern Theater Command Air Force was held at the August First Building in Beijing, China.

== Functional department ==
- General Staff
- Political Work Department
- Logistics Department
- Disciplinary Inspection Committee

== Direct units ==
- Shenyang Aviation Equipment Training Base
- Northern Theater Command Air Force Hospital

== Main Bases ==
- PLA Air Force Dalian Base
- PLA Air Force Jinan Base

== Air Units ==
=== Fighter Units ===
Unit Name	Homebase	Serials Range	Aircraft Type	Comments
1st Air Brigade	Liaoning, Anshan, Teng'ao Airbase	61X2X	J-20A	Dalian Base
2nd Air Brigade	Inner Mongolia, Chifeng, Yulong Airbase	61X3X	J-10C, J-20	Dalian Base
3rd Air Brigade	Heilongjiang, Qiqihar, Sanjiazi Airbase	61X4X	J-16	Dalian Base
31st Air Brigade	Jilin, Siping, Siping Airbase	64X2X	JH-7A	Dalian Base
61st Air Brigade	Jilin, Yanbian, Yanji, Chaoyangchuan Airbase	67X2X	J-10B	Dalian Base
63rd Air Brigade	Heilongjiang, Mudanjiang, Hailang Airbase	67X2X	J-7H	Dalian Base
88th Air Brigade	Liaoning, Dandong, Langtou Airbase	69X9X	J-7E	Dalian Base
89th Air Brigade	Liaoning, Dalian, Pulandian Airbase	70X0X	J-11B	Dalian Base
15th Air Brigade	Shandong, Weifang, Nanyuan Airbase	62X6X	J-16	Jinan Base
34th Air Brigade	Shandong, Weihai, Daishuipo Airbase	64X5X	J-10C	Jinan Base
44th Air Brigade	Inner Mongolia, Hohhot, Bikeqi Airbase	65X5X	J-7G	Jinan Base
55th Air Brigade	Shandong, Jining, Qufu Airbase	66X6X	J-20A	Jinan Base
805th Air Brigade	Shandong, Yantai	8XX5X	JH-7A	Formerly Naval Aviation 6th Brigade
807th Air Brigade	Liaoning, Suizhong	8XX7X	J-11B、JH-7A、JL-9、JL-10	Formerly Naval Aviation 7th Brigade

=== Special Mission Units ===
Unit Name	Homebase	Serials Range	Aircraft Type	Comments
46th Air Regiment	Liaoning, Shenyang	2XX7X	JZ-8F	16th Special Missions Air Division
47th Air Regiment	Liaoning, Shenyang	2XX7X	KJ-500、Y-8G，运侦-8	16th Special Missions Air Division
48th Air Regiment	Jilin, Shuangliao	2XX7X	WZ-7	16th Special Missions Air Division

== List of leaders ==
=== Commanders ===
English name	Chinese name	Took office	Left office	Notes
Ding Laihang	丁来杭	2016	2017	
Xu Xueqiang	许学强	2017	August 2021	
Liu Wenqi	刘文起	August 2021		

=== Political commissars ===
English name	Chinese name	Took office	Left office	Notes
Bai Wenqi	白文奇	2016	December 2018	
Cai Lishan	蔡立山	April 2019		

=== Chiefs of staff ===
English name	Chinese name	Took office	Left office	Notes
Zhan Yongsheng	战永胜	2016		
