= 1st Fighter Brigade =

People's Liberation Army Air Force unit

- Active: 19 June 1950–present
- Country: China
- Allegiance: Chinese Communist Party
- Branch: People's Liberation Army Air Force
- Type: Fighter Brigade
- Part of: Northern Theater Command Air Force
- Garrison/HQ: Anshan Teng'ao Airport Chifeng Yulong Airport Xianyang
- Nicknames: 空一师 (pinyin: Kōng yī shuaī); 93056 (MUCD)
- Engagements: Korean War

Commanders
- Current commander: Li Ling (Chinese: 李凌)

Aircraft flown
- Fighter: Chengdu J-20

The 1st Fighter Brigade (1st BDE, Chinese: 第1航空旅; pinyin: Dì 1 hángkōng lǚ), sometimes called 1st Air Brigade, previously 1st Fighter Division, is a fighter aircraft unit of the Chinese People's Liberation Army Air Force (PLAAF) based at Xianyang in Shaanxi province. Part of the Northern Theater Command Air Force, the brigade was originally established as the first division level formation of the PLAAF, established 19 June 1950. In the Korean War the unit shot down 92 airplanes. It was the first in PLAAF history to fight in air combat, provide close air support, perform night bombing operations and more. It is also the only air brigade of the People's Liberation Army Air Force to participate in five Chinese national day parades (1st, 10th, 35th, 50th and 60th national day parades). The unit's MUCD is 93056.

== History ==
=== 4th Mixed Brigade ===
The 1st Fighter Aviation Mixed Brigade originates from the 4th Mixed Brigade of the People's Liberation Army Air Force. In 1950, Commander of the Air Force Liu Yalou telegraphed Political Commissar of the Second Aviation School Li Shian and both agreed to form the first aviation unit. Fang Qiang will become brigadier-general while Li Shian will be the political commissar. While arranging the name of the Mixed Brigade, Liu Yalou decided on the name 4th Brigade as he claimed that the name "First Brigade" would entice arrogance within the unit. The brigade was decided to be reformed into the 4th Mixed Brigade by the Central Military Commission during 19 June 1950 in Nanjing Dajiaochang Airport. This is to counter the bombing of Shanghai and various other cities by the Republic of China Air Force and to prepare for the invasion of Taiwan in the future.

As the first air brigade of the People's Liberation Army, its members were mostly graduates of the PLA Air Force Aviation University. The aircraft of the brigade includes fighter aircraft, bombers and attack aircraft. The officer corps were arranged in the style of the Third Field Army. The brigade concentrated all the air power of the People's Republic of China and thus included of many types of aircraft. The brigade was split into four regiments, which are the 10th Regiment, 11th Regiment, 12th Regiment and 13th Regiment, which all had differing numbers of airplanes and airplane types.

Numbers of planes in the 4th Mixed Brigade by type
Regiment	Lavochkin La-9	Yakovlev Yak-17	Mikoyan-Gurevich MiG-15	Lavochkin La-11	Tupolev Tu-2	Ilyushin Il-10	Total
10th Regiment	3	4	38	-	-	-	45
11th Regiment	4	-	-	39	-	-	43
12th Regiment	-	-	-	-	39	-	39
13th Regiment	-	-	-	-	-	28	28

=== 4th Division ===
The 4th Mixed Brigade was moved to Shanghai on 8 August 1950 and was undergoing patrols of airspace near Shanghai by 19 October in the same year. Under the orders of Liu Yalou, the brigade was relocated to Liaoyang by brigadier-general Fang Ziyi in preparation of the Korean War. The brigade was joined up with the Third Division (currently: 3rd Fighter Aviation Division) of the People's Liberation Army Air Force and Soviet MiG fighter equipment. The 4th Mixed Brigade was reorganized and renamed into the 4th Division. The 4th Division was split into two regiments, 10th and 12th regiments. Each regiment comprised three squadrons, each with 10 aircraft. The entire division included 60 Mikoyan-Gurevich MiG-15s, two Yakovlev Yak-12s and one Guard battalion with a total of 1983 personnel.

The 4th Division was sent off personally by Generals Zhu De and Liu Yalou on 30 November 1950. An order from the People's Liberation Army Air Force to rotate squadrons into Dandong Langtou Airport for providing air support was received on 4 December 1950. The 10th Regiment was the first to be deployed to Dandong Langtou Airport. Li Han was the first Chinese pilot credited with shooting down a U.S. aircraft. He would later lead another attack which saw no Chinese losses and one American casualty. 10th Regiment returned to Liaoyang to recover on 3 March 1951. The 12th Regiment was assigned to combat roles and deployed in July 1951 but delivered subpar combat performance. Pilot Zhao Zhichai being ambushed by American forces and shot down, navigation errors, mid-air collisions between friendly aircraft and the death of regimental commander Zhao Dahai led to the division's temporary relief from combat missions.

On 12 September 1951, the division resumed operations which was its third deployment. It engaged in battles eight times in total and resulted in 26 American aircraft being shot down and 8 damaged American aircraft. However, the 4th Division also faced losses with 14 MiG-15s shot down and 6 damaged. The 3rd Division took over combat missions in Dandong Langtou Airport and the 4th Division was returned to base. The 4th Division participated in an award ceremony later on, Hua Longyi was awarded a Special Class Meritorious while Zou Yan and five others were awarded First Class Meritorious Service. The division reentered the Korean War on 16 January 1952 as their fourth deployment. Zhang Jihui and his wingman Dan Zhiyu fought and won against an American F-86 Sabre led by flying ace George Andrew Davis Jr. The division fought 17 battles, shot down 17 and damaged 6 American aircraft for the duration of its deployment. It was recalled back to Liaoyang in June 1952 to receive upgrades and by the end of the year all the MiG-15s were fully upgraded into MiG-15bis. The 4th Division was deployed for the fifth time on 15 March 1953 to Dagushan Airport. It took part in 29 battles, shot down 24 F-86, 1 Lockheed F-94 Starfire and damaged 3 F-86. Due to the signing of the Korean Armistice Agreement on 7 July 1953, the 4th Division was ordered to stop all combat operations and returned to its base in Liaoyang.

During the Korean War, the 4th Division was tasked with protecting the supply chains and key locations of the People's Volunteer Army. Its aircraft took off in total of 4058 times, fought in 914 air engagements with 43 of its pilots successfully downing enemy aircraft. It has 64 shot down enemy aircraft, 24 damaged enemy aircraft in total with the losses of 55 aircraft and 25 damaged aircraft. 1,424 men of the division has been awarded for their service.

=== 1st Division ===
After the end of the Korean War, the 4th Division was decided to be renamed into 1st Division by the party committee of the People's Liberation Army Air Force. The 10th Regiment, 11th Regiment (formed in 1954) and the 12th Regiment under the 1st Division were also renamed into 1st Regiment, 2nd Regiment, 3rd Regiments respectively. 46 wings of Mikoyan-Gurevich MiG-19 aircraft were imported from the Soviet Union to equip the division in October 1958. The division undergone upgrades in Tongzhou District, Beijing. In 1959, the 1st Regiment and 3rd Regiments were re-based to Anshan. The 1st Regiment was temporary reformed into a night flying unit under the direct control of the division leader. It was than shortly changed into a division independent regiment. 1st, 2nd and 3rd Regiments were renamed into 1st, 2nd and 3rd Large Squadron respectively.

On 15 November 1964, 2nd Large Squadron leader Xu Kaitong piloting a Chinese Shenyang J-6 managed to bring down a United States Armed Forces Ryan Model 147 unmanned reconnaissance aircraft in the stratosphere, becoming the first recorded instance of an aircraft being shot down in the stratosphere. While defending the airspace of China, the division damaged 4 enemy airplanes in total.

During 8 August 1968, the 2nd Large Squadron and 3rd Large Squadron was re-based to Chifeng Yulong Airport, the 1st Large Squadron joined up in Chifeng Yulong Airport on 14 September 1968. All of the Large Squadrons were tasked with protecting the airspace surrounding Beijing.

=== 1st Fighter Aviation Division ===
During May 1970, the People's Liberation Army Air Force ordered the 1st Division to be renamed 1st Fighter Aviation Division. The 1st, 2nd, and 3rd Large Squadrons has also been renamed into 1st, 2nd and 3rd Regiments. From 1979 to 1983, the aircraft of the 1st and 3rd Regiments were systematically upgraded into the Chengdu J-7 and Shenyang J-8 respectively. The division was the first unit in the People's Liberation Army Air Force to adapt the Shenyang J-8. The 1st Regiment was being upgraded with the Shenyang J-8B in 1992 while the 2nd Regiment was upgraded with the Chengdu J-7E. Two types of third-generation aircraft were later incorporated into the division. On 3 February 2009, upgrades made to the division (Chengdu J-10, Shenyang J-11/J-11B, Shenyang J-8F) were shown in CCTV-7 Military·Agriculture Channel. The 1st Fighter Aviation Division became the focus of the People's Liberation Army Air Force for upgrades and became one of the most advanced divisions in the People's Liberation Army Air Force.

Headquartered in Xianyang, the division was split into three sub units: first, second and third regiments. Both first and third regiments are stationed in Anshan while the second is stationed in Chifeng.

=== 1st Fighter Brigade ===
In the late 2010s, the 1st Fighter Division was reduced in status to a brigade, in line with a PLA-wide changeover to primarily brigade formations. In 2021, the 1st Brigade transitioned to the Chengdu J-20 stealth fighter. The China Aerospace Studies Institute of the U.S. Air Force identifies these aircraft as tail numbers 61022, 61023, 61026, 61027, 61120, 61121, 61125, 61127, and 61128.
