= 1982 Vickers Viscount hijacking =

1982 aircraft highjacking in China

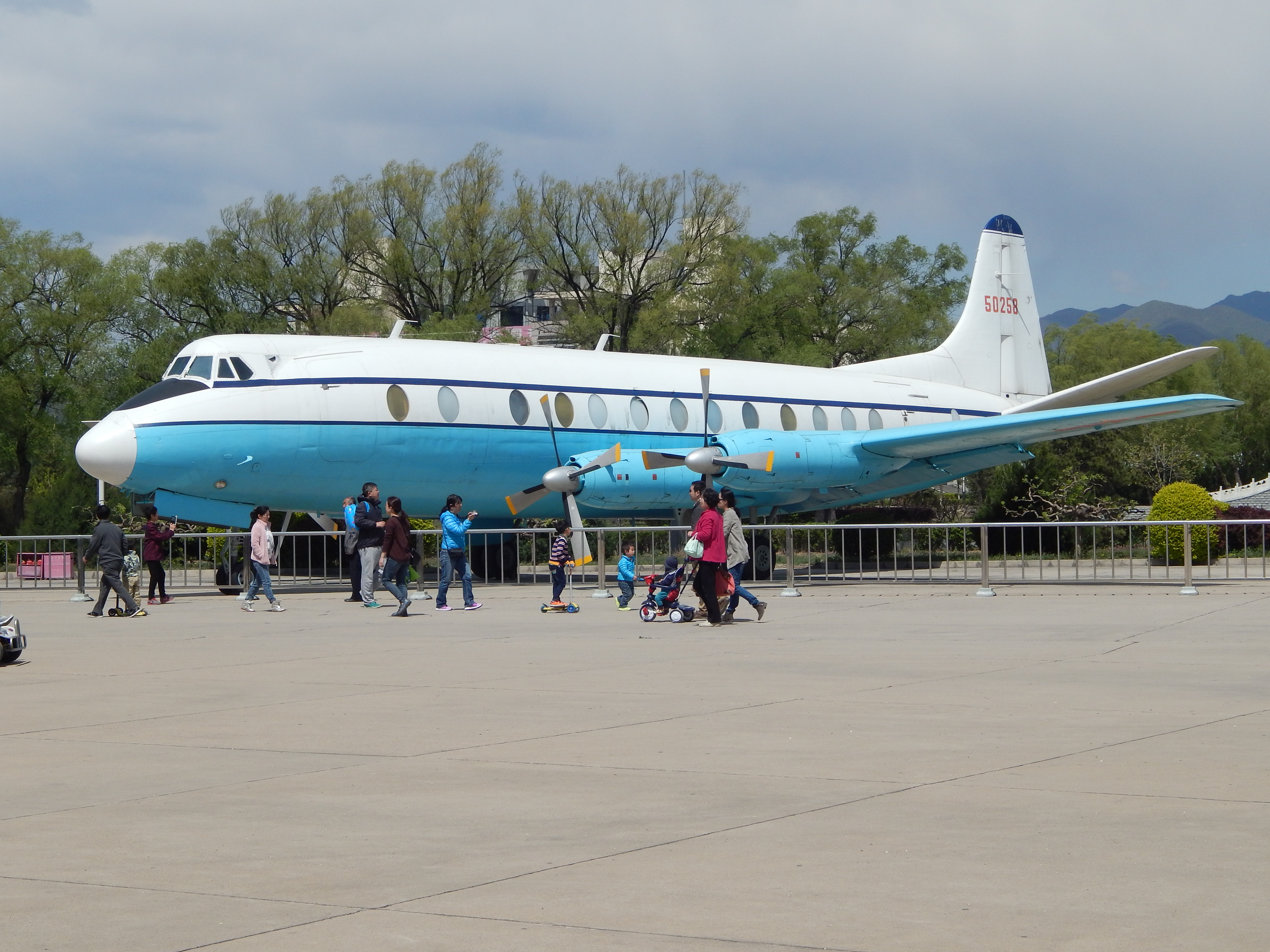
- The incident aircraft on static display at the China Aviation Museum

Hijacking
- Date: 30 July 1982
- Summary: Failed hijacking by Zheng Yanwu to redirect the plane to Taiwan
- Site: Over Wuxi, Jiangsu, China

Aircraft
- Aircraft type: Vickers Viscount
- Operator: People's Liberation Army Air Force
- Registration: 50258
- Flight origin: Shanghai Hongqiao International Airport, Shanghai, China
- Destination: Beijing Xijiao Airport, Beijing, China
- Fatalities: 1 (Hijacker)

The 1982 Vickers Viscount hijacking was an aircraft incident on board a Chinese People's Liberation Army Air Force flight from Shanghai Hongqiao International Airport to Beijing Xijiao Airport which occurred on July 30, 1982. As the aircraft was flying over Wuxi, Zheng Yanwu, a security officer accompanying the delegation, hijacked the Vickers Viscount aircraft numbered 50258. In the end, Zheng Yanwu was killed.

== Background ==
On July 30, 1982, a senior military delegation from Uganda, led by a Ugandan Army Major General visiting China, concluded their visit to Shanghai and took the Viscount aircraft No. 50258 to Beijing to participate in the Chinese People's Liberation Army's 'August 1st' Army Day commemoration activities.

== Hijacking ==
At 9:12 a.m., the airport dispatch centre issued the takeoff command, and the Viscount took off. Twenty minutes after takeoff, Zheng Yanwu rushed into the cockpit, locked the door from the inside, poured a bottle of gasoline on the floor, drew a loaded pistol with his right hand, and took out a lighter with his left. Zheng removed the headset of pilot Lan Dingshou and demanded that the plane change course and head for Taiwan Taoyuan Airport. Co-pilot Zhang Jinghai immediately reported the hijacking to the dispatchers and the rear cabin, but this was discovered by Zheng. In response, Zhang was also forced by Zheng to remove his headset, and all communication between the front cabin, rear cabin, and the ground was completely cut off. While Zheng was regaining his composure, Lan turned off the switch for the right rudder compass, and Zhang operated the plane using the left compass switch, sending the plane on a circuitous course away from Taiwan.

As they continued to fly, Lan Dingshou and Zhang Jinghai quietly turned on the plane's autopilot, switched on the ventilation to let the gasoline evaporate quickly, unbuckled their seatbelts, and used the seat adjustment switch to move their seats to the farthest position in efforts to force the plane to have to land, or to take it back from Zheng. After a half-hour standoff, the plane had begun flying near Taiping Lake, where Lan claimed that they had reached the seaside. When Zheng went to look outside the cabin window, Lan and Zhang took the opportunity to overpower him. During the ensuing struggle, Zheng fired several shots, with Zhang being shot in the right leg, and while Lan's flight suit was pierced by a bullet in an area over his chest and abdomen, he was not injured. The remaining shots hit the cabin equipment and walls. As Zheng and the pilots continued to fight, the cockpit door was broken open, and the plane's navigator, Liu Tiejun, fatally struck Zheng Yanwu with an axe. Eventually, after reestablishing connection with air traffic controllers on the ground, the plane landed at Nanjing Daxiaochang Airport, where, after landing, an ambulance retrievee the wounded Zhang, and a second plane was dispatched to fly the members of the delegation off to Beijing.

== Commendations ==
At the Air Force's celebration ceremony, the crew of the Viscount was awarded the title of 'Hero Crew'; Zhang Jinghai and Lan Dingshou were awarded the title of 'Anti-Hijacking Heroes' and received the First-Class Hero Medal of the Central Military Commission; Liu Tiejun and other crew members were commended and awarded by the Air Force.
