= Beijing Airport =

Beijing Airport may refer to:

- Beijing Capital International Airport (IATA: PEK), a civil International airport in Shunyi, Beijing
- Beijing Daxing International Airport (IATA: PKX), a civil International airport in Daxing, Beijing
- Beijing Nanyuan Airport (IATA: NAY), a military airport in Fengtai, Beijing
- Beijing Xijiao Airport (IATA: N/A), a military airport in Haidian, Beijing
