= Central Theater Command Air Force =

Air forces of the People's Liberation Army's Central Theater Command

- 中国人民解放军中部战区空军
- Emblem of the People's Liberation Army Air Force
- Active: 2016–present
- Country: China
- Allegiance: Chinese Communist Party
- Branch: People's Liberation Army Air Force
- Garrison/HQ: Beijing
- Mottos: 为人民服务 "Serve the People"
- Colors: Red and Blue
- March: March of the Chinese Air Force

Commanders
- Commander: Lieutenant General Vacant
- Political Commissar: Lieutenant General Shang Yaheng

Central Theater Command Air Force
- Central Theater Command
- Simplified Chinese: 中国人民解放军中部战区空军
- Traditional Chinese: 中國人民解放軍中部戰區空軍
Transcriptions
Standard Mandarin
- Hanyu Pinyin: Zhōngguó Rénmín Jiěfàngjūn Zhōngbù Zhànqū Kōngjūn

The Central Theater Command Air Force is the air force under the Central Theater Command. Its headquarters is in Beijing. The current commander is Han Shengyan and the current political commissar is Shang Yaheng.

== History ==
On 1 February 2016, the founding meeting of the Central Theater Command Air Force was held at the August First Building in Beijing, China.

== Functional Departments ==
- General Staff
- Political Work Department
- Logistics Department
- Disciplinary Inspection Committee

== Directly Subordinate Units ==
- Central Theater Command Air Force Training Base
- PLA Air Force Tianjin Aviation Equipment Training Base
- PLA Air Force No. 986 Hospital

== Theater Subordinate Unit ==
- Information and Communication Brigade（Directly under the Theater General Staff office)

== Headquarter Bases ==
Bases, or "HQ Bases" (基地) are Deputy corps-grade units that have jurisdiction over a number of brigades or regiments, each assigned to a home airbase (基站) or aerodrome (机场)

- Datong air force Base
- Wuhan air force Base

=== Air Units ===
==== Fighter Units ====
Division Name	Brigade Name	Home Base	Serials Range	Aircraft Type	Comments
7th Fighter Aviation Division	19th Air Brigade	Hebei, Zhangjiakou, Ningyuan Airbase	63X0X	J-11B, J-20A	Datong Base
	21st Air Brigade	Beijing, Yanqing, Yanqing Airbase	63X2X	J-11B/BG	Datong Base
	43th Air Brigade	Shanxi, Shouzhou, Huairen Airbase	65X4X	J-10A	Datong Base
	70th Air Brigade	Hebei, Tangshan, Zunhua Airbase	68X1X	J-10A	Datong Base
	72nd Air Brigade	Tianjin, Wuqing, Yangcun Airbase	68X3X	J-10C	Datong Base
	52nd Air Brigade	Hubei, Wuhan, Shanpo Airbase	66X3X	J-7G	Wuhan Base
	53rd Air Brigade	Hubei, Xianyang, Laohekou Airbase	66X4X	J-10B	Wuhan Base
	56th Air Brigade	Henan, Zhengzhou, Matougang Airbase	66X7X	J-20A	Wuhan Base

==== Bomber Units ====
Unit Name	Homebase	Unit Numbers	Aircraft Type	Comments
106th Air Brigade	Henan, Nanyang, Neixiang Airbase	55X3X	H-6N	Directly controlled by Theater Command
107th Air Brigade	Shaanxi, Xi'an, Lingtong	4XX7X	H-6H	36th Bomber Division
空108团	Shaanxi, Xianyang, Wugong	4XX7X	H-6K	36th Bomber Division

==== Transport Units ====
Unit Name	Home Base	Serials Range	Aircraft Type	Notes
37th Air Regiment	Henan, Kaifeng	2XX4X	Y-20	13th Transport Division
38th Air Regiment	Hubei, Wuhan	2XX4X	Y-20, YY-20	13th Transport Division
39th Air Regiment	Hubei, Yicheng, Dangyang	2XX4X	Il-76	13th Transport Division
100th Air Regiment	Beijing, Xijiao Air Base	B-40XX	Airbus 319、Boeing 737、CRJ200、Bombardier CRJ700	34th Transport Division
101st Air Regiment	Beijing, Shahe Airbase	B-40XX	EC225、AS332	34th Transport Division
102nd Air Regiment	Beijing, Daxing Airport	B-40XX	Boeing 737	34th Transport Division

==== Special Mission Unit ====
Unit Name	Home Base	Serials Range	Aircraft Type	Comments
Special Mission Regiment	Beijing	55X4X	Tu-154D、Learjet-35A/36A	

==== UAV Unit ====
Unit Name	Home Base	Serials Range	Aircraft Type	Comments
151st Air Brigade	Hebei, Cangzhou		Chengdu GJ-1	

== List of leaders ==
=== Commanders ===
English name	Chinese name	Took office	Left office	Notes
Zhuang Kezhu	庄可柱	January 2016	July 2018	
Han Shengyan	韩胜延	July 2018	December 2025	

=== Political commissars ===
English name	Chinese name	Took office	Left office	Notes
Jiang Qingyou	刘绍亮	January 2016	January 2017	
Guo Puxiao	郭普校	January 2017	December 2019	
Wang Chengnan	王成男	April 2020	2021	
Han Xiaodong	韩晓东	December 2021	April 2024	
Shang Yaheng	商亚恒	May 2024		
