= LZH =

LZH may refer to:

- Classical Chinese (ISO 639: lzh), a written form of Old Chinese
- LHA (file format), a data compression format
- Liuzhou Bailian Airport (IATA code: LZH), an airport in China
