= BFU =

BFU may refer to:

- Free University of Brussels, Belgium
- German Federal Bureau of Aircraft Accident Investigation (Bundesstelle für Flugunfalluntersuchung)
- Aircraft Accident Investigation Bureau (Switzerland) (Büro für Flugunfalluntersuchungen)
- Beijing Forestry University
- Bulgarian Football Union
- Burgas Free University, Bulgaria
- IATA code for Bengbu Airport, China
- Buzzfeed Unsolved, a documentary entertainment web series
