= Xijiao Airport =

Xijiao Airport may refer to:

- Beijing Xijiao Airport, military airport in Beijing
- Manzhouli Xijiao Airport, civil airport serving Manzhouli, Inner Mongolia
