= Anshan Teng'ao Airport =

Airport in Liaoning, China

Anshan Teng'ao Airport 鞍山腾鳌机场
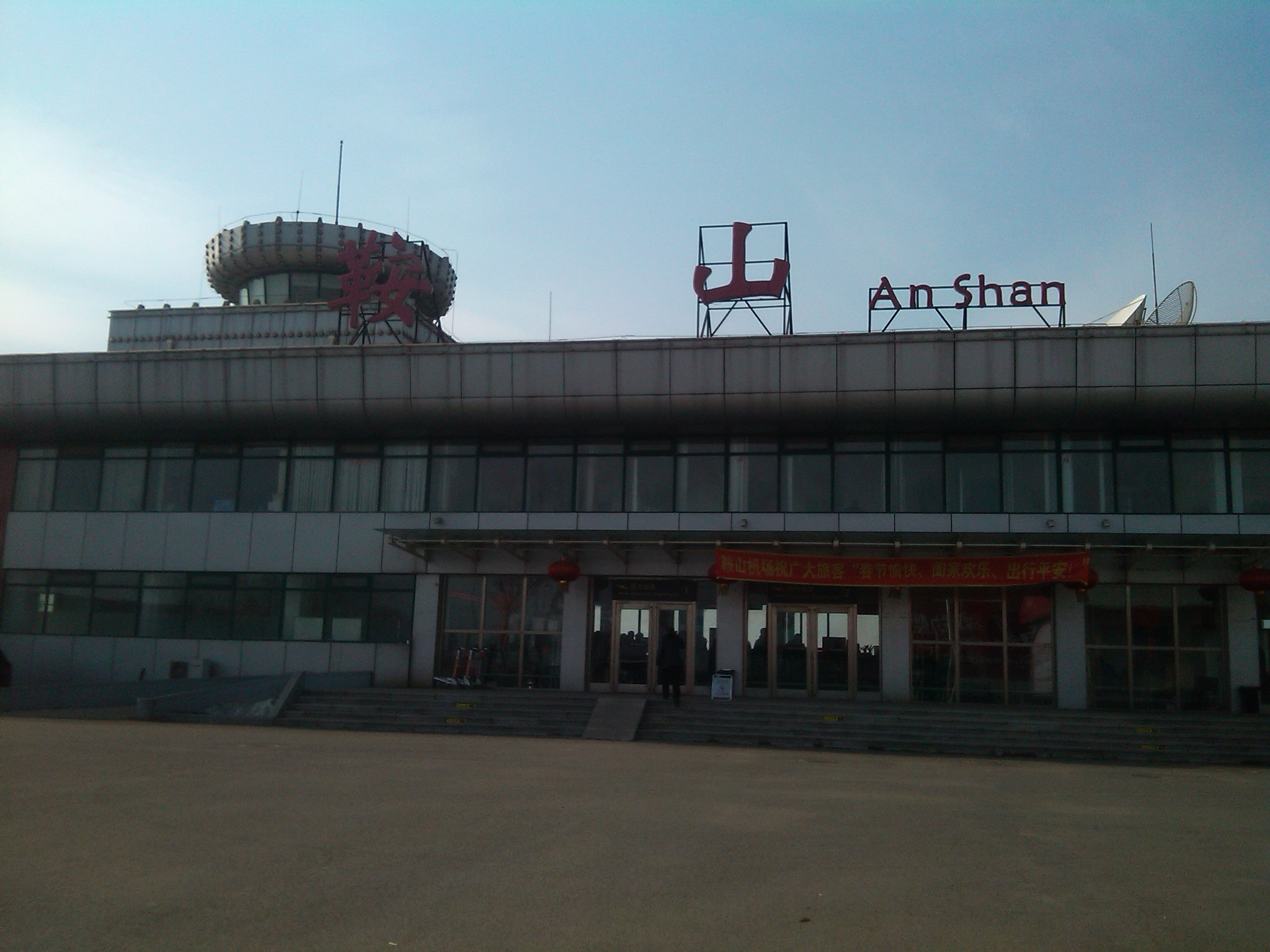
- IATA: AOG; ICAO: ZYAS

Summary
- Airport type: Public / military
- Operator: Liaoning Airport Management Group Co.
- Serves: Anshan, Liaoning
- Location: Teng'ao Town, Qianshan District, Anshan, Liaoning, China
- Coordinates: 41°06′17″N 122°51′21″E
- Website: www.lnairport.com/anshan

Map
- Location of airport in Liaoning

Runways
| Direction | Length | | Surface |
| Direction | m | ft | Surface |
|---|---|---|---|
| 02/20 | 2,600 | 8,530 | Concrete |

Statistics (2021)
- Passengers: 176,907
- Aircraft movements: 2,192

Anshan Teng'ao Airport
- Simplified Chinese: 鞍山腾鳌机场
- Traditional Chinese: 鞍山騰鰲機場
Transcriptions
Standard Mandarin
- Hanyu Pinyin: Ānshān Téng'áo Jīchǎng
Yue: Cantonese
- Jyutping: An1shan1 Teng2ao2 Gei1coeng4

Anshan Teng'ao Airport (Note: Chinese: 鞍山腾鳌机场; pinyin: Ānshān Téng Áo Jīchǎng) (IATA: AOG, ICAO: ZYAS), also called Anshan Air Base is a civil-military airport serving the city of Anshan in Liaoning Province, and a People's Liberation Army Air Force (PLAAF) installation in the Northern Theater Command Air Force. It is located in the town of Teng'ao, 11.8 km southwest of the city center. The airport maintains regular commercial flights to a handful of major Chinese cities, including Beijing, Shanghai, Nanjing, Chengdu, and Guangzhou. The airport also serves as the headquarters of the 1st Fighter Brigade which operates Chengdu J-20 stealth fighters. Commercial flights began in 1987, ceased in 2002, and resumed in April 2011 with a single route to Beijing.

== History ==
During the Korean War, the Soviet Air Forces' 64th Fighter Aviation Corps was stationed at Anshan Air Base, where they actively engaged in the aerial defense of North Korea against the United States Air Force aircraft and attacking USAF aircraft in the area that became known as MiG Alley. The corps consisted of 351st Fighter Aviation Regiment, a night fighter regiment which consisted of MiG-15 and Lavochkin La-11. Due to the low effectiveness of the La-11 in air battles against jet aircraft, the regiment mastered the night fighting capability of the MiG-15, on which it continued combat operations.

== Airlines and destinations ==
| Airlines | Destinations |
|---|---|
| China United Airlines | Beijing–Daxing |
| Shanghai Airlines | Shanghai–Pudong |
| Sichuan Airlines | Chengdu–Tianfu |

== Trivia ==
- Anshan Air Base was visited in March 2007 by Peter Pace, Chairman of the U.S. Joint Chiefs of Staff.
- In Tom Clancy's novel The Bear and the Dragon, Anshan Air Base is heavily damaged by USAF F-117 stealth fighters to neutralize it in preparation for a raid on a nearby ICBM launch site.

== See also ==
- List of airports in China
- List of the busiest airports in China
- List of airbases in the PLAAF
