= Suzhou Guangfu Airport =

Military airport in Suzhou, Jiangsu, China

Suzhou Guangfu Airport 苏州光福机场
- IATA: SZV; ICAO: ZSSZ

Summary
- Airport type: Military
- Owner: People's Liberation Army
- Operator: People's Liberation Army Air Force
- Serves: Suzhou
- Location: Suzhou, Jiangsu, China
- Opened: 20 February 1994
- Passenger services ceased: 29 October 2002
- Built: October 1975
- Coordinates: 31°15′47″N 120°24′2″E

Map
- Location of airport in Jiangsu

Runways
Direction	Length		Surface
Direction	m	ft	Surface
18/36	2,200	7,218	Concrete

Suzhou Guangfu Airport
- Traditional Chinese: 蘇州光福機場
- Simplified Chinese: 苏州光福机场
Transcriptions
Standard Mandarin
- Hanyu Pinyin: Sūzhōu Guāngfú Jīchǎng

Suzhou Guangfu Airport (IATA: SZV, ICAO: ZSSZ), also known as Suzhou West Airfield, is a People's Liberation Army Air Force Base in the city of Suzhou in East China's Jiangsu province, located 22 kilometres (14 mi) southwest of Suzhou City. From February 1994 until 29 October 2002 it briefly served civil flights for Suzhou, with flights to Foshan and Beijing, but is now exclusively used by the military. Suzhou is now mainly served by Wuxi Shuofang Airport, Shanghai Hongqiao International Airport, and Shanghai Pudong International Airport.

== See also ==
- List of airports in China
- List of People's Liberation Army Air Force airbases
