= Western Theater Command Air Force =

Air forces of the People's Liberation Army's Western Theater Command

- 中国人民解放军西部战区空军
- Emblem of the People's Liberation Army Air Force
- Active: 2016–present
- Country: China
- Allegiance: Chinese Communist Party
- Branch: People's Liberation Army Air Force
- Garrison/HQ: Chengdu, Sichuan
- Mottos: 为人民服务 "Serve the People"
- Colors: Red and Blue
- March: March of the Chinese Air Force

Commanders
- Commander: Lieutenant General Zhang Hongbin
- Political Commissar: Lieutenant General Jiang Ping

Western Theater Command Air Force
- Western Theater Command
- Simplified Chinese: 中国人民解放军西部战区空军
- Traditional Chinese: 中國人民解放軍西部戰區空軍
Transcriptions
Standard Mandarin
- Hanyu Pinyin: Zhōngguó Rénmín Jiěfàngjūn Xībù Zhànqū Kōngjūn

The Western Theater Command Air Force is the air force under the Western Theater Command. Its headquarters is in Chengdu, Sichuan. The current commander is Zhang Hongbin and the current political commissar is Jiang Ping.

== History ==
On 1 February 2016, the founding meeting of the Western Theater Command Air Force was held at the August First Building in Beijing, China.

== Functional department ==
- General Staff
- Political Work Department
- Logistics Department
- Disciplinary Inspection Committee

== Direct units ==
- Western Theater Command Air Force Hospital

== Main Bases ==
- PLA Air Force Lhasa Base - Lhasa Gonggar Airport
- PLA Air Force Lanzhou Base - Xianguanying Air Base
- PLA Air Force Ürümqi Base

== Air Units ==
=== Fighter Units ===
Unit Name	Homebase	Serials Range	Aircraft Type	Comments
16th Air Brigade	Ningxia, Yinchuan, Xihuayuan Airbase	62X7X	J-11B	Lanzhou Base
18th Air Brigade	Gansu, Dingxi, Lintao Airbase	62X9X	J-10C	Lanzhou Base
97th Air Brigade	Chongqing, Dazu, Dengyunqiao Airbase	70X8X	J-20A	Lanzhou Base
98th Air Brigade	Chongqing, Baishiyi Airbase	70X9X	J-16	Lanzhou Base
99th Air Brigade	Xinjiang, Hotan, Hotan Airbase	71X0X	J-16	Urumqi Base
109th Air Brigade	Xinjiang, Changji, Changji Airbase	72X0X	J-11A	Ürümqi Base
110th Air Brigade	Xinjiang, Urumqi, Nanshan Airbase	72X1X	JH-7A	Ürümqi Base
111st Air Brigade (MUCD unit 94040)	Xinjiang, Korla, Korla Airbase	72X2X	J-11B J-20A	Ürümqi Base

=== Transport Units ===
Unit Name	Homebase	Serials Range	Aircraft Type	Comments
10th Air Regiment	Sichuan, Qionglai	1XX5X	Y-9	4th Transport Air Division
11th Air Regiment	Sichuan, Luzhou	1XX5X	Y-9	4th Transport Air Division
12th Air Regiment	Sichuan, Qionglai	1XX5X	Y-20	4th Transport Air Division

=== Special Mission Units ===
Unit Name	Homebase	Serials Range	Aircraft Type	Comments
Special Mission Regiment	Qinghai, Golmud	53X5X	KJ-500	

== List of leaders ==
=== Commanders ===
English name	Chinese name	Took office	Left office	Notes
Zhan Houshun	战厚顺	February 2016	April 2020	
Wang Qiang	王强	April 2020	September 2022	
Zhang Hongbin	张洪斌	September 2022		

=== Political commissars ===
English name	Chinese name	Took office	Left office	Notes
Jiang Qingyou	舒清友	February 2016	December 2018	
Jiang Ping	姜平	December 2018		

=== Chiefs of staff ===
English name	Chinese name	Took office	Left office	Notes
Wang Qiang	王强	February 2016	July 2018	
