= Bengbu Airport =

Bengbu Airport 蚌埠机场
- IATA: BFU; ICAO: ZSBB

Summary
- Airport type: Public / Military
- Location: Bengbu, Anhui, China
- Opened: August 1, 2002; 23 years ago
- Coordinates: 32°50′51″N 117°19′13″E

Map
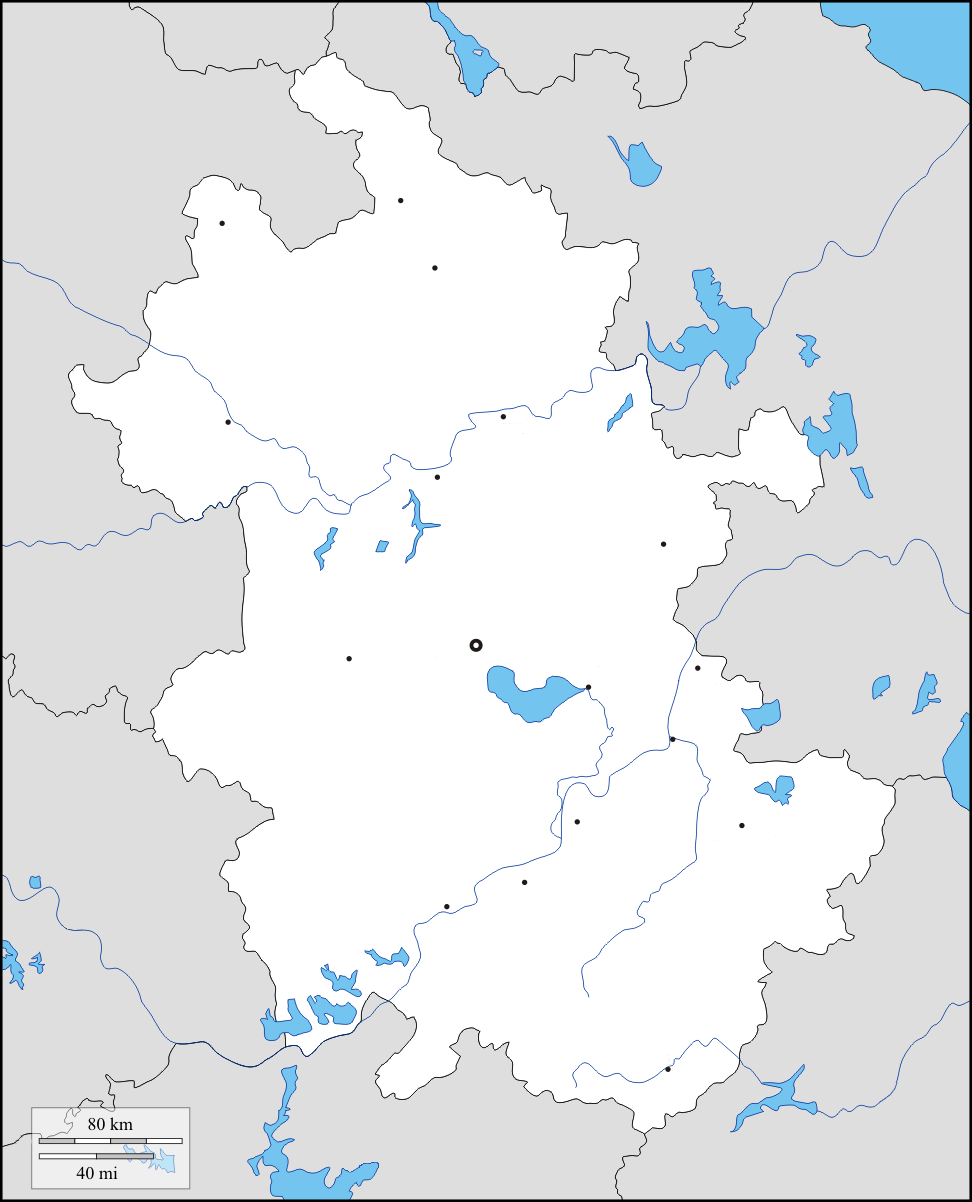

Runways
Direction	Length		Surface
Direction	m	ft	Surface
07/25	2,600	8,530	Concrete

Bengbu Airport
- Simplified Chinese: 蚌埠机场
Transcriptions
Standard Mandarin
- Hanyu Pinyin: Bèngbù Jīchǎng

Bengbu Airport (IATA: BFU, ICAO: ZSBB) is a dual-use (military and civil) airport in Bengbu, Anhui Province, China.

== History ==
Originally, the Bengbu Airport was located very close to Bengbu's urban area (32°56′N 117°22′E). As the city grew, this created an unacceptable situation both for the city's development and for the flight safety. By 1995, the city government decided to try to have the airport relocated. After some years of negotiation, an agreement was reached between the Anhui provincial government and the Nanjing Military Region to construct a new airport elsewhere and to release the old airport site for city development.

In 1997, land acquisition for the new airport started, and in May 1998, 4030 mu (2.69 square km) of land near Renheji (仁和集) village in Qinji Township (秦集乡) was dedicated for the new airport. The site is within 8 km straight-line distance from downtown Bengbu, or 11 km by road.

In August 2002, the new airport was opened for military use. Provisions for future civilian use are made as well, but construction on the civilian-use facilities is yet to start.

== See also ==
- List of airports in China
- List of the busiest airports in China
- List of People's Liberation Army Air Force airbases
