= Qiqihar Sanjiazi Airport =

Airport in Heilongjiang, China

Qiqihar Sanjiazi Airport 齐齐哈尔三家子机场
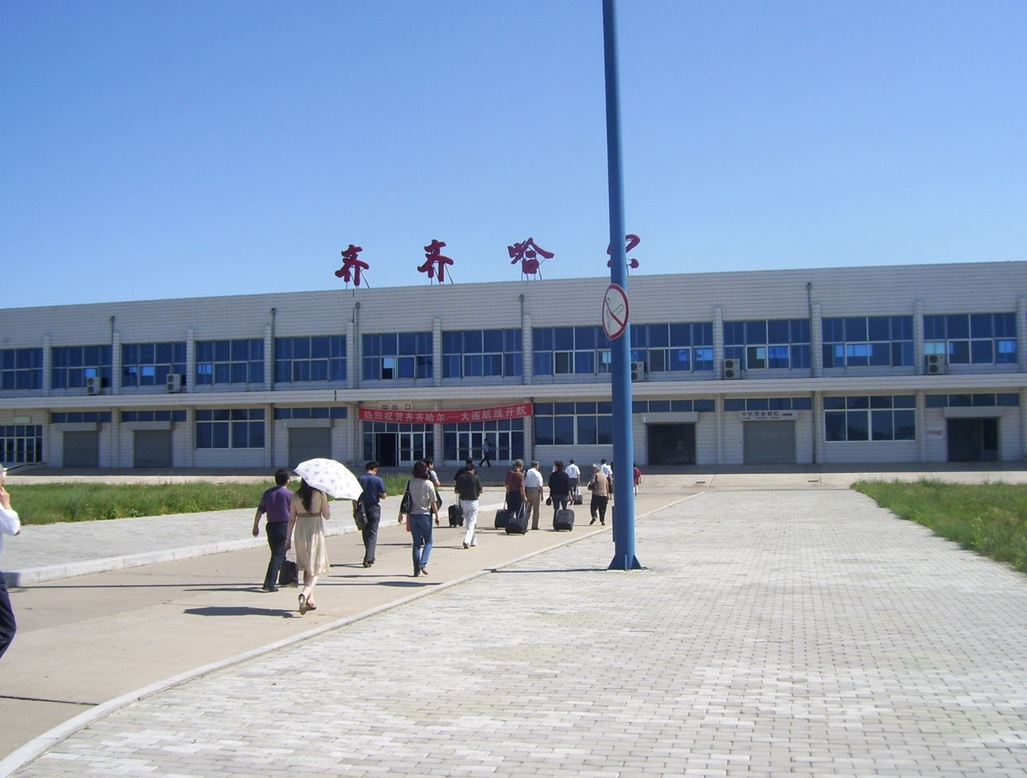
- IATA: NDG; ICAO: ZYQQ

Summary
- Airport type: Public / military
- Serves: Qiqihar, Heilongjiang
- Location: Damin Subdistrict, Longsha District, Qiqihar, Heilongjiang
- Opened: 16 May 1988; 38 years ago
- Elevation AMSL: 145 m (476 ft)
- Coordinates: 47°14′23″N 123°55′05″E

Map
- Location in Heilongjiang NDG/ZYQQ (China)

Runways
Direction	Length		Surface
Direction	m	ft	Surface
17L/35R	3,600	11,811	Concrete
17R/35L	3,000	9,843	Concrete

Statistics (2025)
- Passengers: 591,182 ▲13.1%
- Aircraft movements: 4,294 ▲7.1%
- Cargo (metric tons): 722.7 ▲4.4%
- Source: List of the busiest airports in the People's Republic of China,

Qiqihar Sanjiazi Airport
- Simplified Chinese: 齐齐哈尔三家子机场
- Traditional Chinese: 齊齊哈爾三家子機場
Transcriptions
Standard Mandarin
- Hanyu Pinyin: Qíqíhā'ěr Sānjiāzǐ Jīchǎng

Qiqihar Sanjiazi Airport (IATA: NDG, ICAO: ZYQQ) is a dual-use military and civil airport serving the city of Qiqihar, Heilongjiang Province, China. The airport is located in Damin Town, Longsha District, Qiqihar, 13 kilometers from the city center.

Previously, it is classified as international airport and it serves international flights to Russia, South Korea and North Korea, which is served by other airliners.

== History ==
Qiqihar Sanjiazi Airport was converted from the original Air Force Sanjiazi Airport, and construction began on April 20, 1985. The airport is a joint military and civilian airport with a 4C flight zone rating with a runway of 2,600 meters long and 45 meters wide, and could accommodate the take-off and landing of Boeing 737-800. It officially opened to traffic on May 16, 1988.

Qiqihar Sanjiazi Airport was approved by the State Council in June 1993 as a national first‑class open port, formally permitting international entry and exit. The airport had a 32,300-square-meter apron, an 8,000-square-meter terminal building (including a 4,000-square-meter international inspection hall), and a 2,600 meters long and 45 meters wide runway with Category I Instrument Landing System capability, capable of accommodating larger passenger aircraft such as the McDonnell Douglas MD-82, Boeing 737, and Airbus A320.

On November 11, 2012, the terminal boarding bridges of Qiqihar Sanjiazi Airport were put into use.

On October 16, 2018, the Heilongjiang Regulatory Bureau completed the industry acceptance of three projects at Qiqihar Sanjiazi Airport: the renovation of the navigation lighting system, the addition of sequential flashing lights, and taxiway guidance signs.

On May 28, 2023, the expansion and renovation project of Qiqihar Sanjiazi Airport commenced construction. The project has a total investment of 780 million yuan and is designed to meet the target of 1.2 million passenger throughput, 2,700 tons of cargo and mail throughput, and 12,600 takeoffs and landings by 2030.

On February 17, 2025, a calibration aircraft from the Civil Aviation Flight Inspection Center of China took off from the east runway of Qiqihar Airport to complete the calibration of the newly built east runway. On June 20, 2025, China Southern Airlines flight CZ5685 landed smoothly, marking the completion of the test flight of the east runway of the Qiqihar Airport expansion and renovation project.

At midnight on January 22, 2026, the newly built terminal building of Qiqihar Sanjiazi Airport, with a total investment of 787 million yuan, was officially put into use, and all inbound and outbound flights were simultaneously transferred to the new terminal. As the first feeder hub airport in Northeast China with a 4C-level dual-runway system, the runways are 3,600 meters long and has 9 Class C aircraft stands.

== Airlines and destinations ==
Airlines	Destinations
Air China	Beijing–Capital, Beijing–Daxing
China Eastern Airlines	Dalian, Jinan, Qingdao, Shanghai–Pudong
China Express Airlines	Chengdu–Tianfu, Shijiazhuang, Tianjin
China Southern Airlines	Guangzhou, Shenyang
China United Airlines	Beijing–Daxing
Shandong Airlines	Qingdao
XiamenAir	Fuzhou

Destinations map
Destinations from Qiqihar Sanjiazi Airport

== See also ==
- List of airports in China
- List of the busiest airports in China
- List of People's Liberation Army Air Force airbases
