= Xingning Air Base =

Coordinates: 24°09′00″N 115°45′25.2″E

Xingning Air Base is a military airfield 5 km west of Xingning.
