= Zheng Yuanlin =

Chinese army officer

- 郑元林

Deputy Commander of the PLA Air Force
- Incumbent
- Assumed office December 2018
- Commander: Ding Laihang -> Chang Dingqiu

Chief of Staff of the Southern Theater Command Air Force
- In office January 2016 – December 2018
- Preceded by: New title
- Succeeded by: Vacant

Chief of Staff of the Guangzhou Military Region Air Force
- In office March 2013 – January 2016
- Preceded by: Zhao Pengmin
- Succeeded by: Position abolished

Chief of Staff of the Chengdu Military Region Air Force
- In office October 2012 – March 2013
- Preceded by: Ding Laihang
- Succeeded by: Zhan Yongsheng

Personal details
- Born: April 1962 (age 63–64) Pingdu, Shandong, China
- Party: Chinese Communist Party

Military service
- Allegiance: People's Republic of China
- Branch/service: People's Liberation Army Air Force
- Years of service: 1978–present
- Rank: Lieutenant general
- Commands: PLA Air Force

Chinese name
- Traditional Chinese: 鄭元林
- Simplified Chinese: 郑元林
Transcriptions
Standard Mandarin
- Hanyu Pinyin: Zhèng Yuánlín

Zheng Yuanlin (Chinese: 郑元林; born April 1962) is a lieutenant general (zhongjiang) of the People's Liberation Army (PLA). He has been Deputy Commander of the PLA Air Force (PLAAF) since December 2018. He was promoted to the rank of major general (shaojiang) in July 2010 and lieutenant general (zhongjiang) in December 2019.

== Biography ==
Zheng was born in Pingdu, Shandong in April 1962.

He enlisted in the People's Liberation Army (PLA) in 1978. In January 2010 he was promoted to become Deputy Chief of Staff of the Guangzhou Military Region Air Force. In October 2012 he was promoted again to become Chief of Staff of the Chengdu Military Region Air Force, he remained in that position until March 2013, when he was transferred to Guangzhou and appointed Chief of Staff of the Guangzhou Military Region Air Force. In January 2016, he was appointed Chief of Staff of the newly founded Southern Theater Command Air Force. He rose to become Deputy Commander of the PLA Air Force (PLAAF) in December 2018.

Military offices
Preceded by Ding Laihang	Chief of Staff of the Chengdu Military Region Air Force; 2012–2013	Succeeded by Zhan Yongsheng (战永胜)
Preceded by Zhao Pengmin (赵鹏敏)	Chief of Staff of the Guangzhou Military Region Air Force; 2013–2016	Succeeded by Position abolished
New title	Chief of Staff of the Southern Theater Command Air Force; 2016–2018	Succeeded by Vacant
