= Liuzhou Bailian Airport =

Liuzhou Bailian Airport 柳州白莲机场
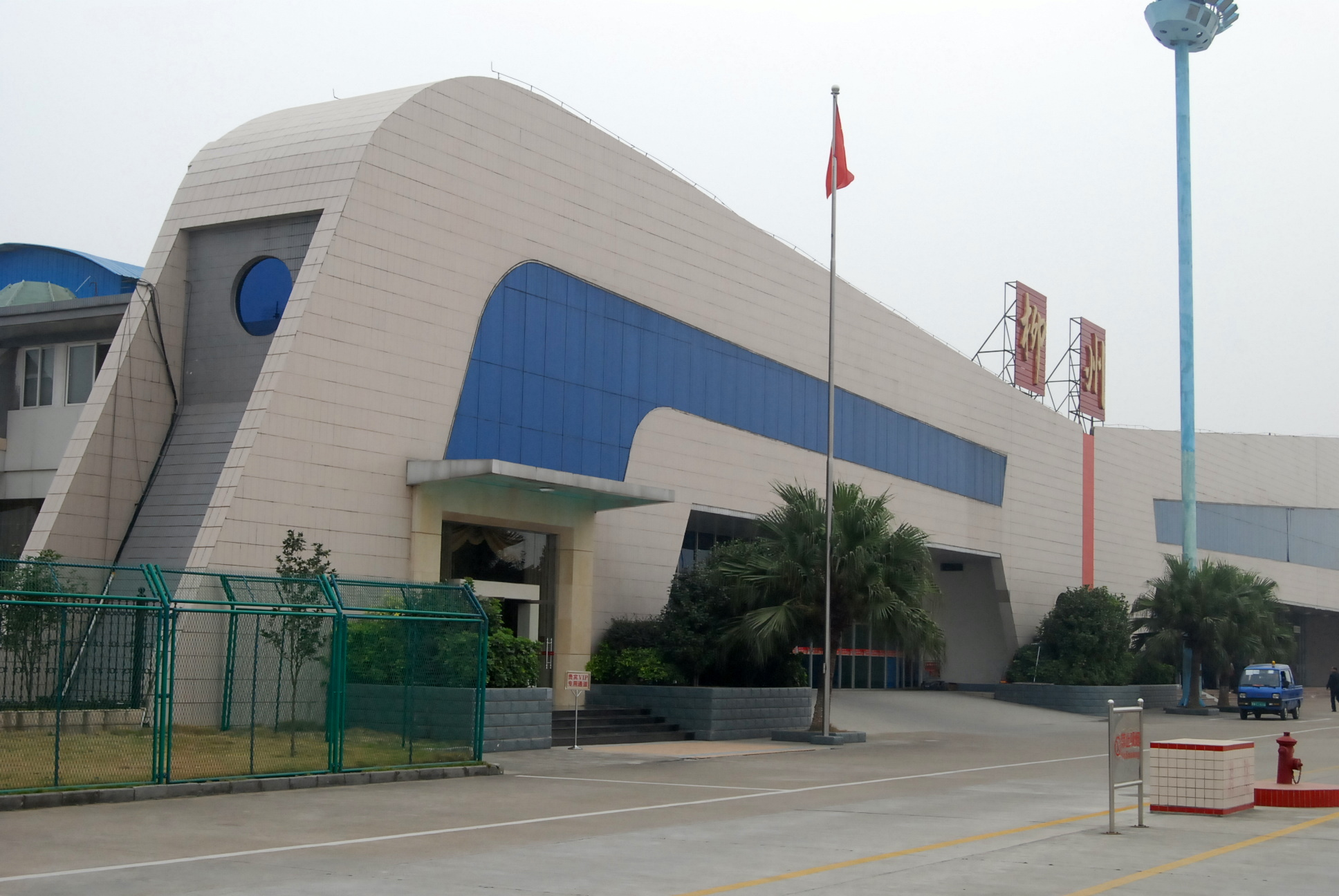
- IATA: LZH; ICAO: ZGZH

Summary
- Airport type: Military/Public
- Serves: Liuzhou, Guangxi
- Elevation AMSL: 90 m (300 ft)
- Coordinates: 24°12′27″N 109°23′28″E

Map
- Location of airport in Guangxi

Runways
Direction	Length		Surface
Direction	m	ft	Surface
16/34	2,500	8,202	Concrete

Statistics (2025)
- Passengers: 1,210,438
- Aircraft movements: 9,420
- Cargo (metric tons): 4,762.2
- Sources: CAAC; Great Circle Mapper

Liuzhou Bailian Airport
- Simplified Chinese: 柳州白莲机场
- Traditional Chinese: 柳州白蓮機場
Transcriptions
Standard Mandarin
- Hanyu Pinyin: Liǔzhōu Báilián Jīchǎng

Liuzhou Bailian Airport (IATA: LZH, ICAO: ZGZH) is a dual-use military and civil airport serving the city of Liuzhou in Guangxi Zhuang Autonomous Region, China.

== History ==
The predecessor of Liuzhou Airport Company was the Civil Aviation Liuzhou Station. It was established in January 1986 in response to the rapid economic development of Liuzhou City. At that time, the old airport (Maohe Airport) was used for flights. With the development of Liuzhou's economy, construction of a new airport started in 1992. The new airport (Bailian Airport) was completed at the end of 1994, and the first flight was launched on December 28, 1994.

In 2011, the Liuzhou Bailian Airport terminal building and supporting facilities expansion project proposal was officially approved by the Guangxi Zhuang Autonomous Region Development and Reform Commission. It is agreed to implement the Liuzhou Bailian Airport terminal building and supporting facilities expansion project. The project legal entity is Liuzhou Urban Investment Construction Development Co., Ltd. The total project investment is estimated to be 630 million yuan. The project is designed in accordance with the goals of 1.26 million tourist throughput and 12,000 tons of cargo and mail throughput in 2020. The main construction content includes: a new terminal building of 22,000 square meters; the construction of road parking lots, viaduct projects, and freight warehouse projects; and the construction of supporting fire protection, power supply, water supply and drainage, oil supply, and auxiliary production and living facilities.

Due to renovation, Liuzhou Bailian Airport suspended flights from October 27, 2013 for five months. It was planned to complete various support preparations such as flight inspection and industry acceptance by the end of March, and would resume flights on March 30. The expansion project of the apron and supporting facilities at Liuzhou Bailian Airport was completed and put into use in May 2014, increasing the number of aircraft parking positions from 4 to 10. The first phase of the terminal building and supporting facilities expansion project officially commenced in 2014, and the entire project was expected to be completed by the end of 2015. The main construction content includes the construction of a new terminal building with an area of 22,000 square meters, with a total investment of 550 million yuan.

Construction of the new terminal building at Liuzhou Airport officially began on April 25, 2015. It is a two-story reinforced concrete frame structure, with the arrival hall on the first floor and the departure hall on the second. The total building area is 22,840 square meters, with an annual passenger throughput of 1.8 million. It features 12 domestic check-in counters, 6 domestic security checkpoints, 8 boarding gates, and includes 6 new boarding bridges. On December 20, 2016, the new terminal of Liuzhou Bailian Airport was officially opened. Between 2015 and 2016, Liuzhou Bailian Airport implemented 39 major projects with a total investment of 15.08 billion yuan. The airport was expected to lead Liuzhou's economy to a new level.

In 2015, Liuzhou City announced that the city had officially launched the site selection process for the relocation of Liuzhou Airport. The Liuzhou Municipal Government had signed a contract with the Shanghai Civil Aviation New Era Airport Design and Research Institute for a site selection report for the Liuzhou Airport relocation project. The relocation project was expected to start in 2017, but the project never took off.

In March 2022, Liuzhou Bailian Airport renewed its transport airport license, and the flight zone level was reduced from 4D to 4C, which means the maximum usable aircraft type is Boeing B737-800.

== Airlines and destinations ==
Airlines	Destinations
Air China	Beijing–Capital
China Eastern Airlines	Shanghai–Pudong, Wuhan
China Express Airlines	Chongqing, Qionghai
Hainan Airlines	Haikou, Xi'an
Jiangxi Air	Nanchang, Zhengzhou
Juneyao Air	Chengdu-Tianfu, Dalian, Nanjing
Ruili Airlines	Fuzhou
Shanghai Airlines	Changchun, Hefei
Sichuan Airlines	Chengdu–Tianfu
Suparna Airlines	Shanghai–Pudong
Tianjin Airlines	Haikou
XiamenAir	Hangzhou

== See also ==
- List of airports in China
- List of the busiest airports in China
- List of People's Liberation Army Air Force airbases
