= Yunnanyi Airport =

Yunnanyi Airport 云南驿机场
- IATA: none; ICAO: none

Summary
- Airport type: Undetermined
- Serves: Xiangyun, China
- Coordinates: 25°25′08″N 100°42′03″E

Map
- Location of Xiangyun Airport

Runways
Direction	Length		Surface
Direction	ft	m	Surface
01/19	7,500	2,272	Unknown

Yunnanyi Airport, formerly known as Xiangyun Airport and during WWII as Beitun Airport, is a military airport in western Xiangyun County, Yunnan province, China.

Throughout the Second World War, there were two airports in Xiangyun County: Yunnanyi Airport (after the nearby town, Yunnanyi) and Beitun Airport (北屯机场). The original Yunnanyi Airport was abandoned after 1949. Beitun Airport stayed in use, and was renamed Xiangyun Airport. Xiangyun Airport was later renamed again to become the current Yunnanyi Airport.

== History ==
After Japan cut off the vital Allied Burma Road logistics line in 1942 during the Second Sino-Japanese War, the airfield was primarily used by transport squadrons operating C-46 Commando and C-47 Skytrain flying from India over "the Hump" until the opening of the Ledo Road in 1945. The transport aircraft unloaded supplies and equipment for the Chinese forces, mainly being food and ammunition. The original Yunnanyi Airport (also known as Yunnani or Siangyun Airfield) was used by the United States Army Air Forces Fourteenth Air Force as part of the China Defensive Campaign beginning in September 1944. In addition, USAAF F-4 (P-38 Lightning) aircraft flew combat reconnaissance missions over Japanese-held areas from the airport in late 1944 and early 1945. The Americans closed their facilities at the airport in July 1945.
