= Dandong Langtou Airport =

Airport in Liaoning, China

Dandong Langtou Airport 丹东浪头机场
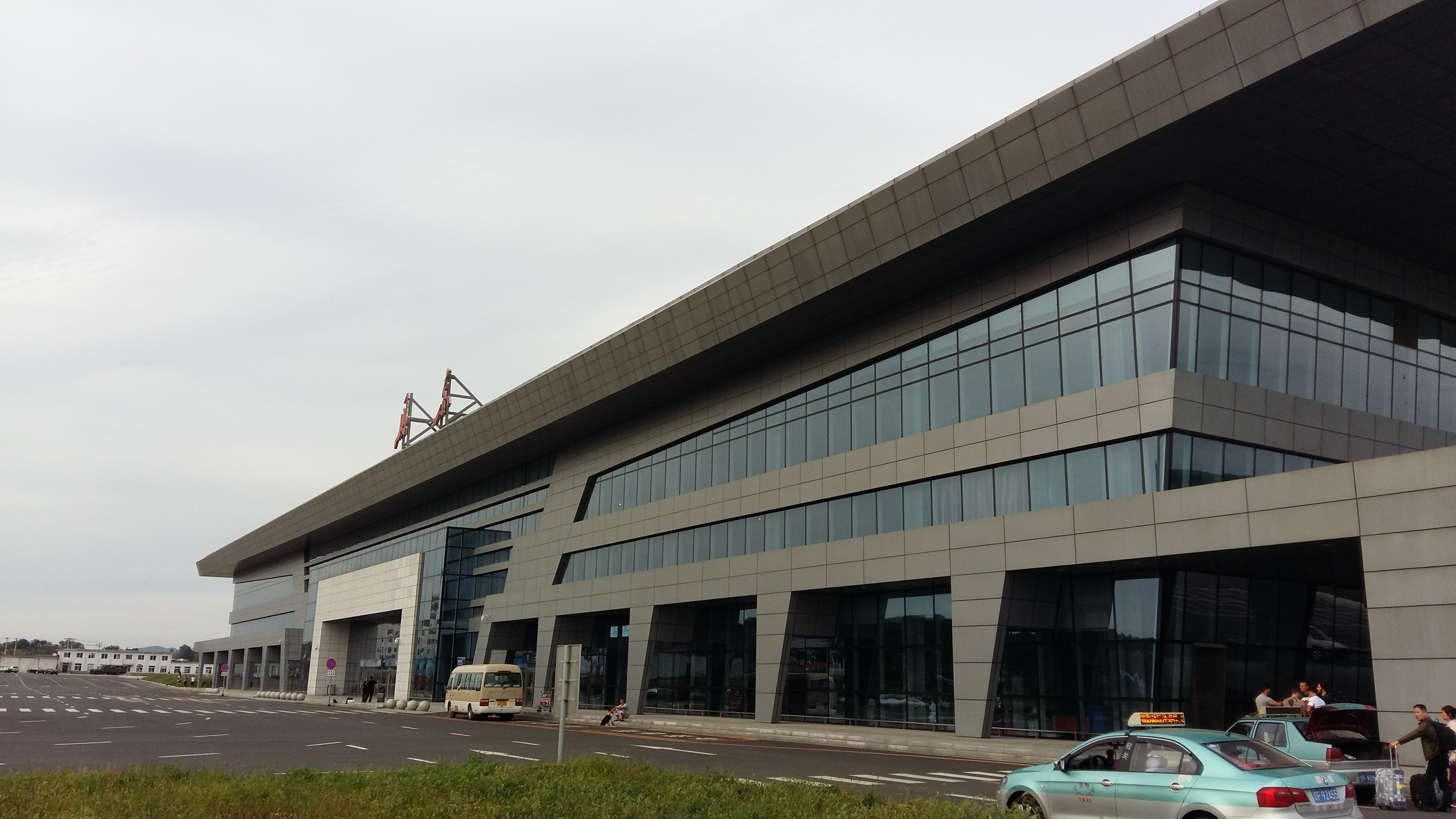
- Airport main building exterior
- IATA: DDG; ICAO: ZYDD

Summary
- Airport type: Public
- Operator: Civil Aviation Administration of China
- Serves: Dandong, Liaoning
- Location: Tangchi, Zhenxing District, Dandong, Liaoning
- Opened: 21 December 1985; 40 years ago 26 April 2026; 6 months ago (Resume operation).
- Elevation AMSL: 9.1 m (30 ft)
- Coordinates: 40.025951°N 124.286906°E
- Website: www.ddcei.gov.cn/english/index.html

Map
- Location of airport in Liaoning

Runways
| Direction | Length | | Surface |
| Direction | m | ft | Surface |
|---|---|---|---|
| 01/19 | 2,600 | 8,530 | Concrete |

Statistics (2021)
- Passengers: 243,068
- Aircraft movements: 2,622
- Cargo (metric tons): 551.6

Dandong Langtou Airport
- Simplified Chinese: 丹东浪头机场
- Traditional Chinese: 丹東浪頭機場
Transcriptions
Standard Mandarin
- Hanyu Pinyin: Dāndōng Làngtou Jīchǎng

Dandong Langtou Airport (IATA: DDG, ICAO: ZYDD) is an airport serving the city of Dandong, Liaoning, China. The airport was closed from 18 May 2025 to 26 April 2026 due to a runway extension project, but has since been open.

== History ==
=== Korean War ===
Antung Airfield was a major base for People's Liberation Army Air Force (PLAAF) and Korean People's Air Force (KPAF) fighters during the Korean War used in the defense of the supply lines across the Yalu River to the North Korean city of Sinuiju and for engaging attacking USAF aircraft in the area that became known as MiG Alley.

In November 1950 reconnaissance photos showed that the previous two gravel runways had been replaced by a 6,000 feet (1,800 m) concrete runway with hard-surfaced taxiways. By March 1951, the PLAAF had at least 75 MiG-15s based at Antung.

=== Civil operations ===
On April 29, 1985, Dandong Langtou Airport officially started civil operations. The first route was Shenyang - Dandong - Dalian route operated by An-24 aircraft. The first renovation was carried out on June 18, 1993. After the expansion, it categorized as Category 4C airport by CAAC.

On April 17, 2014, the 20,000 square metres (220,000 ft^{2}) new terminal was officially opened. It has also expanded an apron of 20,000 square metres (220,000 ft^{2}) and a parking lot and oil depot of 11,000 square metres (120,000 ft^{2}). After the expansion, Dandong Airport increased its capacity from the current 50,000 to 2 million passengers per year.

On 18 May 2025, Dandong Airport has closed for due to the construction of the runway extension project.

Dandong Airport was officially resumed operation on 26 April 2026 with resuming flights between Dandong and Shanghai and Shenzhen is operated by China Southern Airlines. Flights between Dandong and Beijing was resumed on 1 May 2026 is operated by Air China.

== Facilities ==
There is an international waiting hall and two domestic waiting halls, together with 3 VIP lounges. The new terminal has 4 escalators, 5 elevators and a moving walkway. There are more than 1,000 waiting seats in the 3 waiting halls, as well as drinking water areas and mobile phone charging areas. Each departure hall is equipped with a baby care room, as well as an isolation room and emergency rescue hallway. The new terminal is also equipped with two jet bridges. The 20,000-square-metre (220,000 ft^{2}) apron can park 6 narrow-body aircraft at the same time.

== Airlines and destinations ==
| Airlines | Destinations |
|---|---|
| Air China | Beijing-Capital |
| China Southern Airlines | Guangzhou, Shanghai–Pudong, Shenzhen, Yangzhou |
| Shanghai Airlines | Shanghai–Hongqiao |
| Sichuan Airlines | Chengdu–Tianfu |
| Tianjin Airlines | Xi'an, Yantai |

== Gallery ==
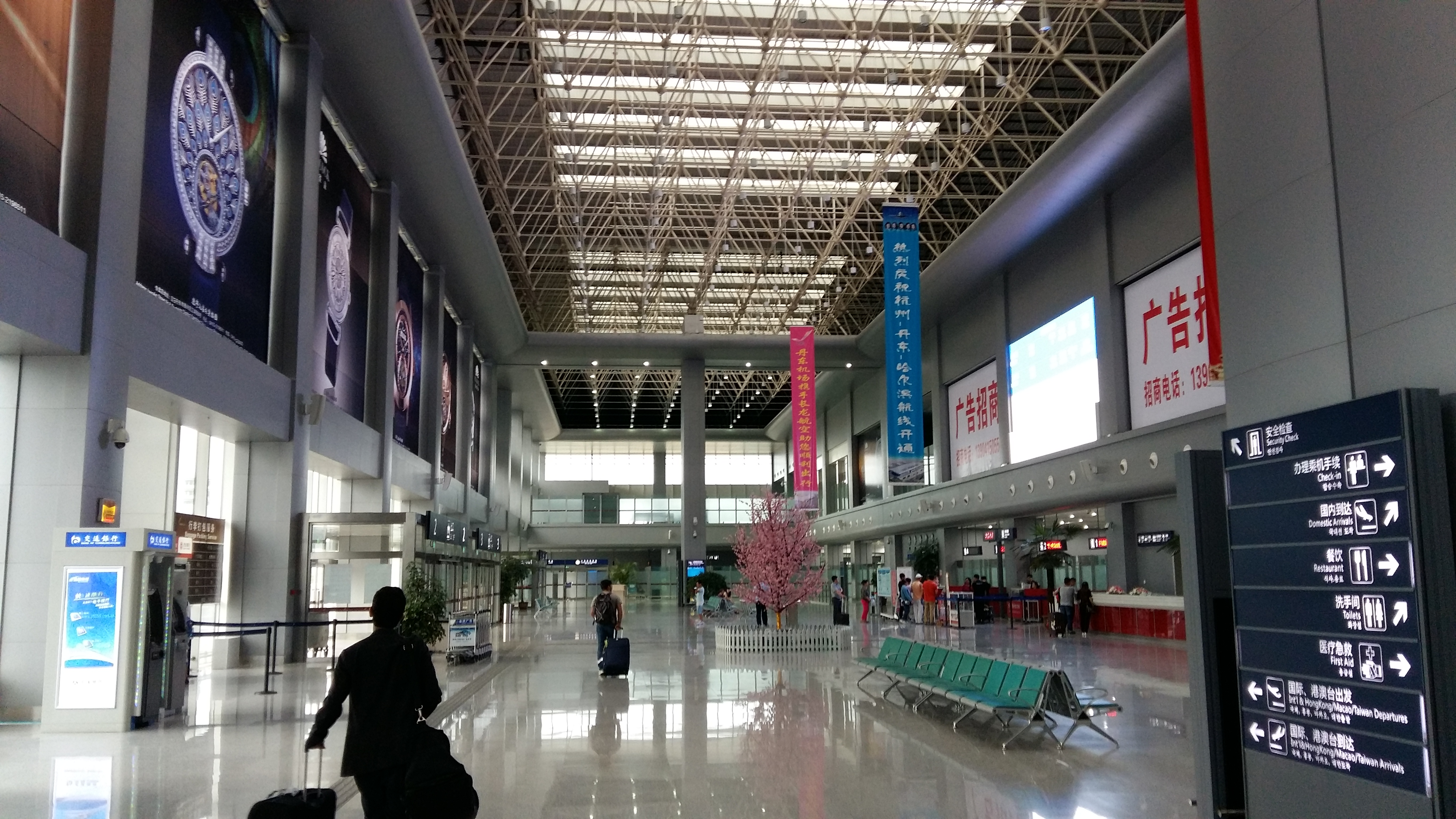
Interior of main arrivals and departures hall in 2015

== See also ==
- List of airports in the People's Republic of China
