= Shenyang J-11 =

Chinese air superiority fighter

J-11 Yinglong
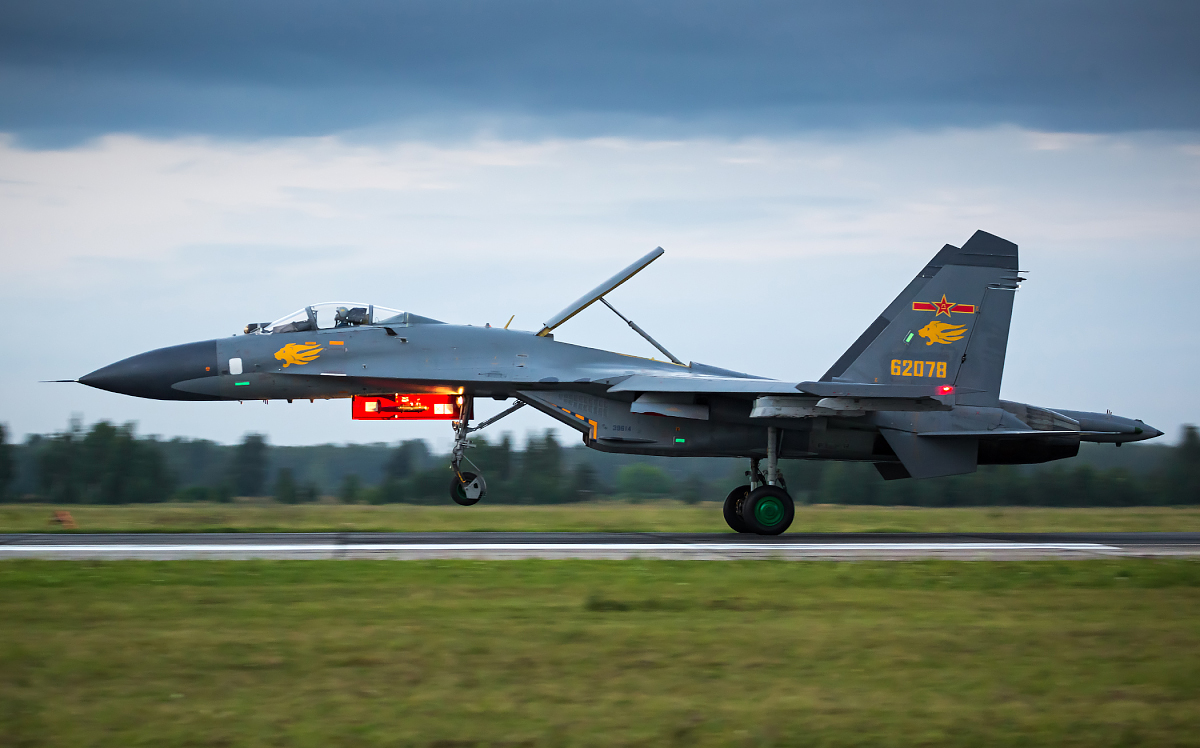
- A PLAAF J-11A

General information
- Type: Air superiority fighter
- National origin: China / Soviet Union
- Manufacturer: Shenyang Aircraft Corporation
- Status: In active service
- Primary user: People's Liberation Army Air Force
- Number built: 440 - 450 (approx.) (as of 2026)

History
- Manufactured: 1998–present
- Introduction date: 1998
- First flight: 1998
- Developed from: Sukhoi Su-27
- Developed into: Shenyang J-15; Shenyang J-16

The Shenyang J-11 (Chinese: 歼-11; NATO reporting name: Flanker-B+/Flanker-L), also known as Yinglong (simplified Chinese: 应龙; traditional Chinese: 應龍; pinyin: yìnglóng; lit. 'Responsive Dragon') is a 4th generation twin-engine jet fighter of the People's Republic of China derived from the Soviet-designed Sukhoi Su-27SK. It is manufactured by the Shenyang Aircraft Corporation (SAC). The aircraft is operated by the People's Liberation Army Air Force (PLAAF) and the People's Liberation Army Naval Air Force (PLANAF).

== Development ==
=== Proposed J-11 ===
Based on experience from the Vietnam War, the PLAAF issued a requirement in 1969 for a short take off and landing (STOL) light fighter to replace the Shenyang J-6 and Nanchang Q-5. The proposal from the Shenyang Aircraft Design Institute and Shenyang Aircraft Factory was designated "J-11"; it resembled a French Dassault Mirage F1 and was powered by a British Rolls-Royce Spey 512 engine. The project was abandoned as no suitable engine could be procured, and the competing Nanchang J-12 was far more advanced.

=== Su-27 purchase ===
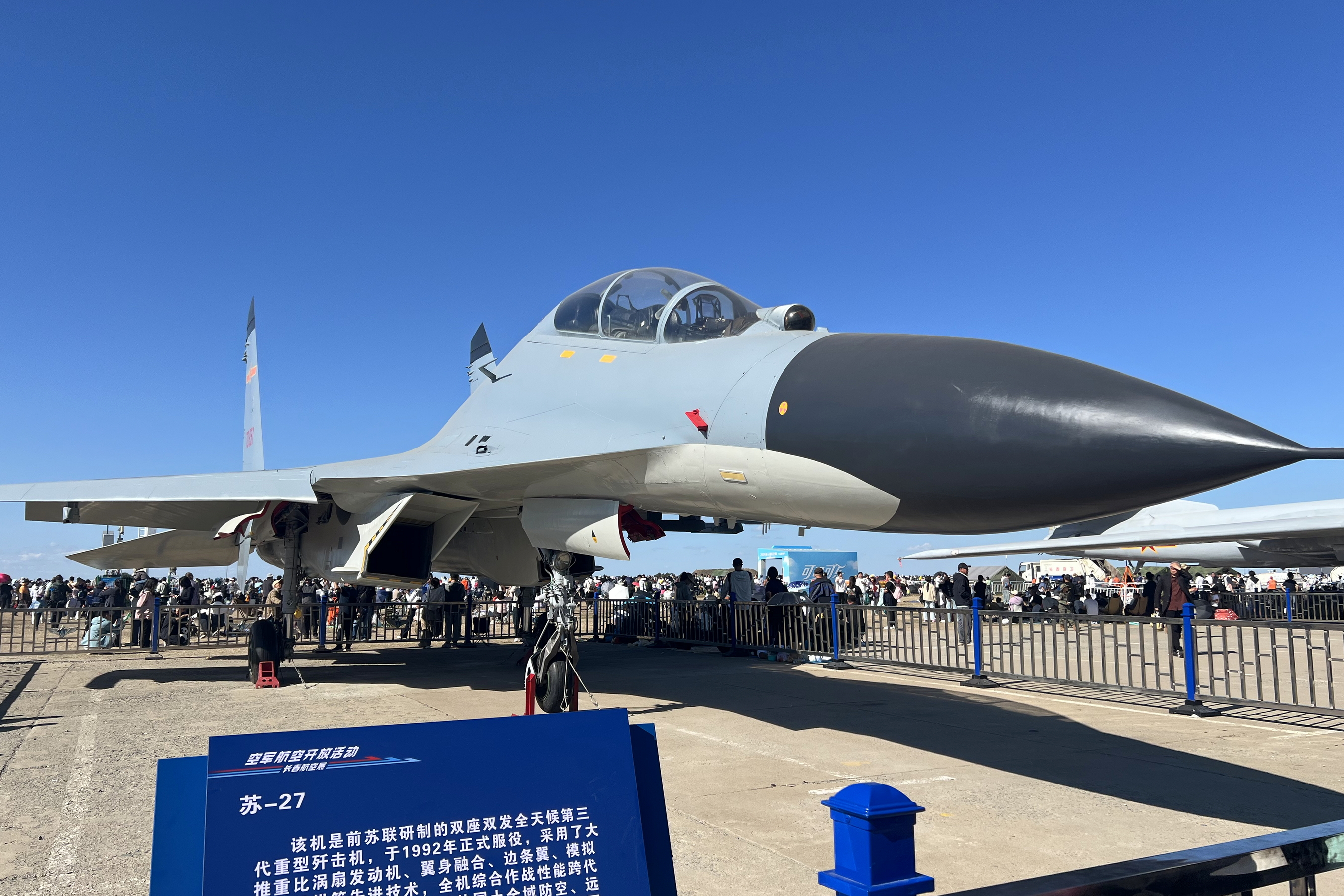
PLAAF Su-27UBK

China was the Su-27's first export customer. China turned to the Soviet Union for weapons following the 1989 Tiananmen Square protests and massacre and the ensuing Western arms embargo. China selected the Su-27 over the Mikoyan MiG-29. Three orders were made in the 1990s, and the deliveries of 36 Su-27SKs and 42 Su-27UBKs started in 1992 and continued into the 2000s.

=== J-11 ===
In 1996, China and Rosoboronexport entered a US$1.2 billion agreement permitting SAC to produce 200 Su-27UBKs under license. Production would start using kits manufactured by Komsomolsk-on-Amur Aircraft Plant (KnAPPO). Subsystems (avionics, radars and engines) would be imported from Russia and not be produced under license. Furthermore, the agreement prohibited China from exporting its production. Production began in 1997. The first two were completed in December 1998 but were poorly assembled and required Russian assistance to rebuild. Five were built by 2000, and another 20 by 2003, by which time production was of high quality and incorporated local airframe parts; Russia did not object to local airframe parts, which allowed KnAPPO to reduce the contents of the kits supplied. Russia resisted China's demands for upgraded avionics, eventually upgrading the obsolescent N001 pulse-Doppler radar with the improved N001V. Production of the J-11A, an "indigenous" variant, began in 2000. By 2006, at least 105 J-11 and J-11As had been produced with improved domestic avionics.

Co-production reportedly ended in 2004 with the development of the J-11B "Flaming Dragon"—a variant with domestic subsystems, which was in violation of the co-production agreement. However, through 2009 China continued to hold licenses to produce Russian aircraft and components, which included previously confidential provisions concerning intellectual property. The original licence did not officially include carrier-capable aircraft (e.g. Sukhoi Su-33) or variants (e.g. Shenyang J-15).

By 2015, J-11s were upgraded with Chinese-made missile approach warning systems (MAWS). Unconfirmed upgrades included improved cockpit displays, and fire control systems for R-77 or PL-10 missiles.

=== J-11B ===
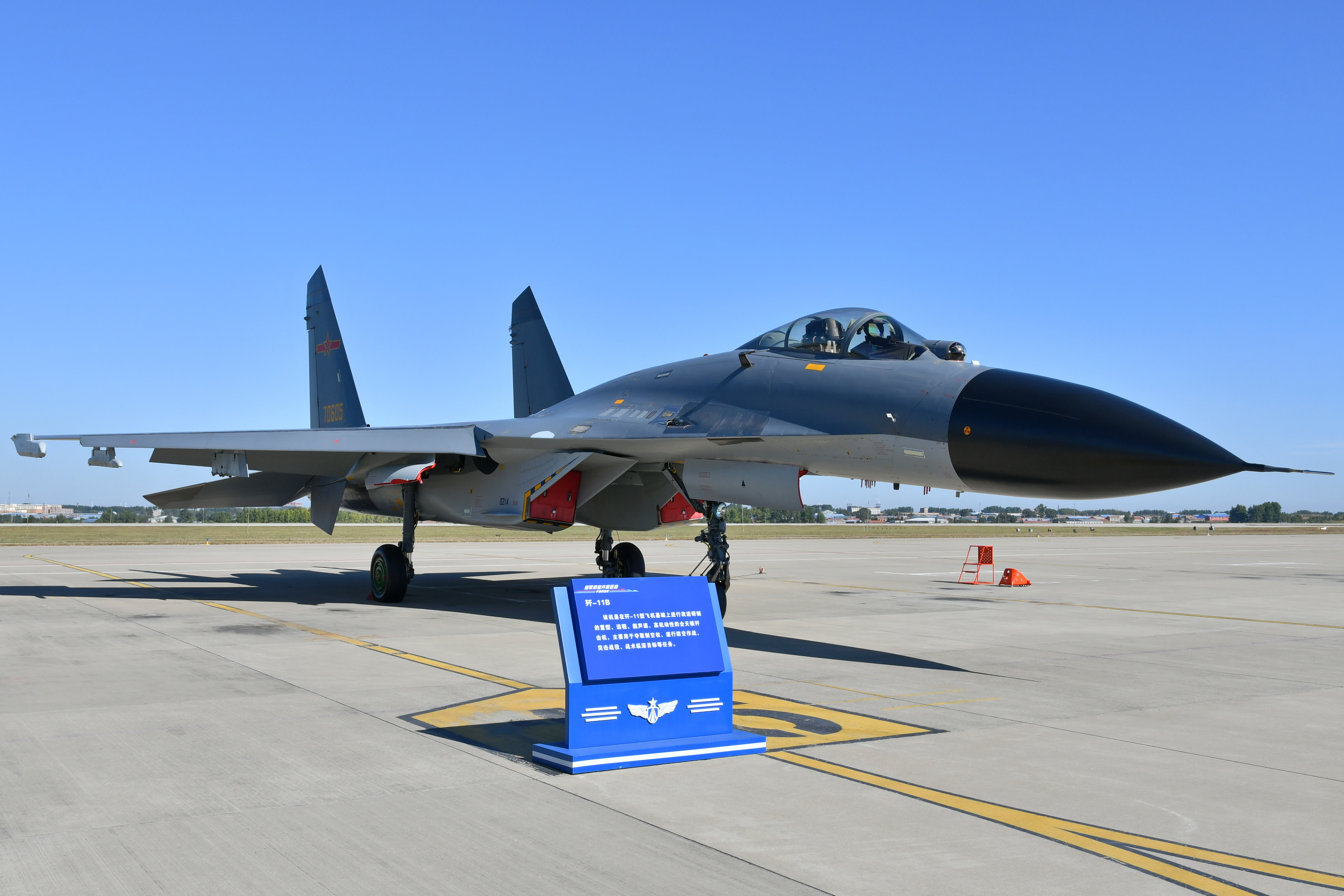
PLAAF J-11B at Chinese Air Force open day

The J-11B is a multirole variant of the J-11 incorporating Chinese subsystems. It was conceived as a way to remove the J-11's dependency on Russia. SAC unveiled a J-11B mockup in mid-2002. Three prototypes were delivered to the PLAAF for testing in 2006. The two-seater J-11BS followed two years after the J-11B. By 2011, reportedly 90% of the J-11B was based on subsystems and parts designed in China, with the engine presumably being a major part of the remainder. Many domestic subsystems are improvements of those found on the Su-27SK.

Chinese subsystems on the J-11B include Type 1493 radar, 3-axis data system, power supply system, emergency power unit, brake system, hydraulic system, fuel system, environment control system, molecular sieve oxygen generation systems, digital flight control system, and glass cockpit. The airframe is slightly lighter due to greater use of composites.

The J-11B may carry the PL-12 and PL-8B air-to-air missiles. The J-11BG upgrade is capable of PL-15 and PL-10 missiles as well.

=== Engine replacement ===
By 2004, the J-11 was being tested with the Shenyang WS-10. Testing may have started as early as 2002; an image from the 2002 China International Aviation & Aerospace Exhibition allegedly depicted a J-11 with one engine replaced with a WS-10. WS-10 development proved difficult. One regiment converted to WS-10-powered J-11Bs in 2007, but was grounded for an extended period due to poor operational reliability. The WS-10A reportedly matured enough after 2009 to power the J-11B Block 02 aircraft, and Jane's reported the J-11B as powered by the WS-10 in 2014.

== Operational history ==
PLAAF J-11Bs participated in Shaheen 1, a joint Sino-Pakistani exercise, in March 2011. This was the first time the PLAAF conducted "operational" aerial maneuvers in Pakistan with the PAF.

=== P-8 interception ===
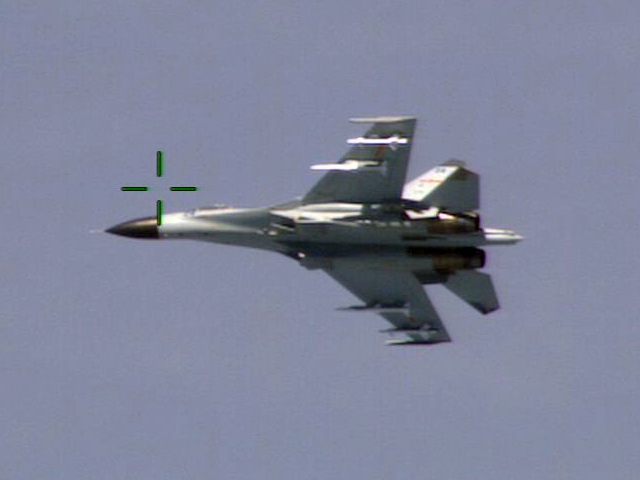
A J-11BH with two PL-8 and two PL-12 missiles as seen from a P-8.

On 19 August 2014 a J-11B intercepted a U.S. Navy P-8 Poseidon (P-8) anti-submarine warfare aircraft that was over the South China Sea.

The U.S. Department of Defense released details at a press conference on 22 August 2014 with Admiral John Kirby as spokesperson. According to Kirby, the incident occurred 135 miles (217 km) east of Hainan Island, in international airspace. The Chinese jet "crossed under the aircraft with one pass having only 50–100 feet [15–30 m] separation. The Chinese jet also passed the nose of the P-8 at 90 degrees with its belly toward the P-8 Poseidon, believed to be displaying its weapons load-out. Afterwards, the J-11 flew directly under and alongside the P-8, bringing their wingtips, as I said, to within 20 feet [6 m]. And then conducted a roll over the P-8, passing within 45 feet [14 m]." He said the "unprofessional" and "unsafe" actions of the Chinese pilot was "not keeping with the kind of military-to-military relationship" the U.S. sought to establish with China. An official complaint was sent to China through regular diplomatic channels. The Pentagon commented further that: "Military activities may be conducted within the Exclusive Economic Zone of another nation as an exercise of the freedoms of navigation and overflight."

In response, the Chinese Ministry of National Defense spokesman Yang Yujun said that the U.S. criticisms were "totally groundless" as the Chinese pilot professionally maintained a safe distance. Furthermore, he blamed the "massive and frequent close-in surveillance" by the U.S. as the root cause, and called for the end of surveillance flights to improve bilateral military ties.

== Variants ==
- J-11: The baseline variant assembled and produced by Shenyang Aircraft Corporation from complete Su-27SK kits supplied by Russia under the 1996 Sino-Russian licensed-production agreement. Early airframes relied heavily on Russian-made components.
- J-11A: A later improved production batch of the J-11, fitted with new cockpit displays and given the capability to employ the R-77E air-to-air missile. A combined total of 104 or 105 J-11s and J-11As were produced. In the mid-2010s, some J-11As were fitted with four Chinese-made missile approach warning system (MAWS) units. Reports also claimed further upgrades to the cockpit displays and fire-control system, although the publicly available imagery at the time did not confirm those changes.
- J-11B: An indigenized derivative of the J-11/Su-27SK, equipped with a Chinese-made Type 1493 pulse-Doppler radar, avionics and weapon systems. Because of technical problems with the WS-10 engine, the first production batch retained the Russian-made AL-31F; later batches adopted the WS-10A. The prototype first flew in 2004, and the first production batch entered service in 2007.
- J-11BH: A J-11B variant developed for the People's Liberation Army Naval Air Force, with deliveries beginning in 2010.
- J-11BS: A tandem-seat trainer variant of the J-11B.
- J-11BSH: The naval aviation variant of the J-11BS.
- J-11BG: An upgraded J-11B distinguished externally by its light-grey radome. In 2019, Janes reported that the change had prompted speculation that an active electronically scanned array (AESA) radar had been fitted, while the designation “J-11BG” also began appearing in public reporting. The aircraft's AESA radar could support the PL-10 and PL-15 air-to-air missiles.
- J-11BHG: The corresponding upgrade of the J-11BH. The letter G standing for gai (改, “modified”).
- J-11D: The J-11D featured an improved airframe, a new fly-by-wire flight-control system, WS-10B engines and an active electronically scanned array (AESA) radar. Three prototypes were built between 2015 and mid-2016, after which the programme was abandoned. Its avionics technology was subsequently adopted by the navy for the J-15B.

== Accidents and incidents ==
- On December 7, 2017, a J-11B from the Western Theater Command Air Force's 111th Aviation Brigade crashed during a training exercise. The pilot, Captain Huang Peng, was killed in the crash after reportedly attempting to save the aircraft. Huang was posthumously awarded martyr status.

== Operators ==
China

- People's Liberation Army Air Force: 100 J-11A, 180 J-11B and 90 J-11BS (as of 2018)
  - 111th Aviation Brigade - Korla Air Base
- People's Liberation Army Naval Air Force: 40 J-11BH and 32 J-11BSH (as of 2018)

== Specifications (J-11A/J-11) ==
Data from

General characteristics

- Crew: 1
- Length: 21.9 m (71 ft 10 in)
- Wingspan: 14.7 m (48 ft 3 in)
- Height: 5.92 m (19 ft 5 in)
- Wing area: 52.84 m^{2} (568.8 sq ft)
- Gross weight: 23,926 kg (52,748 lb)
- Max takeoff weight: 33,000 kg (72,753 lb)
- Fuel capacity: 9,400 kg (20,700 lb) internal fuel
- Powerplant: 2 × Shenyang WS-10A "Taihang" afterburning turbofans, 132 kN (30,000 lbf) thrust each (J-11B Block 02)

Performance

- Maximum speed: Mach 2.35 (2,500 km/h, 1,553 mph) at altitude
- Range: 3,530 km (2,190 mi, 1,910 nmi)
- Service ceiling: 18,500 m (60,700 ft) without external ordnance and stores
- g limits: +9

Armament

- Guns: 1× 30 mm (1.18 in) Gryazev-Shipunov GSh-30-1 cannon with 150 rounds
- Hardpoints: 10: 2 under fuselage, 2 under air ducts, 4 under wings, 2 on wingtips , with provisions to carry combinations of:
  - Missiles:
    - PL-15 (Later B models and J-11D only)
    - PL-12
    - PL-10 (Later B and D models)
    - PL-9
    - PL-8
    - Vympel R-77
    - Vympel R-27
    - Vympel R-73
- Rockets: Unguided rocket launcher
- Bombs: Free-fall cluster bombs

Avionics

- Fire-control radar: NIIP Tikhomirov N001VE Myech coherent pulse Doppler radar, or Type 1493 radar (J-11B)
- OEPS-27 electro-optic system
- NSts-27 helmet-mounted sight (HMS)
- Gardeniya ECM pods

== See also ==
Related development

- Sukhoi Su-27
- Shenyang J-15
- Shenyang J-16

Aircraft of comparable role, configuration, and era

- Boeing F/A-18E/F Super Hornet
- Dassault Rafale
- Eurofighter Typhoon
- Grumman F-14 Tomcat
- McDonnell Douglas F-15 Eagle/Mitsubishi F-15J
- Sukhoi Su-30
- Sukhoi Su-30MKK
- Sukhoi Su-35

Related lists

- List of fighter aircraft
