= Beijing Xijiao Airport =

Military airport in Beijing

北京西郊机场 Beijing Xijiao Airport
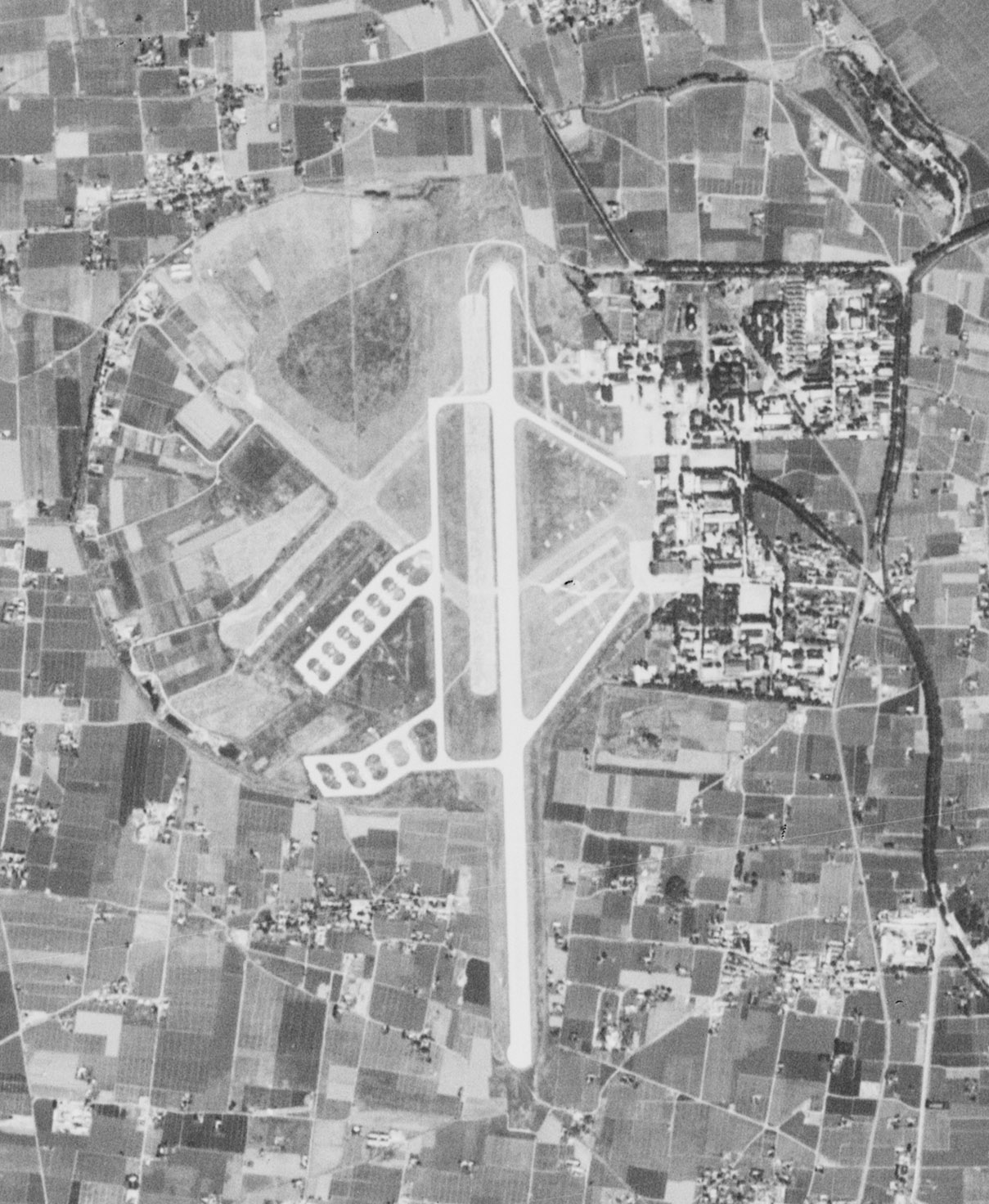
- Satellite photo (taken on September 20, 1967)
- IATA: none; ICAO: ZBXJ

Summary
- Airport type: Military
- Serves: Beijing
- Opened: 1938; 88 years ago
- Occupants: People's Liberation Army Air Force
- Elevation AMSL: 164 ft / 50 m
- Coordinates: 39°57′40″N 116°15′23″E
- Interactive map of 北京西郊机场

Runways
Direction	Length		Surface
Direction	ft	m	Surface
18/36 (Note: There are planes taking off in both directions.)	8,200	2,500	Concrete

Statistics
- The width of the runway: 50m
- Air tube radio frequency: 125.9MHz

Beijing Xijiao Airport is a military airport in Beijing, China. It was also used by charter flights. It is located in Haidian District, 19.75 miles (31.78 km) from Beijing Capital International Airport and about 8 miles (13 km) from the city centre. It has one runway numbered 18/36.

== History ==
Xijiao Airport was built in 1938 by the Imperial Japanese Army during the Second Sino-Japanese War, and its ownership was transferred to the Nationalist government after the surrender of Japan in 1945. Since January 1949, North China Aviation Bureau of the People's Liberation Army officially took over the management of Xijiao Airport, and formed the North China Air Transportation Brigade, which mainly consists of former Republic of China Air Force pilots.

On the 60th anniversary of the People's Republic of China, all aircraft that flew over Tiananmen took off from Xijiao Airport, and continued on to land at Beijing Nanyuan Airport.
