= Iryna Benatova =

Ukrainian literary scholar and Bulgarist (1951–1982)

Irina Benatova
- Ірина Михайлівна Бенатова
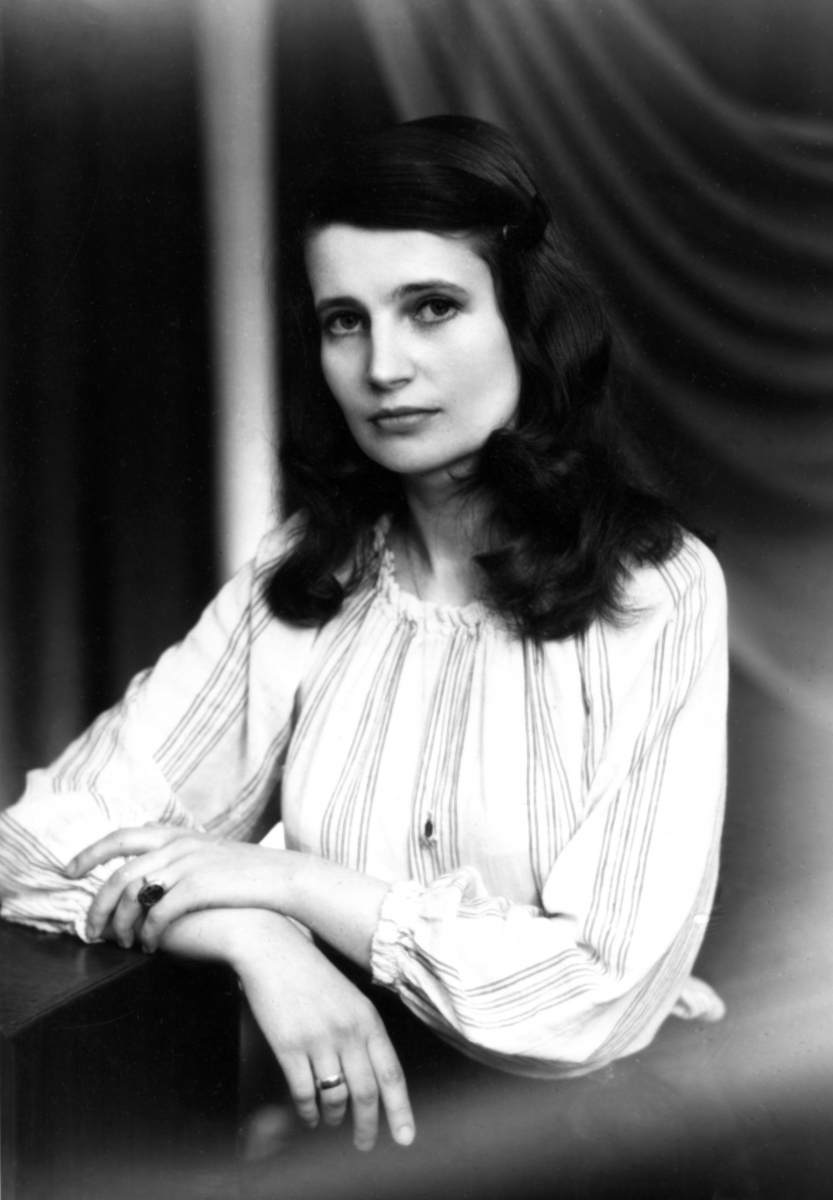
- Born: Irina Mykhailivna Matiienko; 19 January 1951; Magadan, Russian SFSR, Soviet Union
- Died: 28 June 1982 (aged 31) near Verbovichi, Narowlya district, Byelorussian SSR, Soviet Union

Academic background
- Education: University of Lviv; University of Warsaw
- Academic advisor: Nonna Kopystianska

Academic work
- Discipline: Literary studies
- Sub-discipline: Slavic studies; Bulgarian studies
- Institutions: Kyiv Institute of Civil Aviation Engineers
- Main interests: Bulgarian literature; literary ballad; interwar poetry
- Notable works: The Ballad in Bulgarian Literature of the 1920s and 1930s

Irina Mykhailivna Benatova (Ukrainian: Ірина Михайлівна Бенатова; née Matiienko, Ukrainian: Матієнко; 19 January 1951 – 28 June 1982) was a Ukrainian literary scholar, Slavist, and specialist in Bulgarian studies.

Her research focused on the development and poetics of the literary ballad in Bulgarian poetry of the 1920s and 1930s.

Benatova completed a dissertation on the subject shortly before her death. The manuscript, together with several of her other studies, was published posthumously in 2015 as Баллада в болгарской литературе 20–30-х годов XX века (The Ballad in Bulgarian Literature of the 1920s and 1930s). Her research was discussed in a dedicated chapter by Bulgarian literary historian Ivan Radev and was separately reviewed by Stiliyan Stoyanov in the academic journal Orbis Linguarum.

== Early life and education ==
Benatova was born Irina Mykhailivna Matiienko on 19 January 1951 in Magadan, in the Russian SFSR. She spent her childhood in the Soviet Far East and northern Russia. In 1969, she completed secondary school in Afrikanda, Murmansk Oblast, after which her family returned to Ukraine.

From 1969 to 1970, she worked as a drafter at a scientific design bureau of the E. O. Paton Electric Welding Institute of the Academy of Sciences of the Ukrainian SSR.

In 1970, Benatova entered the Department of Slavic Languages of the Faculty of Philology at Ivan Franko State University of Lviv, now the University of Lviv. During the 1973–1974 academic year, she studied at the Faculty of Polish Philology of the University of Warsaw.

She graduated from the University of Lviv in 1977 and subsequently undertook postgraduate study there. Her academic supervisor was literary scholar Nonna Kopystianska.

== Academic career and research ==
Benatova completed her postgraduate studies in 1980. Under Kopystianska's supervision, she prepared a dissertation for the degree of Candidate of Philological Sciences entitled The Ballad in Bulgarian Literature of the 1920s and 1930s.

From 1981 until her death, Benatova taught Russian at the preparatory faculty for international students of the Kyiv Institute of Civil Aviation Engineers, now the National Aviation University.

Her research examined the development of the Bulgarian literary ballad between the two world wars, including its relationship with folklore, lyric poetry, revolutionary themes, and the broader development of modern Bulgarian literature. She also considered parallels between Bulgarian ballads and Russian, Ukrainian, Polish, and Czech literary traditions.

In 1982, the Bulgarian literary-studies journal Literaturna misal published her study of the influence of Hristo Botev's ballad “Hadji Dimitar” on works by Teodor Trayanov, Geo Milev, and Nikolay Hrelkov.

Benatova's dissertation had been completed and accepted for defence at Leningrad State University shortly before her death. It remained unpublished for more than three decades. In 2015, Lviv Polytechnic Publishing House issued the dissertation and a selection of her other scholarly writings as a 368-page monograph.

== Scholarly reception ==
In his 2014 book Bulgarian–Russian Encounters in the Literature of the Nineteenth and Twentieth Centuries, Bulgarian literary historian Ivan Radev devoted a chapter entitled “On Bulgarian Poetry—with Demonstrated Professionalism and Insight” to Benatova's research. The chapter occupies pages 274–291 of the volume.

In his foreword to the 2015 publication of Benatova's monograph, Radev argued that her research had retained its scholarly relevance more than three decades after it was written. He observed that no subsequent comprehensive study had displaced her analysis of the Bulgarian ballad of the interwar period.

The monograph was also reviewed by Stiliyan Stoyanov in the 2015 second issue of the academic journal Езиков свят – Orbis Linguarum. The review discussed Benatova's treatment of the genre, historical development, and poetics of the Bulgarian literary ballad.

Benatova's monograph has subsequently been cited in scholarship on the historical and theoretical development of the ballad genre.

== Death ==
On 28 June 1982, Benatova died at the age of 31 in the crash of Aeroflot Flight 8641, a scheduled flight from Leningrad to Kyiv. The Yakovlev Yak-42 crashed near the village of Verbovichi in the Narowlya district of the Byelorussian SSR, killing all 132 people aboard.

== Selected works ==
- Benatova, Irina (1982). Мотивът Ботевата балада „Хаджи Димитър“, отразен в творчеството на Теодор Траянов, Гео Милев и Николай Хрелков [The motif of Botev's ballad “Hadji Dimitar” as reflected in the works of Teodor Trayanov, Geo Milev and Nikolay Hrelkov]. Literaturna misal (in Bulgarian): 73–91.
- Benatova, Irina (2015). Баллада в болгарской литературе 20–30-х годов XX века [The Ballad in Bulgarian Literature of the 1920s and 1930s] (in Russian). Lviv: Lviv Polytechnic Publishing House. p. 368. ISBN 978-617-607-764-0.
