= Nonna Kopystianska =

Ukrainian literary scholar (1924–2013)

- Нонна Хомівна Копистянська
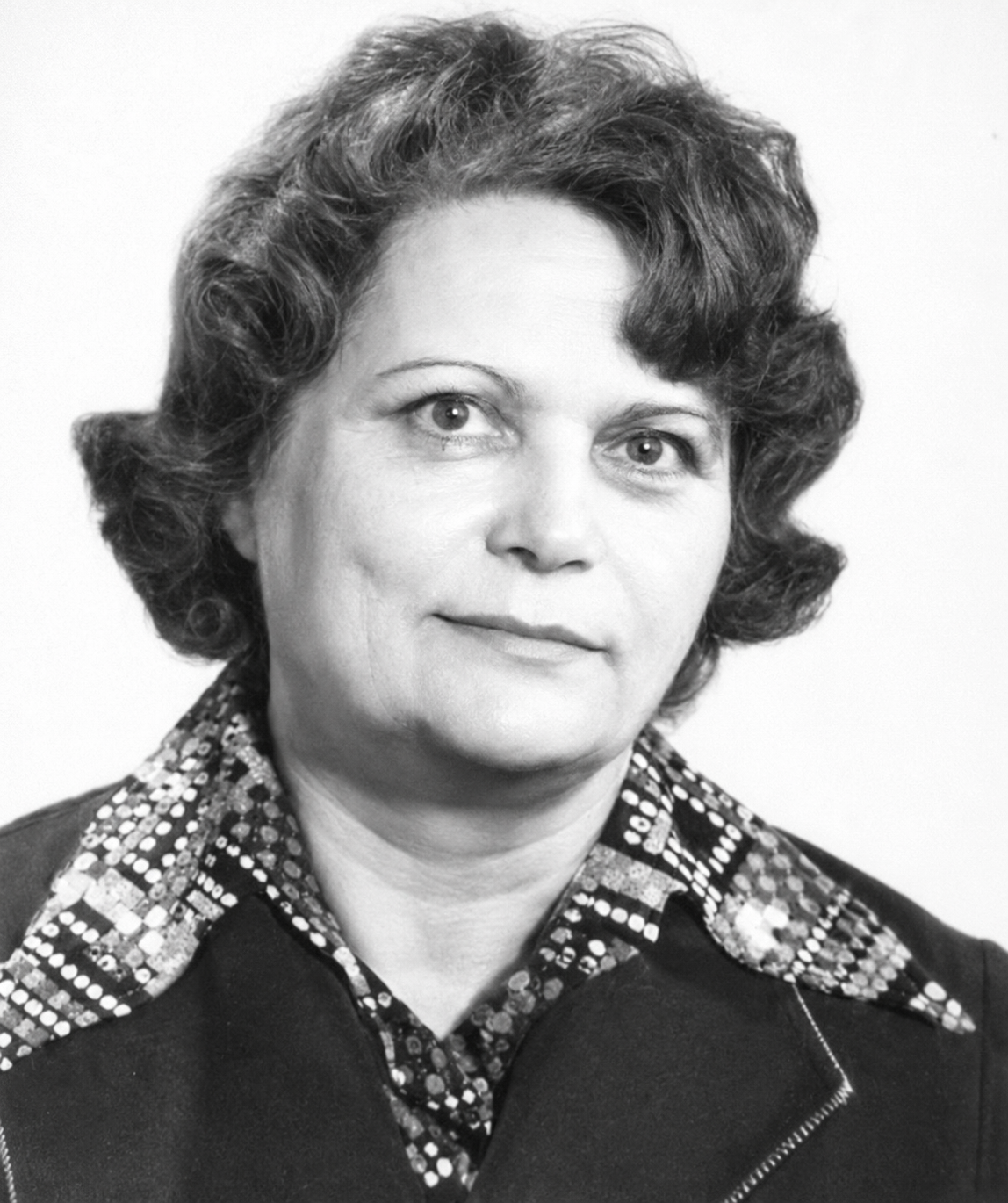
- Nonna Kopystianska
- Born: 18 April 1924; Zdolbuniv, Ukrainian SSR, Soviet Union
- Died: 7 April 2013 (aged 88); Lviv, Ukraine
- Spouse: Roman Kopystianskyi
- Children: Igor Kopystiansky
- Awards: Honoured Professor of the University of Lviv (2002); F. X. Šalda Memorial Medal for the development of literary Bohemistics (1995)

Academic background
- Education: University of Lviv
- Thesis: Genre modifications in Czech literature during the formation of socialist realism (1983)
- Academic advisors: Oleksii Chicherin; Ilarion Sventsitsky

Academic work
- Discipline: Literary studies
- Sub-discipline: Genre studies, comparative literature, Czech literature, literary chronotope
- Institutions: Ivan Franko National University of Lviv
- Notable students: Iryna Benatova; Svitlana Matsenka; Oksana Levytska
- Notable ideas: Four-level model of literary genre

Nonna Khomivna Kopystianska (Ukrainian: Нонна Хомівна Копистянська; 18 April 1924 – 7 April 2013), also transliterated as Nonna Kopystyanska, was a Ukrainian literary scholar, Slavist, and professor at the University of Lviv. She specialized in Czech literature, literary genre theory, comparative literature, and the representation of time and space in literature.

Later scholarship has described Kopystianska's theory of genre and genre systems as part of the foundation of contemporary genre studies. Her concepts and theoretical propositions continued to be cited and developed by Ukrainian and international researchers after her death. She also established a research school devoted to literary time, space, and rhythm.

== Early life and education ==
Kopystianska was born on 18 April 1924 in Zdolbuniv, in what is now Rivne Oblast, Ukraine. She graduated from the philological faculty of the University of Lviv in 1951, specializing in Czech language and literature.

She subsequently completed postgraduate study in Czech literature. In 1955 she defended a candidate dissertation on Transcarpathian Ukraine in the works of the Czech writer Ivan Olbracht. Her later doctoral dissertation, Genre modifications in Czech literature during the formation of socialist realism, was successfully defended in Leningrad in 1983; she received the degree of Doctor of Philological Sciences in 1984.

== Academic career ==
Kopystianska joined the University of Lviv in 1955 and worked there for more than five decades. From 1984 she was a professor in the department of foreign literature, later renamed the department of world literature. She received the academic title of professor in 1986.

Her teaching covered nineteenth- and twentieth-century world literature, literary theory, and methods of teaching literature. In 2002 the University of Lviv named her an Honoured Professor of the university.

== Scholarship and influence ==
Kopystianska's research combined literary history, genre theory, comparative literature, and poetics. Her early work concentrated on Czech literature, including Ivan Olbracht and the development of Czech prose. She later developed a systematic account of genre and genre systems and studied the relationship between genre formation, artistic method, and changes in cultural worldviews.

Her model distinguished four levels, or "spheres", of genre: genre as a general theoretical category; genre as a historically bounded category; genre within a particular national literature; and genre as realized in the individual work of an author. This model was intended to explain how genres can remain theoretically stable while changing historically, nationally, and individually.

A second major area of her work was literary time, space, rhythm, and the chronotope. She examined the interaction of time and space in works by writers including Miguel de Cervantes, Gustave Flaubert, Franz Kafka, Andrei Platonov, and Anna Seghers. Her 2012 monograph Time and Space in the Art of the Word systematized this work.

In 1997 Kopystianska founded and led the International Interdisciplinary Scientific and Methodological Seminar-Association "Problems of Artistic Time, Space, and Rhythm". According to a study of her research school, the association operated for fifteen years, involved more than 140 participants from fifteen countries, organized conference sessions, developed terminology, and produced thematic publications and bibliographic resources.

Literary scholar Ihor Kozlyk devoted a separate study to the methodological structure of Kopystianska's research practices. A peer-reviewed study of her school concluded that its contribution to the study of literary time, space, and rhythm was substantial and presented it as a model for organizing scholarly cooperation around a defined research problem.

== Legacy ==
A 416-page memorial scholarly volume, Dialohichni obertony (Dialogic Overtones), devoted to Kopystianska's work was published in 2014 by the Ivan Franko Institute of the National Academy of Sciences of Ukraine. The same year, the institute held a scholarly conference in her memory.

In 2024, a centenary assessment in Inozemna Philologia stated that Kopystianska's genre theory remained in active scholarly use and that researchers continued to develop concepts associated with her work.

== Personal life ==
Kopystianska was married to petroleum geologist Roman Kopystianskyi. Their son, Igor, became a visual artist. She died in Lviv on 7 April 2013 and was buried at Lychakiv Cemetery.

== Selected works ==
- Kopystianska, Nonna (1978). Жанровые модификации в чешской литературе: период становления социалистического реализма [Genre modifications in Czech literature: The period of the formation of socialist realism] (in Russian). Lviv: Vyshcha shkola.
- Kopystianska, Nonna (1991). Иван Ольбрахт — человек, писатель, публицист [Ivan Olbracht: Man, writer, publicist] (in Russian). Lviv: Svit.
- Kopystianska, Nonna (2005). Жанр, жанрова система у просторі літературознавства [Genre and the genre system in the space of literary studies] (in Ukrainian). Lviv: PAIS. ISBN 966-7651-29-0.
- Kopystianska, Nonna (2012). Час і простір у мистецтві слова [Time and space in the art of the word] (in Ukrainian). Lviv: PAIS. ISBN 978-966-1585-89-7.
