= Aerosvit Flight 241 =

1997 aviation accident

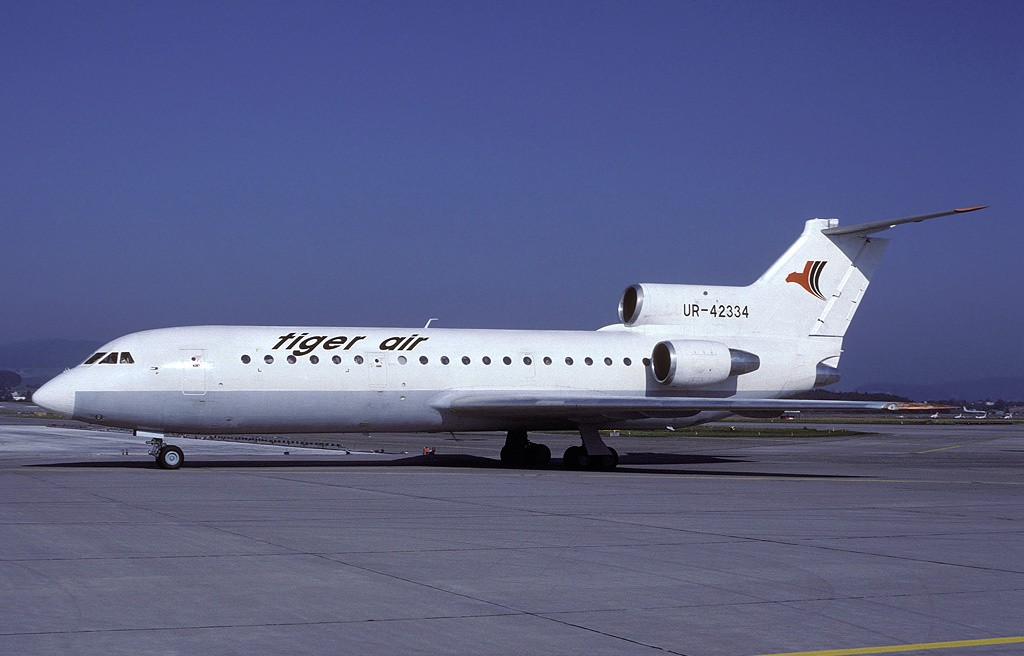
- UR-42334, the aircraft involved while in service with Tiger Air in August 1997

Accident
- Date: 17 December 1997
- Summary: Controlled flight into terrain due to pilot error, cockpit confusion
- Site: Pierian Mountains, near Thessaloniki Airport, Thessaloniki, Greece; 40°13′33″N 22°15′03″E

Aircraft
- Aircraft type: Yakovlev Yak-42
- Operator: Aerosvit – Ukrainian Airlines
- Call sign: AEROSVIT 241
- Registration: UR-42334
- Flight origin: Odesa International Airport, Odesa, Ukraine
- Destination: Thessaloniki Airport, Thessaloniki, Greece
- Occupants: 70
- Passengers: 62
- Crew: 8
- Fatalities: 70
- Survivors: 0

Aerosvit Flight 241 (VV241/AEW241) was a scheduled international passenger flight from the Ukrainian city of Odesa to Thessaloniki, Greece. On 17 December 1997, the Yakovlev Yak-42 operating the flight registered as UR-42334 flew into a mountainside during a missed approach into Thessaloniki in Greece. All 70 people aboard were killed.

Investigation by the Greek Aircraft Accidents Inquiry Council concluded that the crash was caused by the flight crew's navigational error. The crew were disoriented and lost during the aircraft's second approach to Thessaloniki. Despite numerous cues, the confused crew refused to declare emergency over the situation and decided to re-orient themselves. The crew failed to follow the route that they were supposed to take and the aircraft ultimately crashed onto the mountains.

In light of the investigation, both the Ukrainian and Hellenic authorities were urged to create a compulsory CFIT training for all pilots in both countries. The Ukrainian State Department of Aviation Transport was urged to include compulsory cockpit resource management (CRM) training to all flight crews and the Hellenic Civil Aviation Authority was asked to provide radar facility for Thessaloniki Airport.

== Flight ==
Aerosvit Flight 241 was a regularly scheduled international passenger flight from Odesa, Ukraine to Thessaloniki, the capital of Greece's Macedonia region and the second-largest city in the country. The flight was originally scheduled to be operated by a Boeing 737. The first sector of the flight from Lviv-Odesa was operated by a Boeing 737 but due to engine issues the aircraft was replaced with a Yakovlev Yak-42. The flight continued towards Thessaloniki through Ukrainian and Bulgarian airspace.

Flight 241 entered Greek airspace from Odesa at 20:39 local time. The crew immediately contacted Thessaloniki's Makedonia Approach. At the time, the air traffic controller was instructing an Olympic Airways flight near the area to descend to 3,500 ft (1,100 m). The crew of Flight 241 mistook this message, thinking that it was for them, and read the message back to the controller. The controller later clarified the issue and asked the crew of Flight 241 to stand by. Flight 241 was then cleared to descend for a VOR-DME-ILS approach to Runway 16.

The aircraft somehow arrived in Thessaloniki at a very high altitude and continued to pass over the airport, heading south. The controller noticed this and informed the crew on the situation. They were then instructed to climb to 6,000 ft (1,800 m) and maintain their flight within the south holding pattern, before later instructed to get out of the holding pattern and to turn back to the airport's VOR by turning right, towards the north, which was acknowledged by the crew.

During the flight crew's attempt to approach the airport for the second time, the controller repeatedly asked about their position for confirmation. The crew stated that they were on the right track and the controller instructed them to follow the route. At this time, based on the information from the crew, they should have been at the north of the airport. The crew didn't report any problems regarding the approach procedure. However, later on the crew suddenly requested a radar vector to the controller. Since Thessaloniki was not provided with a radar, the controller refused for radar vectoring and asked the crew to comply with the written procedure for an approach to Runway 16. The controller then began to worry about the crew's actual comprehension on the procedure for an approach to the airport. He later asked the crew on whether they actually knew the VOR-DME-ILS approach procedure for Runway 16, to which the crew answered with "Now…proceeding VOR… 3,500 feet confirm?". The controller was relieved with the answer and then asked the crew to adhere with the ILS approach and report back when they were established on the localizer.

At 21:11 local time, the controller asked the crew on whether they had been established on the localizer. The crew responded with "Turn right to beacon". ATC then asked the crew to report back if they had reached the localizer's outer marker, to which the crew answered with "Outer marker will report". This was the last transmission from the crew. Flight 241 then ceased all contact with Thessaloniki. The aircraft was declared as missing.

== Search and rescue ==
The Greek military was notified on the disappearance of Flight 241 and a search and rescue party was immediately formed. The search and rescue operation was initially concentrated to the north as it was the last reported position from the crew. After obtaining the radar data from the Hellenic Air Force, it was subsequently revealed that the aircraft was actually flown towards the west and later to the southwest of the airport. Locals also reported that there was a bright flash near the area. The search and rescue operation were eventually shifted to the area around Katerini and specifically around the Pieria Mountains. Operation was commenced at 23:00 local time, involving members of the Hellenic Coast Guard, Hellenic Navy, Hellenic Army, Hellenic Air Force, Hellenic Police and the Special Disaster Intervention Unit. Members of local ski clubs and mountains climbers also participated as volunteers.

The search and rescue operation were hampered by adverse weather condition in the area. Low dense fogs had prevented rescuers to conduct low flights around the area. The search for the wreckage was also rendered difficult due to the fact that the Yak-42 was not equipped with an Emergency Locator Transmitter (ELT).

On 19 December, the Greek army deployed 5,000 people to participate in the search and rescue operation. Twenty-nine helicopters and five hundred vehicles were also deployed to join the operation. However, bad weather still hampered the search and rescue effort and the search was later suspended.

On 20 December, three days after the initial accident, a Hellenic Navy helicopter spotted signs of treetops that had been cut. The site was pinpointed and the search and rescue team immediately reached the site. The wreckage was found at an elevation of 1,100 m, located in a gorge and was buried in heavy snow with debris strewn over a large area. No survivors were found at the crash site. All 70 passengers and crew aboard Flight 241 had perished. In a coincidence, a Lockheed C-130 Hercules operated by the Hellenic Air Force, participating in the search for Flight 241, crashed at Pastra Mountain during its descent to Tanagra Air Base, killing all five crew members.

== Aircraft ==
The flight was operated by a Yakovlev Yak-42, registration UR-42334. The aircraft first flew in 1986 and was delivered to Aeroflot in June 1986 as CCCP-42334. It was later delivered to Air Ukraine with a registration of UR-42334. In November 1997 it returned from a seven-month lease period to Tiger Air, a Yugoslavia-based charter company. The accident flight was operated under a wet lease agreement with Aerosvit. The aircraft had accumulated 12,008 flight hours and 6,836 cycles.

The Yak-42 was equipped with three Lotarev D-36 turboshaft engines. As it was designed by the Yakovlev Design Bureau under the USSR, the aircraft was equipped with the Eastern European navigation system, which was different from the ones that were used in the West. To comply with the western navigation system for the VOR-DME-ILS approach procedure, the Yak-42 should be equipped with a small control panel, above the cockpit instrument panel. There was no evidence, however, that such modification had been conducted. The aircraft manufacturer, Yakovlev, claimed that the data from the involved aircraft had not been recorded by them.

== Passengers and crew ==
Flight 241 was carrying 62 passengers and eight crew members. The passengers were consisted of six children, 16 women and 40 men. There were conflicting reports on the nationalities of the passengers. According to the President of Aerosvit Airlines, Leonid Pogrebnyak, at least 34 passengers were Greeks, 24 were Ukrainians, two were from Poland, and one was from Germany. However, Head of Ukraine's Ministry of Emergency, Tatiana Pomazanova, stated that 42 passengers were Greeks and the others were Ukrainians. The instructor pilot, captain and the co-pilot were Russian, while the flight engineer and the rest of the crew were Ukrainian. The Director of Thessaloniki State Construction Company, Melina Emfietzoglou, stated that 23 of the passengers were employees of the company who were travelling home to spend their Christmas holiday with their families.

Among the passengers were Masha Lobas, the wife of Ukrainian football player Volodymyr Lobas and daughter of former USSR biathlon athlete Ivan Biakov, who was travelling with her children to visit the funeral of her husband's grandmother; and Rinata Iosifovna Lemeshko, the wife of Ukrainian football coach Yevhen Lemeshko and the mother-in-law of Ukrainian football player Oleh Protasov.

The commander of the flight was identified as Aleksii Vcherashnyii. He was the captain of the flight and had accrued a total flying time of 9,850 hours with 2,300 total hours on the Yak-42. The unnamed co-pilot had accumulated a total flying time of 6,700 hours in which 3,000 of them were on the Yak-42. The unnamed instructor pilot had a total flying time of 16,210 hours. According to the Greek investigation agency, he had accumulated 5,350 total flying hours on the Yakovlev Yak-42.

== Investigation ==
As the crash happened in Greece, an independent committee was immediately set up by the Greek government to investigate the crash. Under the Hellenic Civil Aviation Authority, the government formed the Aircraft Accidents Inquiry Council. The investigation was also assisted by representatives from Russia as the state of the aircraft manufacturer and from Ukraine as the state of the aircraft registration.

The flight recorders were recovered from the crash site in good condition and were taken to the German Flight Accident Investigation in Braunschweig for a readout.

=== Navigational error ===
It was apparent that some sort of navigational error had occurred on board Flight 241. The ATC had instructed the crew to head north for a second landing attempt and the crew had confirmed to the ATC that they were on the right track. Hence, if Flight 241 did crash then the wreckage should have been discovered at the north. However, it somehow ended up in the Pieria Mountains, southwest of the airport.

For an approach to Runway 16, the crew were required to make an approach from the north of the airport

Examination on the recorder revealed that the No. 1 VOR receiver of the aircraft, located on the captain side, was actually inoperative. According to the investigation, the instrument had malfunctioned during the aircraft's approach to Odesa. Despite the condition, the aircraft somehow was allowed to fly to Greece. Due to the malfunction, the localizer signal could not be obtained by the faulty instrument. The CVR and FDR recording further showed that during the crew's attempt to approach Thessaloniki, they didn't follow the supposed procedure for an approach. In accordance with the approach chart of Runway 16 of Thessaloniki Airport, the crew had to come from the north of the airport first. The crew had been instructed by the ATC to pass through waypoint LAMBI, a waypoint located at the northeast of the airport, and then to enter a north holding area. For a VOR-DME ILS approach through waypoint LAMBI, the crew had to turn towards an "arc" first and later turned to the left towards the ILS localizer of Runway 16. The localizer was supposed to help the crew make a stabilized approach by guiding the pilots to the runway with two beams, one of which was to tell the pilots on whether they were high or low and the other was to tell the pilots on whether they were on the right or the left of the runway centerline. These beams would have eventually guided the crew to Runway 16. Flight 241 didn't follow the ATC's instruction to turn towards the supposed "arc" for waypoint LAMBI. Instead, the aircraft flew directly towards the airport's beacon. As such, they were unable to make a stabilized approach. Due to the crew's decision to fly directly towards the beacon, the aircraft overshot the ILS localizer and the crew were unable to descend with the required rate of descent for landing. The aircraft eventually arrived at the airport at a very high altitude and missed its landing at the airport.

The flight crew, who were unaware of the missed landing, were informed by the ATC that they had passed the airport. They were then instructed to climb to 6,000 ft (1,800 m) and maintain their flight within the south holding pattern, before later instructed to get out of the holding pattern and to turn back to the airport's VOR by turning right, which was acknowledged by the crew. The crew were later asked to confirm their position again if they had reached the VOR and the message was read back by the crew. According to the CVR, immediately after the read back, the crew attempted to tune the VOR and the Captain asked the crew about the direction that he was supposed to take. The crew suggested the captain to follow the instruction that had been given by the ATC.

18:58:43	Captain	So, which heading should be taken? Take a look..
18:58:49	First Officer	To the right. He has given a VOR to you
	Captain	I've got ADF set-up
18:59:13	Instructor pilot	Set-up the VOR. Go ahead to the VOR, go to the VOR
18:59:19	Captain	To which VOR? ...Well we should go to the left.

Flight 241 then turned left, exactly opposite of what had been instructed by the ATC, and headed west. The captain apparently had misinterpreted the information that had been given by the selected radio-navigation equipment. The ATC then repeatedly asked the crew if they were on the right course for a second approach to Thessaloniki and the crew kept stating that they were on the right track. In the cockpit, however, the crew were pre-occupied with their navigation instrument. The instructor pilot began to doubt on the setting of the VOR and started to question on whether the VOR signal had actually worked or not. The crew started to discuss on their altitude, their heading, and their radio frequencies.

The crew were then asked about their position again, whether they were on the north of Thessaloniki or not. The crew confirmed that they were on the north of the airport and didn't declare any problems on board. The ATC then asked the crew to descend to 3,500 ft (1,100 m). He then diverted his attention to another domestic flight. However, in the cockpit, the crew were already confused with their exact position. They continued to discuss on their altitude, heading and their speed. At the time, the aircraft was on heading 270°, approximately 10 nautical miles (19 kilometres) southwest from the airport. Overwhelmed, the Captain then asked his crew to request radar vectoring. Meanwhile, his co-pilot and the instructor pilot were busy concentrating on the ADF, a basic navigation instrument which would have pointed the crew towards the airport's beacon. The ATC immediately refused their request and tried to explain that there was no radar vectoring in Thessaloniki. The ATC then asked the crew to comply with the procedure for an approach to Runway 16. The flight crew were more confused than ever. The instructor pilot then took the opportunity to "stretch the system" and give the crew some training, including the heading, the track, and the radio navigation equipment.

Investigation on the provided Jeppesen approach chart revealed that the crew might have thought that the airport was a radar facility due to the letter R which was inaccurately displayed on the chart. The letter R was actually for military radar service and not for civilian radar. The military would have provided radar upon the crew's request.

Later on, another position report was requested by the ATC. Shortly after the crew answered his question, the ATC asked on whether the crew could actually follow the approach procedure to Runway 16. Unsure, the crew could only respond with "Wilco AEW". Seeking further confirmation, the ATC asked the same question for the last time, to which the crew answered, in hesitated tone, "Now... proceeding VOR...3,500 feet, confirm?". The ATC, who was relieved with their answer, then asked the crew to report back later.

As the crew continued the flight, they also continued to discuss on their orientation and navigation. They were pre-occupied with the setting of the ADF. The crew had tried to interpret the information that had been given by their navigation equipment. They often changed their attention from VOR, of which the missed approach procedure was based on, to the ADF. The different readings caused great confusion among the crew.

The flight engineer then stated that the ADF had been set up. The co-pilot asked the Captain to turn back towards the airport's beacon, which at the time was behind Flight 241. The captain agreed and reported to the ATC that they would turn the aircraft to the right towards the beacon. This was the first time the aircraft had actually turned to the right after the ATC instruction. However, it was already too late for the crew to turn right towards the airport, as the aircraft was already way off course and by doing so would eventually cause the aircraft to crash to the mountains. The correct input would have been a turn to the left to avoid terrain.

The crew never achieved situational awareness during the entire flight and were pre-occupied with the settings of the radio-navigation aid and data interpretation from the navigational instruments.

=== Cockpit confusion ===
The flight to Thessaloniki was the first ever flight for all the flight crew. None of the crew had any experience for an approach to the airport and not a single crew member understood the specific approach procedure. During the second approach attempt, the flight path was not monitored and, according to the investigation, the flight crew could not produce a certain "mental image" of the procedure that was supposed to be followed.

The recordings revealed that all 4 flight crew were confused with the provided data from their radio-navigational instruments. Following the confusion, each flight crew diverted their focus to the navigation system, abandoning their supposed roles in the flight. There were numerous times when the flight crew argued with each other regarding their position, location and heading of their aircraft. They all held different opinions on their instrument and each of their opinions for most of the times, according to the investigators, were equally false. This conflict of opinions immediately caused breakdown of the aircraft's cockpit resource management (CRM).

The non-existent CRM further caused deterioration in the crew performance. There was technically no commander in the cockpit and as a result during the last 30 minutes of the flight, the crew didn't conduct any checklist. The presence of the instructor pilot, who was seated at the right seat, further compounded the CRM breakdown as he mostly distracted the other flight crew from their job. Even though the pilots were confused with their orientation, the instructor pilot somehow took this particular critical time as an opportunity to train the crew. In the end, despite the difficulties that they were facing during the second approach, they didn't understand the gravity of their situation and eventually didn't declare emergency to the ATC and decided to re-orient themselves. Ultimately, these actions caused the aircraft to go astray.

The decreased situational awareness of the crew further contributed to their lack of response to the GPWS warning that had sounded for at least 4 times. During the first two alerts (prior to their second approach), both warnings lasted for four seconds and the flight crew didn't initiate a climb. On the third alert, at 19:12:08, the crew didn't react again, even though the radio altitude was rapidly decreasing. The flight crew finally realized the danger that they were facing when the fourth alarm sounded, at 19:12:32, during which the red "ground proximity" warning was illuminated. The Captain then initiated the climb manoeuvre to evade the mountain. However, his action was already too late. Had he initiated the climb at the third GPWS alert, the aircraft would've avoided the mountains.

=== Makedonia Approach ===
As there were no radar in Thessaloniki, the controllers were fully dependent on the position reports from the flight crew as there were no other data that could be used by the controller to crosscheck. Flight 241 repeatedly gave wrong information, somewhat in a confident manner, to the controllers and thus the controllers were not able to retrieve the correct perception on the crew's actual environment and later on were not able to understand the gravity of the situation that the flight crew of Flight 241 were actually facing. The problem was also aggravated with both the controllers and the flight crew's insufficient proficiency in English, the universal language medium for aviation. During the entire conversation between the ATC and the flight crew, the topics were only limited to ordinary routine ATC exchange. Both the controller and the flight crew could not go beyond said exchange to actually understand the rapidly changing critical situation at hand.

However, the crew of Flight 241 had requested route vectoring for at least twice. Those requests alone should have alerted the controllers that there was something wrong on board the flight. The supervisor of the ATC, at the time, should have interpreted the request as radar service. Even so, the controllers' judgements were based on the crew's actions. During the entire flight, the flight crew had repeatedly insisted that they were able to comply with the approach procedure and, for reasons unknown, didn't declare an emergency. Thus, the controller could not intervene and offer military radar assistance to the crew.

=== Oversight failure ===
According to Serhii Lukianov, assistant director of the State Aviation Department of Ukraine, every Ukrainian aircraft that had departed from Ukraine was airworthy, as he stated that all Ukrainian aircraft must meet stringent maintenance requirements and certifications. Ukrainian authority stated that there had been no recorded malfunctions prior to the aircraft's departure from Lviv to Thessaloniki. The last maintenance check was conducted on 11 December, six days before the accident. However, further examination revealed that the No.1 aircraft's navigation receiver (captain side) had failed during the aircraft's approach to Odesa. The maintenance crew had tried to fix the problem, but to no avail. Nevertheless, the aircraft was allowed to fly to Thessaloniki. The decision to continue the flight to Thessaloniki with the aircraft was questionable. The minimum equipment list clearly stated that an aircraft should only be allowed to fly with a non-operative VOR receiver for a ferry flight and only if the malfunctioning VOR receiver was on the co-pilot side, not on the captain side. Thus, the aircraft was regarded as not airworthy by investigators.

=== Conclusion ===
The final report was published approximately 11 months after the accident, on 11 November 1998. Copies of the final report draft were sent to the Ukrainian and Russian investigators in June 1998. The final report listed the following causes of the crash:

1. The failure of the flight crew to adequately plan and execute the approach and missed approach procedure for runway 16 at Makedonia airport.

2. The failure of the flight crew to properly utilize the Makedonia airport radio-navigational aids and aircraft radio equipment I instruments and to interpret the information that was presented.

3. The failure of the flight crew to declare an emergency when they lost their orientation following the missed approach, despite numerous cues alerting them for the aforementioned situation.

4. The captain's failure to achieve maximum performance climb in response to the GPWS alarm signal 30 seconds prior to impact.

5. The lack of command presence, cockpit discipline and resource management which resulted in a disorganized, confused and ultimately dysfunctional flight crew.

6. The company's inadequate oversight. over their flight operations, that allowed for and resulted in scheduling one inadequately prepared and marginally qualified flight crew and an aircraft which did not comply with national and international airworthiness regulations (it had not been issued the Type Certificate with the corresponding Amendment for the international flights), to execute a regular passenger flight with 1 VHF/NAV receiver inoperative.

— Aircraft Accidents Inquiry Council

Investigators issued 20 recommendations, of which 9 were sent to ICAO. Ukrainian Department State of Aviation Transport was asked to evaluate the overall operational system of Lviv Aviation Enterprise, the owner of the Yak-42, and Aerosvit Airlines. The department was also asked to develop a compulsory CFIT training program in the country and that CFIT assessment should be made imperative. CRM training and Line-oriented flight training (LOFT) were also requested to be included in the country's flight safety program. Hellenic Civil Aviation Authority was also urged to develop a mandatory CFIT training program and to provide radar to Thessaloniki airport.

== Aftermath ==
A member of the inquiry committee, Major Spiros Georgopoulos from the Hellenic Air Force, disagreed with the contributing factors of the crash. He opined that the air traffic controller in Thessaloniki had directly caused the crash rather than one of the contributing factors, adding that he felt that the controller didn't prevent the crash by not helping the crew for radar assistance even though it was apparent that the crew had lost their orientation.

In 1998, the Ukrainian government sent a letter of protest to the Greek Foreign Ministry following the grounding of an Aerosvit Boeing 737-200 aircraft in Thessaloniki. The grounding had been ordered by the Greek court due to payment issues of the victims' compensation by Aerosvit. Ukrainian authorities stated that the grounding was not in accordance with international norm and requested an official explanation on the incident.

In year 2000, following lawsuits that had been filed by 29 families of the victims, two of the air traffic controllers were convicted of manslaughter by Greek court. Both controllers initially had been cleared from any fault by the Greek government. They were later sentenced to 4 years and 4 months in prison. Thessaloniki court also asked Lviv Airlines to compensate $1.6 million to each of the families of two passengers of Flight 241. Lviv Airlines, as the owner of the aircraft, refused to pay the compensation, stating that the ruling was still pending.

The Greek government unveiled a memorial for the victims of the crash in year 2000. A small chapel was later built on the site.

== See also ==
- Air navigation
- Situation awareness
- Varig Flight 254, a crash in Brazil in which the crew flew the aircraft in an opposite direction from the route they were supposed to take.
