= CGAC =

CGAC may refer to:

- China General Aviation Corporation - A former Chinese airline
- Galicia Contemporary Art Centre - A museum in Galicia
- CGA Computer - A software security company whose flagship product, Top Secret, was acquired by Computer Associates in 1985
