= China General Aviation =

Chinese airline, 1987–1997

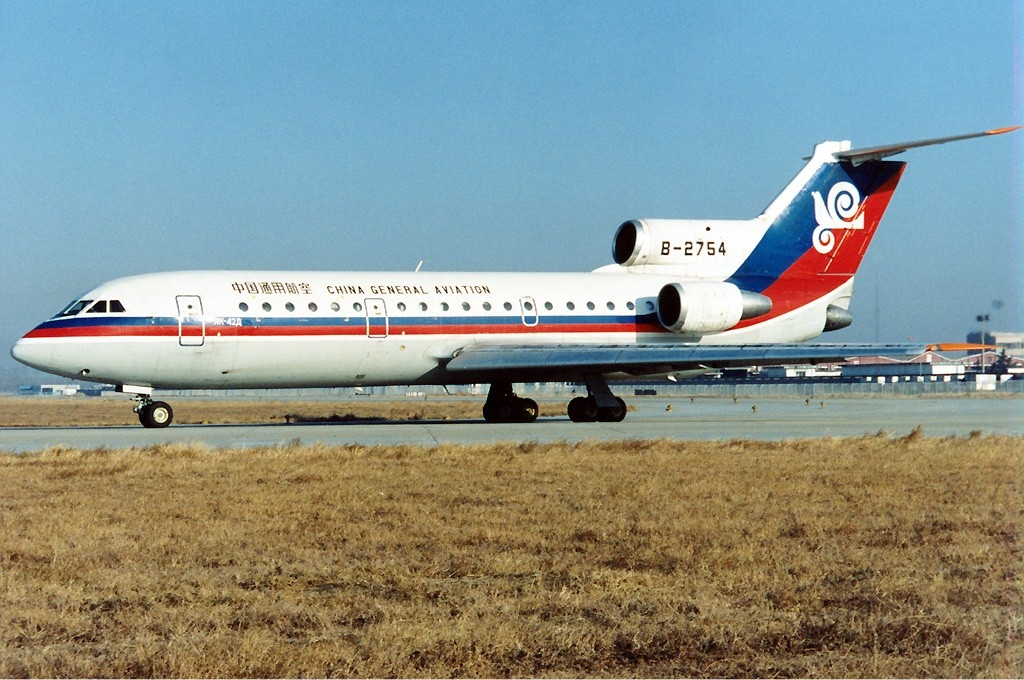
- A China General Aviation Yakovlev Yak-42
IATA	ICAO	Call sign
GP	CTH	TONGHANG
- Commenced operations: 1987
- Ceased operations: October 1998 (merged into China Eastern Airlines)
- Operating bases: Taiyuan Wusu International Airport
- Fleet size: See Fleet below
- Headquarters: Taiyuan, China
- Key people: Zhang Changjing (President); Wan Z Yi (Vice-president)
- Employees: 3,791 (1998)

China General Aviation (Corporation - CGAC) was an airline based in Taiyuan Wusu International Airport, China. It operated a fleet of 8 Yakovlev Yak-42D and later 3 Boeing 737-300 aircraft. It was acquired by China Eastern Airlines in 1997.

== Code data ==
- IATA Code: GP
- ICAO Code: CTH
- Callsign: TONGHANG

== Fleet ==
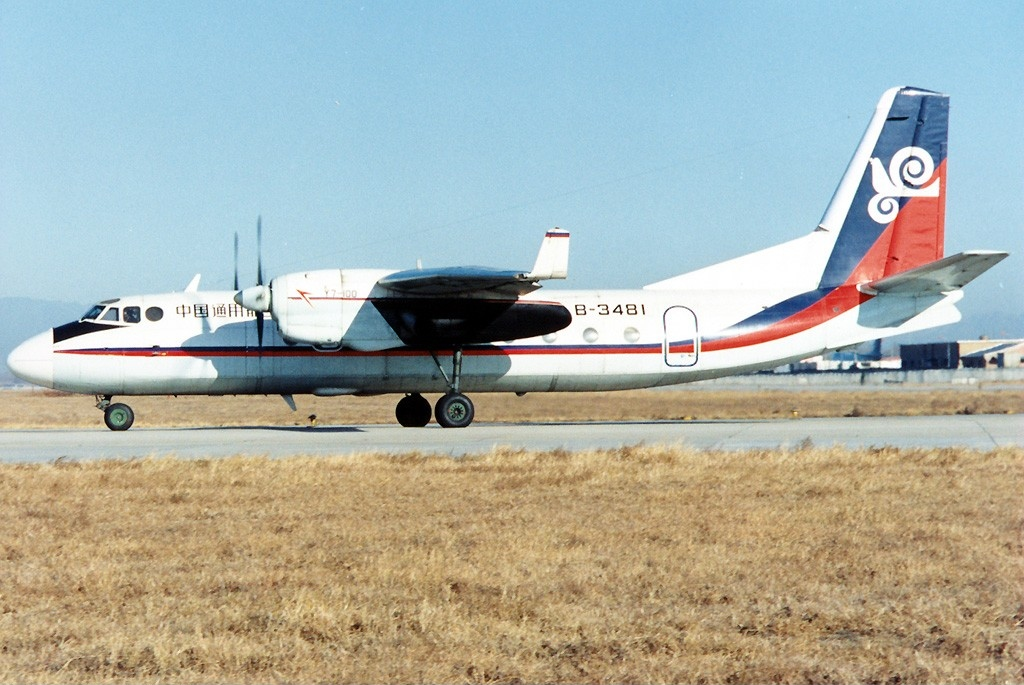
A China General Aviation Xian Y-7-100.

Throughout the airline's operation, China General Aviation operated the following aircraft:

Aircraft	Total	Introduced	Retired	Notes
Antonov An-2	Unknown	Unknown	1998	
Antonov An-12	1	1987	1992	
Antonov An-30	2	1988	1998	
Beechcraft King Air	Unknown	Unknown	1998	
Bell 212	Unknown	Unknown	1998	
Boeing 737-300	3	1997	1998	B-2977, B-2978, B-2979; Its 3 Boeing 737-300 aircraft were transferred to China Eastern Airlines.
De Havilland Canada DHC-6	8	1987	1998	
Ilyushin Il-14	Unknown	Unknown	1998	
Yakovlev Yak-42D	8	1992	1998	B-2751, B-2752, B-2753, B-2754, B-2755, B-2756, B-2757, B-2758
Yunshuji Y-7-100	3	Unknown	Unknown	

== Accidents and incidents ==
- On July 31, 1992, China General Aviation Flight 7552 crashed into a pond past the runway after takeoff from Nanjing Dajiaochang Airport. 8 of the 10 crew members and 100 of the 116 passengers died.
