= Aeroflot Flight 8175 =

1990 aviation accident in the Soviet Union

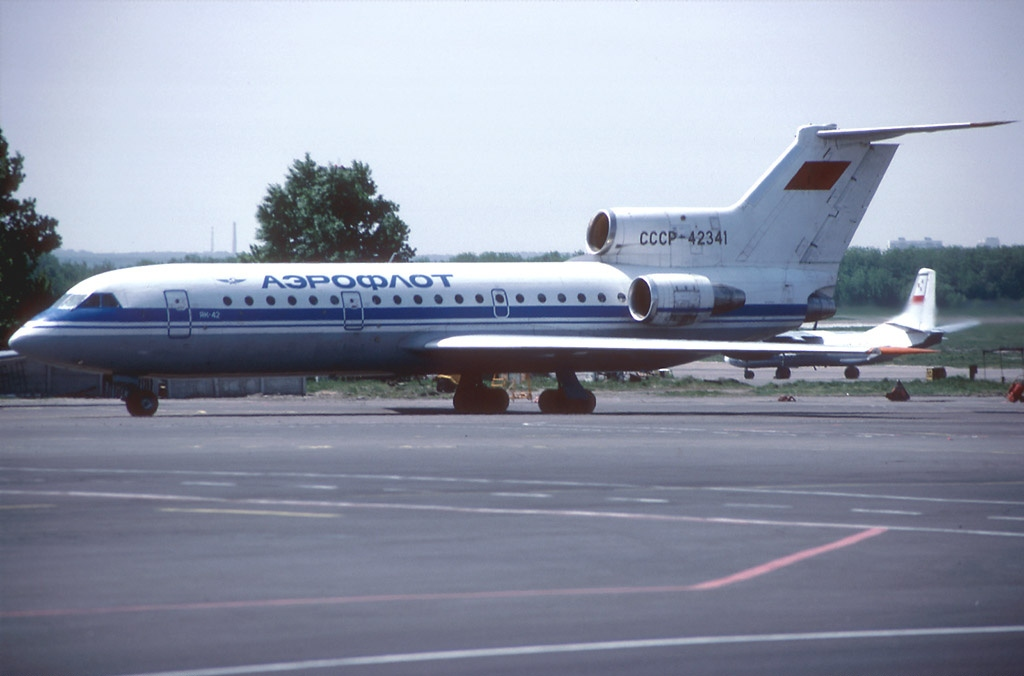
- An Aeroflot Yakovlev Yak-42 similar to the one that was involved

Accident
- Date: 14 September 1990
- Summary: Controlled flight into terrain during approach, pilot error
- Site: 1.7 km west of Koltsovo International Airport, Sverdlovsk, Sverdlovsk Oblast, Soviet Union

Aircraft
- Aircraft type: Yakovlev Yak-42
- Operator: Aeroflot
- IATA flight No.: SU8175
- ICAO flight No.: AFL8175
- Call sign: AEROFLOT 8175
- Registration: CCCP-42351
- Flight origin: Volgograd International Airport, Volgograd, Volgograd Oblast, Soviet Union
- Destination: Koltsovo International Airport, Sverdlovsk, Sverdlovsk Oblast, Soviet Union
- Occupants: 129
- Passengers: 124
- Crew: 5
- Fatalities: 4
- Injuries: 40
- Survivors: 125

Aeroflot Flight 8175 was a scheduled passenger flight from Volgograd, Volgograd Oblast , to Sverdlovsk, Sverdlovsk Oblast. On 14 September 1990, the plane struck trees and broke up in a wooded area, killing four on board. The aircraft stopped 381 m from the point of the first contact with obstacles. The fuselage broke in two between frames 31 and 32, with the front section turning 51° relative to the rear section. In the area of frame 10, the fuselage was deformed with a deviation of the pilot's cabin to the left by 2-3° from the aircraft axis. Part of the tail and engine #2 separated.

The accident was officially reported by Russian president Boris Yeltsin himself to the Russian Parliament.

== Background ==
=== Aircraft ===
The aircraft involved was a Yakovlev Yak-42, manufactured in 1988 and registered as CCCP-42351. It was powered by Lotarev D-36 engines. Before the incident, the plane had acquired 4509 hours of airframe with 2824 cycles.

=== Crew member ===
Captain: Viktor Nikolaevich Azarov

Co-pilot: Andrey Andreev

Flight engineer: Nikolai Zemtsov

Flight attendant: Raisa Goretskaya

There was one more unamed flight attendant.

Viktor Nikolaevich Azarov initially did not board the flight; instead, it was another captain named Valery Panov. The switch was made because Panov's wife broke her leg.

== Accident ==
The flight was uneventful until the descent. The plane descended from an altitude of 9100 meters (30000 ft) at a distance of 140 km (87 miles) from Koltsovo airport on a course by a right turn to the fourth turn. The landing approach was carried out at night in conditions of rain, stratus, and stratocumulus clouds of 10 points with a height of 150 m and visibility of 4000 m. During the descent, the crew switched to communication with the approach controller, who, at a distance of 65 km, allowed the descent to 1800 m (5905 ft) by the fourth turn. To fit into the approach pattern, the crew had to maintain a vertical speed of 15–20 m/s. However, a strong tailwind at all altitudes, icing up to an altitude of 2000 m (6500 ft), and electrification did not allow maintaining this vertical speed, as a result of which the pilot in command decided to turn left at a distance of 65 km to delay the descent maneuver. The intentional deviation from the approach pattern was made with the passivity of the controller. After the left turn, the actual flight altitude was 3700 m (12150 ft) with a calculated altitude of 1,800 m (5905 ft), and the lateral deviation was 8 km. The flight course changed sequentially to 58°, 38°, 28°, and 20°. While at an altitude of 3000 (9850 ft) m, the crew misinformed the controller by reporting that they had reached an altitude of 1800 m (5905 ft).

The aircraft crossed the extension of the runway axis at a distance of about 35 km and continued to fly with a left deviation outside the approach pattern and at an altitude significantly greater than the established descent trajectory. The crew then switched to communication with the circuit controller, also reporting to him the flight altitude of 1800 (5905 ft) m with an actual altitude of 2500 m (8200 ft). The controller cleared the first turn on a course of 120° with a descent to 600 m (2000 ft). At a distance of 25 km, to the left of the landing course of 8 km, the crew began a right turn, continuing the descent. The controller permitted descent to 500 m (1640 ft) and to switch to communication with the landing controller.

At the established line, the crew did not extend the landing gear and flaps by 20°. At a distance of 12 km from the runway threshold, the aircraft was outside the approach pattern, 1,220 m to the left of the landing line with 490 km/h (265 knots) [According to the flight manual, the speed should be 360 km/h (194 knots)]. The controller instructed to set the heading to 100°. The crew began a right turn to enter the landing line. The glide path entry point was passed at an altitude of 540 m (1770 ft) instead of the established 500 m and with a course deviation of up to 260 m. At an altitude of 450 m (1480 ft) with an indicated airspeed of 390 km/h (210 knots), the landing gear is extended. The controller again gave the command to take a heading of 100°. The crew carried it out after 8 seconds, setting a heading of 105°. At a distance of 10 km, the deviation to the left was 654 m. Then the dispatcher transmitted: "Maintain heading 100, distance 8.5, left of landing 600, on glide path." At a distance of 8 km, the lateral deviation was 452 m. At a distance of 7 km, left of the glide path 200 m, flaps were extended to 20°. The crew continued to descend with a vertical speed of up to 8 m/s at flight idle power. The aircraft crossed the glide path line in altitude and continued to descend slightly below it.

The situation became difficult at a distance of 6,000 m, when the crew performed a turn to eliminate the lateral deviation and during the turn extended the flaps to 45°. At this time, the ACS lateral channel was automatically switched off, the "Roll is high", "ACS roll channel failure," and "Speed is high" alarms were triggered. At the same time, the pilot in command was simultaneously performing actions to recognize the reasons for the ACS shutdown and make an appropriate decision, detect the "Speed is high" signal, control the aircraft to maintain the course and glide path, and counter the nose-down moment from the additional flaps extension. As a result, the aircraft deviated to the left by 250 m and went below the glide path by 30–40 m (100–130 ft).

A pulling force of 15–25 kg arose on the control column due to the aircraft's imbalance. The controller instructed to take a course of 90°, for which the pilot in command used the ACS autopilot handle to enter a left bank of 22°. The controller transmitted: "distance 5.5, course 88, intersecting the landing, to the right 50, below the glide path 10, reduce." Before passing the outer marker, the aircraft crossed the final approach line and was 50 m to the right of it at a distance of 5 km from the runway threshold. The crew began a left turn. At the same time, the "high bank" alarm was activated. The controller transmitted: "course 90". The "ACS roll channel failure" and "High speed" alarms were activated. The PIC abruptly pulled the control column toward himself and switched off the ACSS using the button on the control column. The aircraft passed the outer marker beam with a deviation of 200 m to the left and above the glide path. The controller transmitted: "351, far, crossed the landing path, 70 to the left of the landing path, course 92". After passing the outer marker, there were overload fluctuations of up to 1.3 units with a stabilizer angle of -6°. Due to an imbalance, the aircraft acquired excessive vertical speed, and after passing the outer marker was in a non-landing position below the glide path. On a lateral deviation to the left of 270 m, the SSOS and VPR alarms were triggered. Having needed to go around, the crew continued the landing approach with a high vertical rate of descent, bank, and lateral deviation. The crew reported readiness for landing. The controller transmitted: "Additional landing, heading 94, distance 2.5, to the left of landing 100, below glide path 25, reduce descent." The crew confirmed. At an altitude of 80 m (260 ft), the pilot in command, having established visual contact with ground reference points, assessed the aircraft’s position as non-landing and began to formulate a decision to go around. This is indicated by a decrease in vertical speed to 2.5 m/s and an energetic right turn onto the landing course.

The controller transmitted: "Proceed without descending." At this time, at an altitude of 60 m (200 ft), the SSOS and the VPR signal were activated for the second time. The flight engineer said: "Leaving, commander." The decision to go around was made late. The control wheel was fully engaged. The engine mode was increased to takeoff. However, the presence of a high vertical speed of descent and an extremely low flight altitude led to the aircraft colliding with trees at an altitude of 20 m (65 ft), 2,000 m from the runway. Continuing to descend, the aircraft collided with trees. After leaving the forest, it collided with the ground in a field 1,700 m from the runway. Before the first touchdown, the aircraft was moving with a right bank of 8°, with a slip on the right wing and a pitch angle of at least 15°, which was created by the crew abruptly pulling the control column "backwards".

== Victims ==
The plane was carrying 124 passengers and 5 crew members whom 3 of the passengers, the flight engineer, died, and also injuring 40 people.

	Passenger	Crew	Total
Survived	121	4	125
Perished	3	1	4

== See also ==
- Aeroflot Flight 7841, a passenger plane, crashed into a forest

Crashed into a wooded area/forest during approach:

- Northwest Airlink Flight 5719
- American Airlines Flight 965
- Corporate Airlines Flight 5966
- Korean Air Flight 801
