= China General Aviation Flight 7552 =

1992 passenger plane crash in Nanjing, China

Coordinates: 31°59′54″N 118°48′50″E

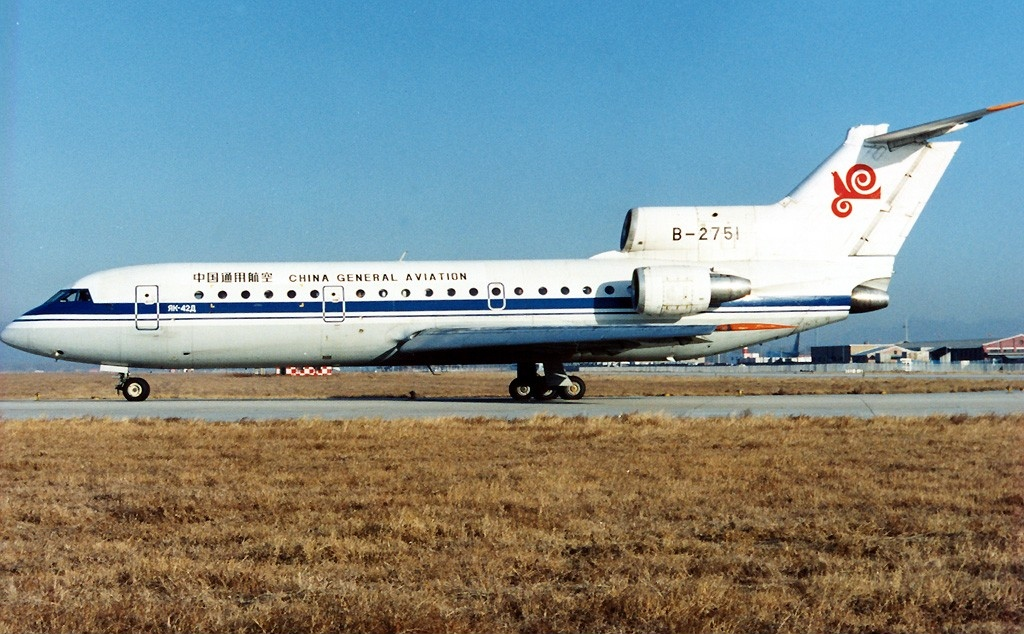
- A China General Aviation Yak-42 similar to the one involved

Accident
- Date: 31 July 1992
- Summary: Runway overrun due to pilot error during take-off
- Site: near Nanjing Dajiaochang Airport, Nanjing, Jiangsu, China

Aircraft
- Aircraft type: Yakovlev Yak-42D
- Operator: China General Aviation
- IATA flight No.: GP7552
- ICAO flight No.: CTH7552
- Call sign: TONGHANG 7552
- Registration: B-2755
- Flight origin: Nanjing Dajiaochang Airport, Jiangsu, China
- Destination: Xiamen Gaoqi International Airport, Xiamen, Fujian, China
- Occupants: 126
- Passengers: 116
- Crew: 10
- Fatalities: 108
- Injuries: 18
- Survivors: 18

China General Aviation Flight 7552 was a China General Aviation flight from Nanjing Dajiaochang Airport to Xiamen Gaoqi International Airport. On July 31, 1992, the Yakovlev Yak-42D overran runway 06 during takeoff and impacted an embankment at 210 kilometres per hour (110 kn; 130 mph), 420 metres (1,380 ft) from the threshold.

== Aircraft ==
The aircraft was manufactured by the Saratov Aviation Plant on January 2, 1992, and was delivered to China General Aviation in the same month.

== Accident ==
Flight GP7552 was a passenger flight from Nanking to Xiamen. There were 116 passengers and 10 crew members. At about 3:05 pm the aircraft headed for the runway 06 and, after a minute delay, started its take-off roll. The Yak-42 started to lift off the ground and began to climb, however the aircraft failed to respond to controls and slammed back down onto the runway. The takeoff was aborted and the pilots initiated an emergency braking procedure, however the aircraft was unable to stop with the remaining runway distance.

The aircraft then exited the runway, and continued rolling for on the ground 420–600 metres (1,380–1,970 ft). The aircraft then crashed into a two-meter (6.6-foot) fence, a drainage ditch and an embankment and exploded. The fuselage broke into three parts, after which a post-crash fire erupted. Part of the wreckage fell into a nearby pond. 8 of the 10 crew members and 100 of the 116 passengers died. (Note: The number of fatalities was reported as 107 by Chinese media. Most international organizations and media reported 108 fatalities.)

== Investigation ==
Investigators determined that the crew did not prepare the flight according to the airline's procedures and did not follow the pre-takeoff checklist. The aircraft was unable to take off because the elevator trim was set in a landing configuration.

== See also ==
- Thai Airways International Flight 311 – another aviation accident that occurred the same day.
- Delta Air Lines Flight 1141
- Northwest Airlines Flight 255
- Spanair Flight 5022
- 2011 Lokomotiv Yaroslavl plane crash
- Fine Air Flight 101
