= Volodymyr Lobas =

Ukrainian footballer (born 1970)

Personal information
- Full name: Volodymyr Demydovych Lobas
- Date of birth: 6 March 1970 (age 56)
- Place of birth: Kyiv, Ukrainian SSR
- Height: 1.75 m (5 ft 9 in)
- Positions: Forward; midfielder

Team information
- Current team: FC Merani Martvili (manager)

Senior career*
Years	Team	Apps	(Gls)
1987–1989	Dynamo Kyiv	0	(0)
1990	Dynamo Bila Tserkva	34	(3)
1991	Metalist Kharkiv	0	(0)
1991	Avanhard Rivne	25	(3)
1992	Dynamo-2 Kyiv	36	(11)
1993–1995	Nyva Ternopil	73	(7)
1995–1996	CSKA-Borysfen Kyiv	4	(0)
1996	Zhemchuzhina Sochi	9	(0)
1996	Energiya-Tekstilshchik Kamyshin	4	(0)
1997–1998	Panserraikos		
1999–2000	Neapoli Thessaloniki		
2000–2001	Acharnaikos		
2001–2002	Kozani		
2002–2003	Odysseas Kordelio		

Managerial career
- 2014–: FC Merani Martvili
- * Club domestic league appearances and goals

Volodymyr Demydovych Lobas (Ukrainian: Володимир Демидович Лобас; born 6 March 1970 in Kiev) is a Ukrainian football coach and a former player who manages FC Merani Martvili.

He played for the main squad of Dynamo Kyiv in the USSR Federation Cup.

== Personal ==
In 1997 his wife and their two children died in Aerosvit Flight 241 tragedy.
