= Nanjing Dajiaochang Airport =

Former airport of Nanjing, Jiangsu, China (1934–2015)

Nanjing Dajiaochang Airport 南京大校场机场
- IATA: NKG (Note: The airport codes have been reassigned to Nanjing Lukou International Airport.); ICAO: Z08T (Note: The airport codes have been reassigned to Nanjing Lukou International Airport.)

Summary
- Airport type: Defunct
- Serves: Nanjing
- Location: Yuhuatai, Nanjing, Jiangsu, China
- Opened: 1934
- Closed: 30 July 2015
- Passenger services ceased: 28 June 1997
- Hub for: China Northwest Airlines (1989–1997)
- Coordinates: 31°59′54″N 118°48′50″E

Map
- Location of airport in Jiangsu

Runways
Direction	Length		Surface
Direction	m	ft	Surface
06/24	2,200	7,218	Concrete (Closed)

Nanjing Dajiaochang Airport
- Simplified Chinese: 南京大校场机场
- Traditional Chinese: 南京大校場機場
Transcriptions
Standard Mandarin
- Hanyu Pinyin: Nánjīng Dàjiàochǎng Jīchǎng

Nanjing Dajiaochang Airport was an airport that served Nanjing, the capital of East China's Jiangsu province. It is located 6.2 kilometres (3.9 mi) south of Xinjiekou, the center of Nanjing, and is surrounded on three sides by the Qinhuai River.

On 28 June 1997, Nanjing Lukou International Airport was opened and all commercial flights were transferred to the new airport. Dajiaochang Airport remained in use as a military air base. On 8 August 2012, construction began for Nanjing Luhe Airport. After Luhe Airport was opened in July 2015 and the Nanjing Air Base transferred to the new airport, Dajiaochang Airport was closed on 30 July 2015. It will be redeveloped into a commercial and residential area, and its historic runway will be conserved as a public open space. Although that The Terminal building and Air Traffic Control tower still exist today.

== Facilities ==
Since its opening in 1934, Nanjing Dajiaochang Airport has been expanded more than ten times. As of 1999 the airport had a runway that was 2,200 meters long, 60 meters wide, and 46 centimeters thick, capable of handling the Boeing 737 and 757. It occupied an area of 2,720,000 square metres (29,300,000 sq ft).

== History ==
In 1367 Zhu Yuanzhang, the founding emperor of the Ming Dynasty, established his capital in Nanjing and built a military training ground in the area that the airport now occupies. The area has since been called Dajiaochang, meaning "big training ground".

=== Republic of China era ===
Dajiaochang Airport was one of the largest air bases of the Republic of China era. It was first built in April 1931 for the Central Aviation School of China, which was soon moved to Hangzhou Jianqiao Airport. In 1934 Dajiaochang was converted to a military air base with an 800-meter runway. It was further expanded in 1935 and 1936.

During the War of Resistance-World War II, Dajiaochang and Jurong Airbase served as primary air force bases of the Chinese Air Force in the defense of Nanjing and the support of the Battle of Shanghai; the Japanese army took over the airport when Nanjing fell in December 1937. After the surrender of Japan in 1945, the Republic of China government expanded the airport, lengthening its runway to 1,200 meters. After a plane carrying American General George Marshall was damaged at Dajiaochang Airport during landing, in 1947 the airport was expanded again, with a concrete runway that was 2,200 meters long and 45 meters wide.

=== People's Republic of China era ===
In April 1949 Dajiaochang Airport was taken over by the People's Liberation Army of the Chinese Communist Party and became an air base of the Nanjing Military Region of the newly established People's Republic of China. The airport was again expanded in 1954.

In July 1956 Dajiaochang Airport became a dual-use military and public airport when all civil flights serving Nanjing were transferred here from the old Ming Palace Airport. On 28 June 1997, Nanjing Lukou International Airport was opened and all civil flights were transferred to the new airport. The final civil flight departed Dajiaochang Airport on 30 June.

With the rapid expansion of the city of Nanjing, the military Dajiaochang Airport, originally far from the city, is surrounded by the urban area and increasingly restricting its development. Since 2003 the local government and the military have been in talks on relocating the air base. In January 2006 a site for the new airport was determined and the project received approvals from the State Council and the Central Military Commission in January 2009. On 8 August 2012, construction for the new Nanjing Luhe Airport was started in suburban Luhe District north of the Yangtze. On 30 July 2015, the airport was permanently closed after the military air base was transferred to the Luhe Airport. A 10-square-kilometre (3.9 sq mi) area encompassing Dajiaochang Airport will be redeveloped into a commercial and residential area. Its historic runway will be conserved as a public open space.

== Accidents and incidents ==
On 31 July 1992, the China General Aviation Flight 7552 bound for Xiamen crashed soon after taking off from Dajiaochang Airport. The Soviet-made Yakovlev 42D crashed into a pond 600 meters past the runway at 15:12 and caught fire, killing 8 of the 10 crew members and 100 of the 116 passengers.

== See also ==
- List of airports in China
- List of People's Liberation Army Air Force airbases
