= Aeroflot Flight 8641 =

1982 aviation accident

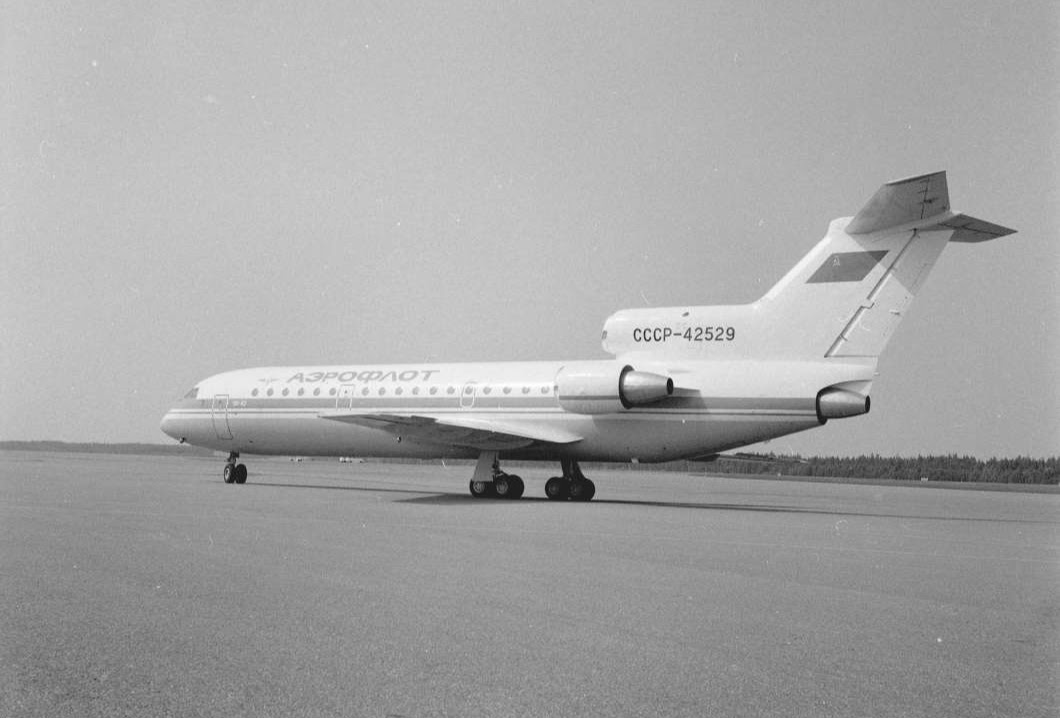
- CCCP-42529, the aircraft involved in the accident

Accident
- Date: 28 June 1982
- Summary: Jackscrew failure due to metal fatigue; design flaw
- Site: Near Mazyr, Byelorussian SSR, Soviet Union; 52°0′N 29°13′E

Aircraft
- Aircraft type: Yakovlev Yak-42
- Operator: Aeroflot
- IATA flight No.: SU8641
- ICAO flight No.: AFL8641
- Call sign: AEROFLOT 8641
- Registration: СССР-42529
- Flight origin: Pulkovo Airport, Leningrad, Russian SFSR, Soviet Union
- Destination: Kiev (now Kyiv)-Zhuliany International Airport, Kiev, Ukrainian SSR, Soviet Union
- Occupants: 132
- Passengers: 124
- Crew: 8
- Fatalities: 132
- Survivors: 0

Aeroflot Flight 8641 was a Yakovlev Yak-42 airliner on a domestic scheduled passenger flight from Leningrad (now Saint Petersburg) to Kiev (now Kyiv). On 28 June 1982, the flight crashed south of Mazyr, Byelorussian SSR, killing all 132 people on board. The accident was both the first and deadliest crash of a Yakovlev Yak-42, and remains the deadliest aviation accident in Belarus.

The cause was a failure of the jackscrew controlling the horizontal stabilizer due to a design flaw.

== Aircraft and crew ==
The Yakovlev Yak-42 involved in the accident was registered to Aeroflot as СССР-42529. The aircraft made its maiden flight on 21 April 1981 and was delivered to the Ministry of Civil Aviation on 1 June 1981. At the time of the accident, it had 795 flight hours and 496 takeoff and landing cycles.

All 124 passenger seats were filled, 11 were children. The flight crew consisted of:

- Captain Vyacheslav Nikolaevich Musinskiy
- Co-pilot Alexander Sergeevich Stigariev
- Flight engineer Nikolai Semyonovich Vinogradov
- Navigator-trainee Viktor Ivanovich Kedrov
- Flight Attendant Anna Nikolaevna Sheykina
- Flight Attendant Tamara Mikhailovna Vasishcheva
- Flight Attendant Olga Pavlovna Pavlova
- Flight Attendant Yury Borisovich Ryabov

== Sequence of events ==
The aircraft took off from Pulkovo Airport at 9:01 MSK - Moscow Time, having been delayed one minute because of a late passenger. At 10:45 MSK it entered the zone of Kiev/Boryspil air traffic control Center. The crew started the landing checklist at 10:48:01. At 10:48:58 the crew informed the air traffic controller they reached the planned top of descent point, the controller clearing them for descent to 7,800 metres (25,600 ft). The crew confirmed the flight path; no further communications were heard from Flight 8641.

At 10:51:20 MSK the autopilot gradually brought about a horizontal stabilizer angle of up 0.3° to begin descent. At 10:51:30 the stabilizer angle sharply increased, exceeding the 2° limit within half a second. The sudden change resulted in a negative g-force of -1.5 g, but the autopilot adjusted the controls to lower it to -0.6 g. The stabilizer did not respond to commands and the plane continued diving, the autopilot switched off after 3 seconds. The pilots pulled back on the yoke trying to level out the airplane, but it continued in a steep dive; soon it rolled 35° left and the dive achieved 50° nose down. As it rolled counterclockwise with over -2 g of overload, the aircraft disintegrated at 10:51:50 at an altitude of 5,700 metres (18,700 ft) and an indicated speed of 810 km/h (440 kn; 500 mph).

The wreckage was found on the outskirts of Verbavychi village, 10 kilometres (6.2 mi) southeast of the district center Naroulia (itself being further 18 km south/west of the larger Mozyr which is often listed.) Fragments of the plane were scattered across an area of 6.5 by 3.5 kilometres (4.0 by 2.2 mi). All 132 people on board perished.

== Cause ==
The cause was determined to be a failure of the jackscrew mechanism in the aircraft's tail due to metal fatigue, which resulted from flaws in the Yak-42's design. The investigation concluded that among the causes of the crash were poor maintenance, as well as the stabilizer not meeting aviation standards. Three engineers who signed the jackscrew drawings were convicted.

As for the official cause of the crash: "the spontaneous movement of the stabilizer was due to disconnection in flight of the jackscrew assembly due to the almost complete deterioration of the 42M5180-42 thread-nuts due to structural imperfections in the mechanism." Due to the accident, all Yak-42s were withdrawn from service until the design defect was rectified in October 1984.

In 2021, on the 39th anniversary of the tragedy, a memorial to the victims of the disaster was erected at the aircraft crash site.

In 2026, the memorial website “Leningrad – Kyiv: An Interrupted Flight” was launched, featuring biographies of the victims, documents from the investigation and court proceedings, as well as eyewitness accounts of the tragedy.

== See also ==
- Alaska Airlines Flight 261 – a MD-83 accident in 2000 also resulting from a jackscrew failure
- American Airlines Flight 96 and Turkish Airlines Flight 981 - similar accidents involving in-flight structural failure due to design flaws, in which the latter contributed to the respective type grounding
