= Aircraft vectoring =

Navigation service provided to aircraft by air traffic control

Aircraft vectoring is a navigation service provided to aircraft by air traffic control. The controller decides on a particular airfield traffic pattern for the aircraft to fly, composed of specific legs or vectors. The aircraft then follows this pattern when the controller instructs the pilot to fly specific headings at appropriate times.

Vectoring is used to separate aircraft by a specified distance, to aid the navigation of flights, and to guide arriving aircraft to a position from which they can continue their final approach to land under the guidance of an approach procedure published by the FAA.

Vectoring is the provision of navigational guidance to aircraft in the form of specific headings, based on the use of an ATS surveillance system. Aircraft may be vectored to:

- apply ATS surveillance system separation
- achieve an expeditious flow of aircraft
- maximise use of available airspace
- comply with noise abatement procedures
- avoid areas of known hazardous weather or known severe turbulence.
- adjust the arrival sequence
- establish the aircraft on final approach track of a pilot-interpreted approach
- maneuver an aircraft into a suitable position below the clouds near an aerodrome for a visual approach and landing.

The nature of Terminal area operations means that vectoring plays a significant part in the way controllers' process traffic.

In addition to separation and sequencing, vectoring is often used in training environments to familiarize new pilots with air traffic control instructions and radio phraseology. Vectoring is also employed in cases of emergency, such as guiding aircraft suffering instrument failures toward a safe landing area. In modern air traffic management systems, radar vectoring is increasingly complemented by Performance-Based Navigation (PBN) procedures, which reduce the need for tactical vectoring while still allowing controllers to intervene when traffic complexity or weather requires it.
