= Roman Stepanovych Kopystiansky =

Ukrainian petroleum geologist (1925–2013)

Roman Kopystianskyi
- Роман Копистянський
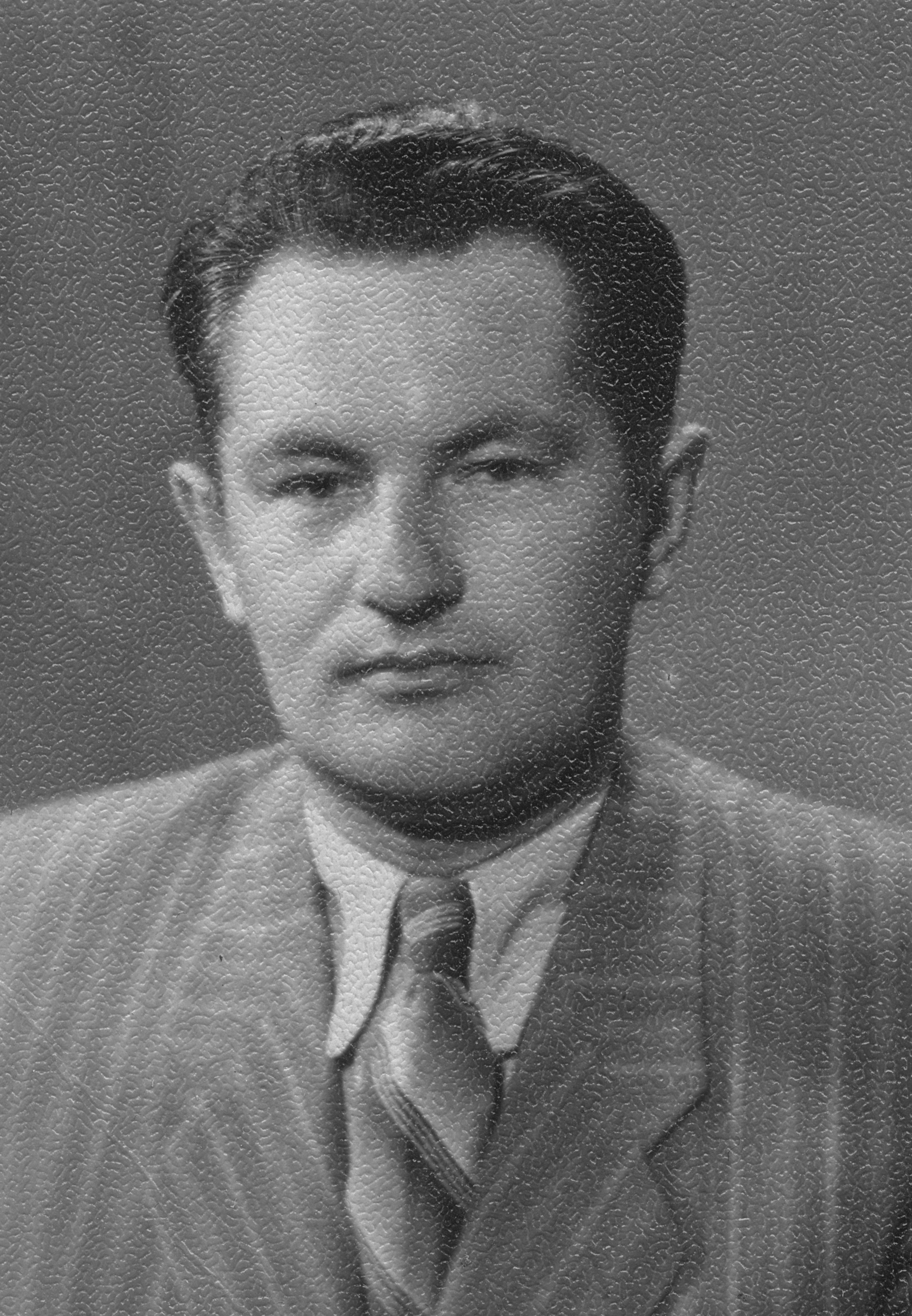
- Roman Kopystiansky
- Born: Roman Stepanovych Kopystiansky; 24 November 1925; Vilshany, near Przemyśl, Poland
- Died: 8 September 2013 (aged 87); Lviv, Ukraine
- Resting place: Lychakiv Cemetery, field No. 70
- Education: Lviv Polytechnic Institute
- Known for: Research on rock fracturing and the reservoir properties of oil- and gas-bearing formations
- Spouse: Nonna Kopystianska
- Children: Igor Kopystiansky
- Scientific career
- Fields: Petroleum geology, tectonophysics, geomechanics
- Workplaces: Institute of Geology and Geochemistry of Combustible Minerals of the National Academy of Sciences of Ukraine
- Academic advisors: Volodymyr Porfiryev

Roman Stepanovych Kopystiansky (Ukrainian: Роман Степанович Копистянський; 24 November 1925 – 8 September 2013) was a Ukrainian petroleum geologist who studied the Carpathian oil and gas province. His research focused on rock fracturing, tectonophysics, geomechanics and the reservoir properties of oil- and gas-bearing formations. He held the degree of Doctor of Geological and Mineralogical Sciences.

== Early life and education ==
Kopystianskyi was born on 24 November 1925 in the village of Vilshany near Przemyśl, Poland, into the family of a priest who served as the parish priest of the local church. He completed primary school in his native village and attended secondary school in Przemyśl. During the Second World War, he continued his education in Drohobych.

In 1945, his mother and sisters were killed in their native village, while Kopystianskyi, his brother and their father survived.

In 1944, he began working in Lviv as a geological collector for the Ukrnaftorozvidka exploration trust while attending an evening secondary school. He subsequently entered the petroleum faculty of the Lviv Polytechnic Institute, now Lviv Polytechnic National University. During university holidays, he worked for geological exploration organisations.

Kopystianskyi graduated from the Lviv Polytechnic Institute in 1951 and began postgraduate study at the Institute of Geology of Mineral Resources of the Academy of Sciences of the Ukrainian SSR. The institute later became the Institute of Geology and Geochemistry of Combustible Minerals of the National Academy of Sciences of Ukraine. His academic supervisor was the geologist and academician Volodymyr Porfiryev.

In 1956, he defended his Candidate of Sciences dissertation, entitled Трещиноватость и её роль в процессе формирования Бориславского нефтяного месторождения (“Rock fracturing and its role in the formation of the Boryslav oil field”). After completing the dissertation, he remained at the institute, where he conducted most of his subsequent scientific work.

In 1975, Kopystianskyi defended his doctoral dissertation, Геологические аспекты изучения проблемы трещиноватости горных пород в нефтегазовой геологии (на примере Карпатской нефтегазоносной провинции) (“Geological aspects of the study of rock fracturing in petroleum geology: the Carpathian oil and gas province as an example”).

== Scientific career ==
Kopystianskyi's research concerned methods of improving the exploration and prospecting of hydrocarbon deposits, the geological and structural-tectonic development of the Carpathian region, rock fracturing and the processes involved in the formation of oil and gas fields.

He studied the reservoir properties of oil- and gas-bearing formations at depths of approximately 4.5 to 7 kilometres (2.8 to 4.3 mi), changes in rock fracturing with depth, the stress state of rock formations, and the reservoir and sealing properties of deeply buried strata. He also developed a tectonophysical approach to predicting zones of compaction and decompaction in reservoir rocks.

His interdisciplinary research in geology and physics was carried out in the institute's geomechanics laboratory, which he headed during the final decades of his scientific career. He participated in Soviet scientific conferences on fractured reservoirs and the petroleum potential of great depths, including conferences held in Moscow and Leningrad in 1961, 1965 and 1980.

Kopystianskyi was a member of two specialised academic councils responsible for the examination of dissertations, as well as a member of the institute's academic council. He reviewed scientific and industrial reports and served as an official opponent during dissertation defences.

== Scientific contribution and influence ==
Independent geological literature has identified Kopystianskyi as one of the researchers who made a major contribution to the study of the reservoir properties of sedimentary rocks at great depths.

His investigations in the Carpathian Foredeep established that fracture orientation was controlled not only by the direction of tectonic stress but also by the lithological composition of the rocks. His data demonstrated different characteristic fracture orientations in sandstones, mudstones and marls, as well as a relationship between fracture spacing and bed thickness.

A specialist monograph on carbonate oil and gas reservoirs included Kopystianskyi's 1978 book among the principal works presenting methodological and theoretical research on the distribution of carbonate reservoirs.

Kopystianskyi's findings continued to be reproduced in later university teaching literature. A 2009 petroleum-lithology textbook included his data on the relationship between fracture spacing and the thickness of sandstone and siltstone beds in the Carpathian flysch formations.

Later research also credited his tectonophysical analysis with identifying zones of enhanced reservoir properties caused by rock failure and irreversible volumetric deformation.

== Selected works ==
=== Books and monographs ===
- Копистянський, Р. С. Значення тріщинуватості порід у формуванні нафтових родовищ Радянських Карпат [The significance of rock fracturing in the formation of oil fields in the Soviet Carpathians]. Kyiv: Publishing House of the Academy of Sciences of the Ukrainian SSR, 1959. 74 pp.
- Копистянський, Р. С. Проблема тріщинуватості порід у нафтовій геології [The problem of rock fracturing in petroleum geology]. Kyiv: Naukova Dumka, 1968. 158 pp.
- Копыстянский, Р. С. Трещиноватость горных пород и её значение в нефтегазовой геологии: на примере Карпатского региона [Rock fracturing and its significance in petroleum geology: the Carpathian region as an example]. Kyiv: Naukova Dumka, 1978. 215 pp.
- Gurzhii, D. V.; Gabinet, M. P.; Kiselyov, A. E.; Kopystianskyi, R. S.; et al. Литология и породы-коллекторы на больших глубинах в нефтегазоносных провинциях Украины [Lithology and reservoir rocks at great depths in the petroleum provinces of Ukraine]. Kyiv: Naukova Dumka, 1983. 184 pp.

=== Articles and chapters ===
- Копыстянский, Р. С. “Вопросы методики исследования и классификации трещин в нефтяной геологии” [Methodological issues in the study and classification of fractures in petroleum geology]. In: Труды Всесоюзного совещания по трещинным коллекторам нефти и газа [Proceedings of the All-Union Conference on Fractured Oil and Gas Reservoirs]. Leningrad: Gostoptekhizdat, 1961.
- Копыстянский, Р. С. “Проницаемость соленосных пород в связи с нефтегазоносностью” [Permeability of salt-bearing rocks in relation to petroleum potential]. In: Условия образования и особенности нефтегазоносности солянокупольных структур [Formation conditions and petroleum characteristics of salt-dome structures]. Kyiv: Naukova Dumka, 1966, issue 1, pp. 284–291.
- Копыстянский, Р. С. “Изменение трещиноватости горных пород с глубиной и её влияние на коллекторские свойства пород” [Changes in rock fracturing with depth and their influence on reservoir properties]. In: Изучение коллекторов нефти и газа, залегающих на большой глубине [Study of deeply buried oil and gas reservoirs]. Moscow: Nedra, 1977, issues 123–124, pp. 45–47.
- Копыстянский, Р. С. “Влияние геологических факторов на неоднородность пород-коллекторов на больших глубинах” [The influence of geological factors on the heterogeneity of reservoir rocks at great depths]. In: Коллекторские свойства пород на больших глубинах [Reservoir properties of rocks at great depths]. Moscow: Nauka, 1985, pp. 53–59.

== Personal life ==
Kopystianskyi was married to Nonna Khomivna Kopystianska (1924–2013), a literary scholar, Doctor of Philological Sciences and professor at the University of Lviv. Their son, Ihor Kopystianskyi, became a contemporary artist.

== Death and burial ==
Kopystianskyi died in Lviv on 8 September 2013. He was buried in the Mokhnatskyi–Kopystianskyi family tomb in field No. 70 of Lychakiv Cemetery.

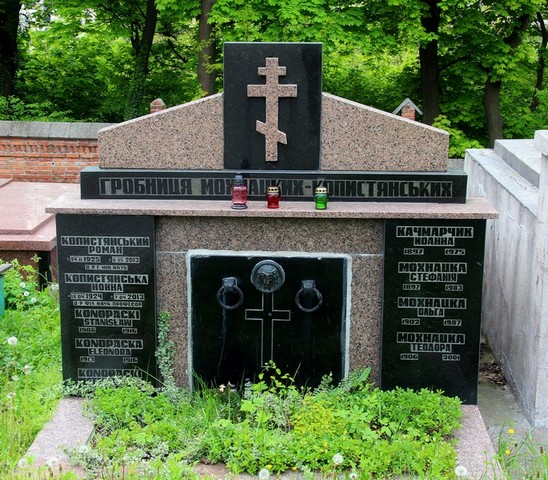
The Mokhnatskyi–Kopystianskyi family tomb at Lychakiv Cemetery
