= Yakovlev Yak-42 =

Soviet mid-range trijet airliner

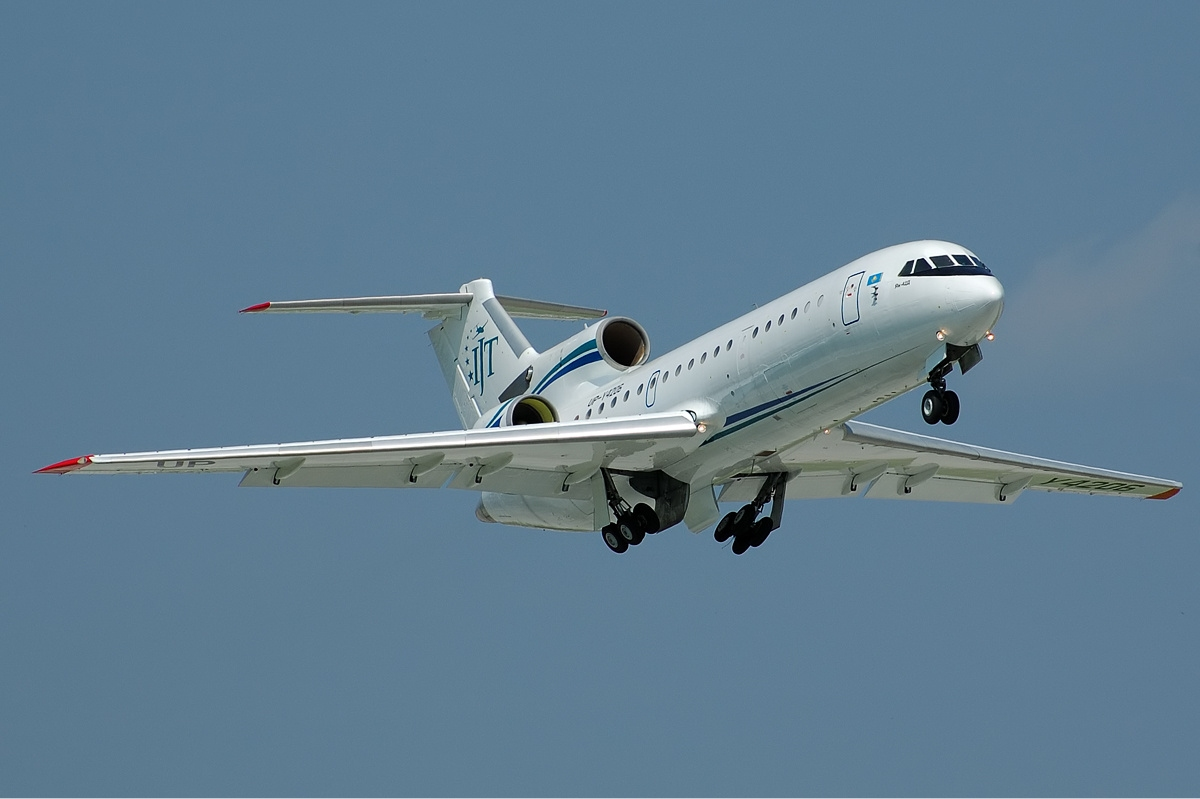
- A Yakovlev Yak-42D of IJT in 2008

General information
- Type: Narrow-body airliner
- Designer: Yakovlev
- Built by: Saratov Aviation Plant
- Status: In limited service
- Primary users: KrasAvia Arctic Airlines; Kosmos Airlines; Aeroflot (historical)
- Number built: 187

History
- Manufactured: 1977–2003
- Introduction date: 22 December 1977
- First flight: 7 March 1975
- Developed from: Yakovlev Yak-40
- Developed into: Yakovlev Yak-46 (planned only)

The Yakovlev Yak-42 (Russian: Яковлев Як-42; NATO reporting name: "Clobber") is a 100–120-seat three-engined mid-range passenger jet developed in the mid-1970s to replace the obsolete Tupolev Tu-134. It was the first airliner produced in the Soviet Union to be powered by modern high-bypass turbofan engines.

== Development ==
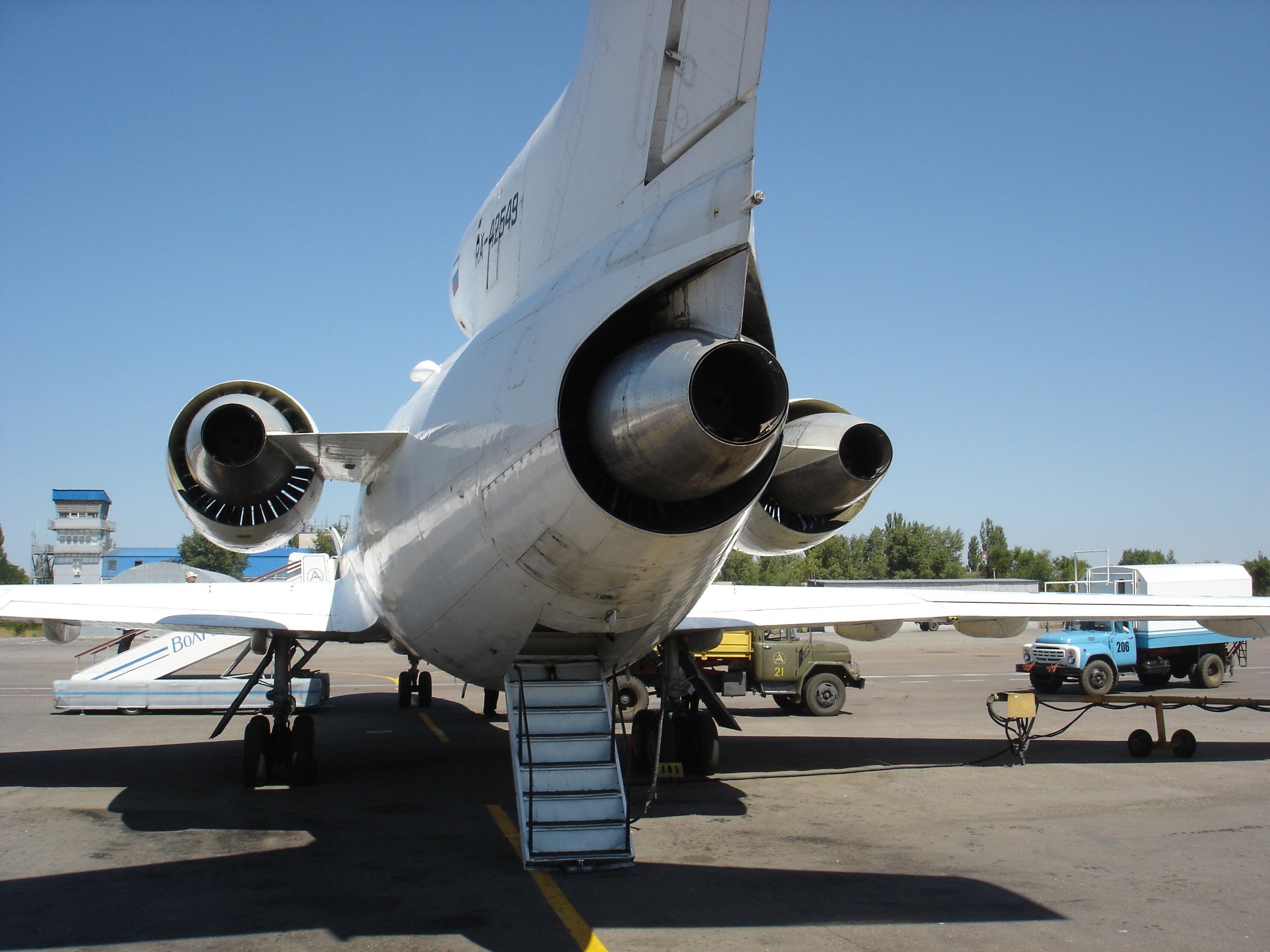
A rear view showing the three turbofan exhausts and the lowered rear airstair.

In 1972, the Yakovlev design bureau started work on a short- to medium-range airliner capable of carrying 100–120 passengers. It was intended to be a replacement for the Tupolev Tu-134 jet as well as the Ilyushin Il-18, Antonov An-24 and An-26 turboprop airliners. While the new airliner was required to operate from relatively small airfields while maintaining good economy, as many Soviet airports had been upgraded to accommodate more advanced aircraft, it did not have to have the same ability to operate from grass strips as Yakovlev's smaller Yak-40. The requirement resulted in the largest, heaviest and most powerful aircraft designed by Yakovlev.

Initial design proposals included a straight-wing airliner powered by two Soloviev D-30 turbofans and resembling an enlarged Yak-40, but this was rejected as it was considered uncompetitive compared to Western airliners powered by high bypass ratio turbofans. Yakovlev settled on a design powered by three of the new Lotarev D-36 three-shaft high-bypass turbofans, which were to provide 63.90 kN (14,330 lbf) of thrust. Unlike the Yak-40, the new airliner would have swept wings.

The first of three prototypes, which was fitted with an 11-degree wing and registered SSSR-1974, made its maiden flight on 7 March 1975. It was followed by the second prototype, (SSSR-1975) with the 23-degree wing and a cabin with 20 rows of windows instead of 17 in the first prototype, and a third prototype (SSSR-1976) fitted with improved de-icing gear.

== Design ==
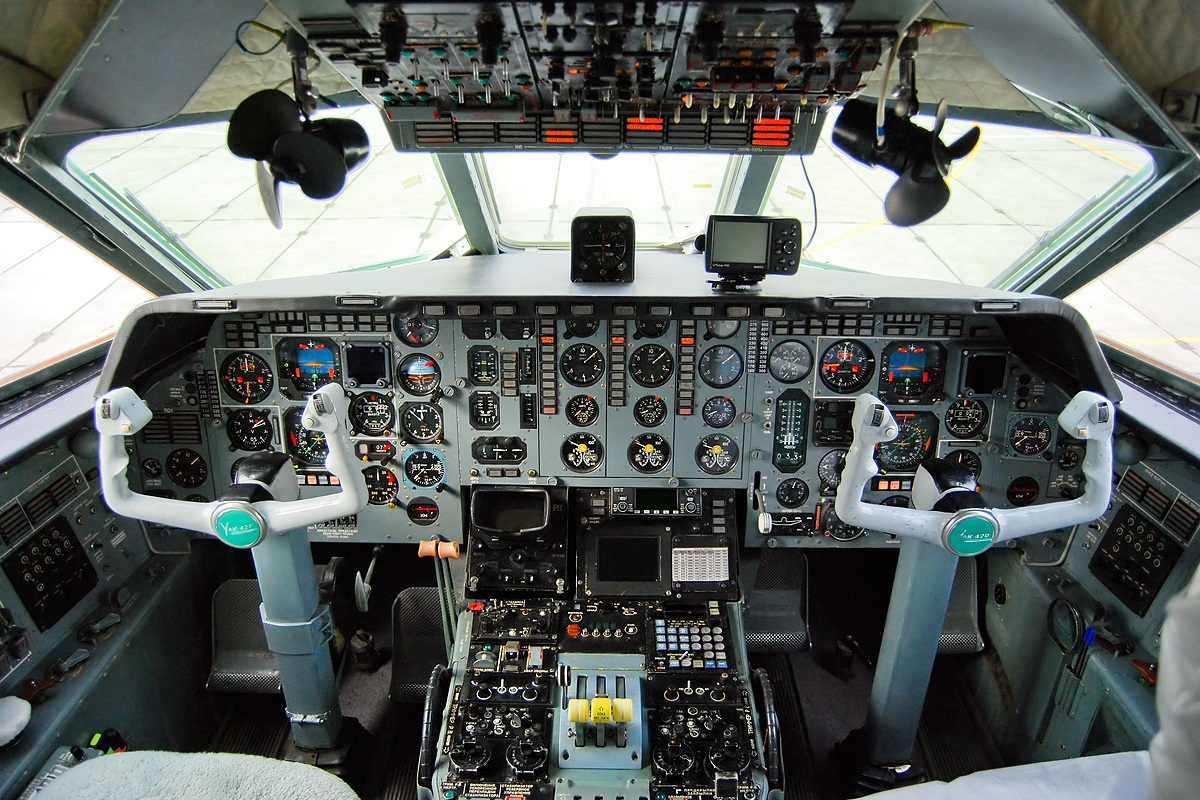
two-crew flight deck

The Yak-42 is a low-winged monoplane of all-metal construction, with a design lifespan of 30,000 one-hour flights. It has a pressurised fuselage of circular section, with the cabin designed to carry 120 passengers in six-abreast layout (or 100 passengers for local services with greater space allocated to carry-on luggage and coat stowage). The aircraft is flown by a flight crew of two pilots. For access to the cabin two airstairs are available, one in the underside of the rear fuselage, like that of the Yak-40, and one forward of the cabin on the port side. Two holds are located under the cabin, carrying baggage, cargo and mail.

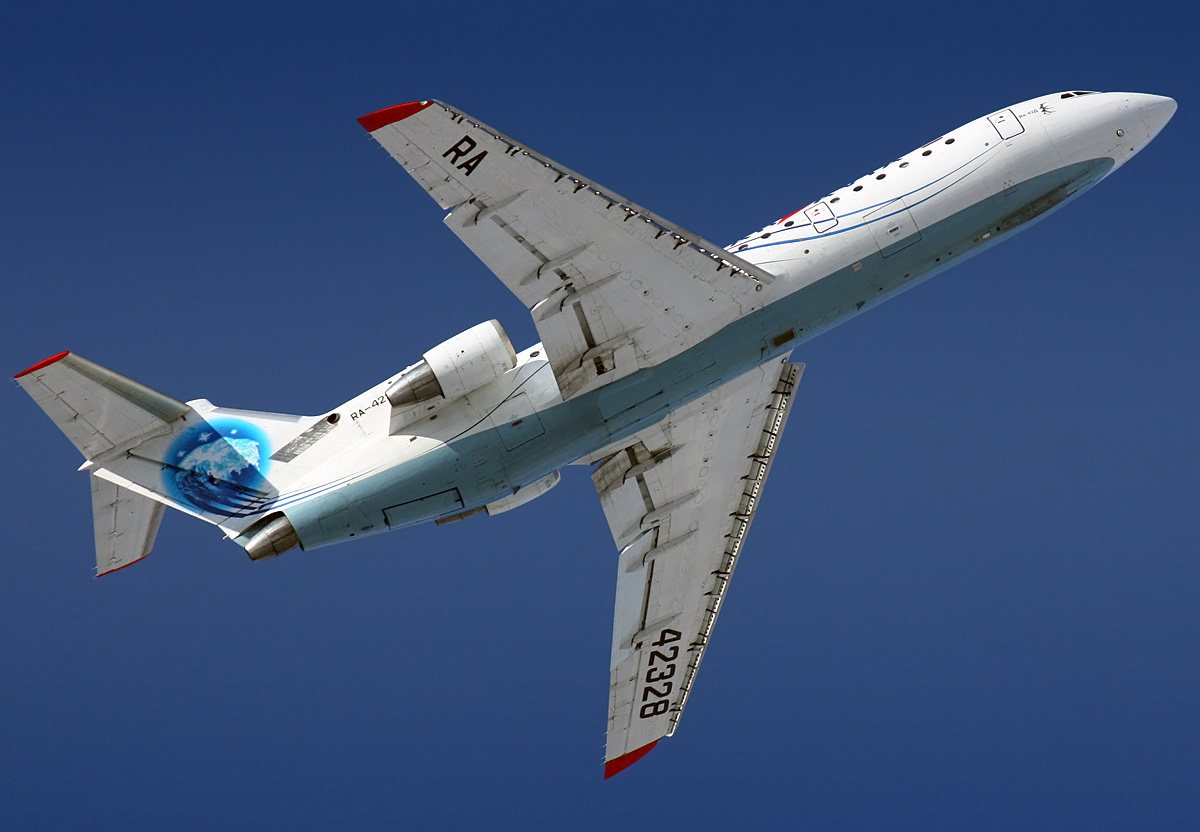
The Yak-42 has a low swept wing

All of the prototypes had main landing gear with two wheels each, with the first serial production aircraft, four main wheels were introduced. The wing layout underwent considerable revision during the design process, with the first prototype being built with a wing sweep of 11 degrees and the second prototype with a sweep of 23 degrees. After evaluation, the greater sweep of the second prototype was chosen for production. Early aircraft had a clean wing leading edge with no control surfaces, and plain trailing edge flaps. This changed in later aircraft, which were fitted with leading edge slats, with the trailing edge flaps slotted.

Two engines were mounted in pods on either side of the rear fuselage, with the third installed in the rear fuselage, fed with air through an "S-duct" inlet. An auxiliary power unit (APU) is also fitted in the rear fuselage. No thrust reversers are fitted. The aircraft has a T-tail, with both the vertical fin and the horizontal surfaces swept.

== Operational history ==
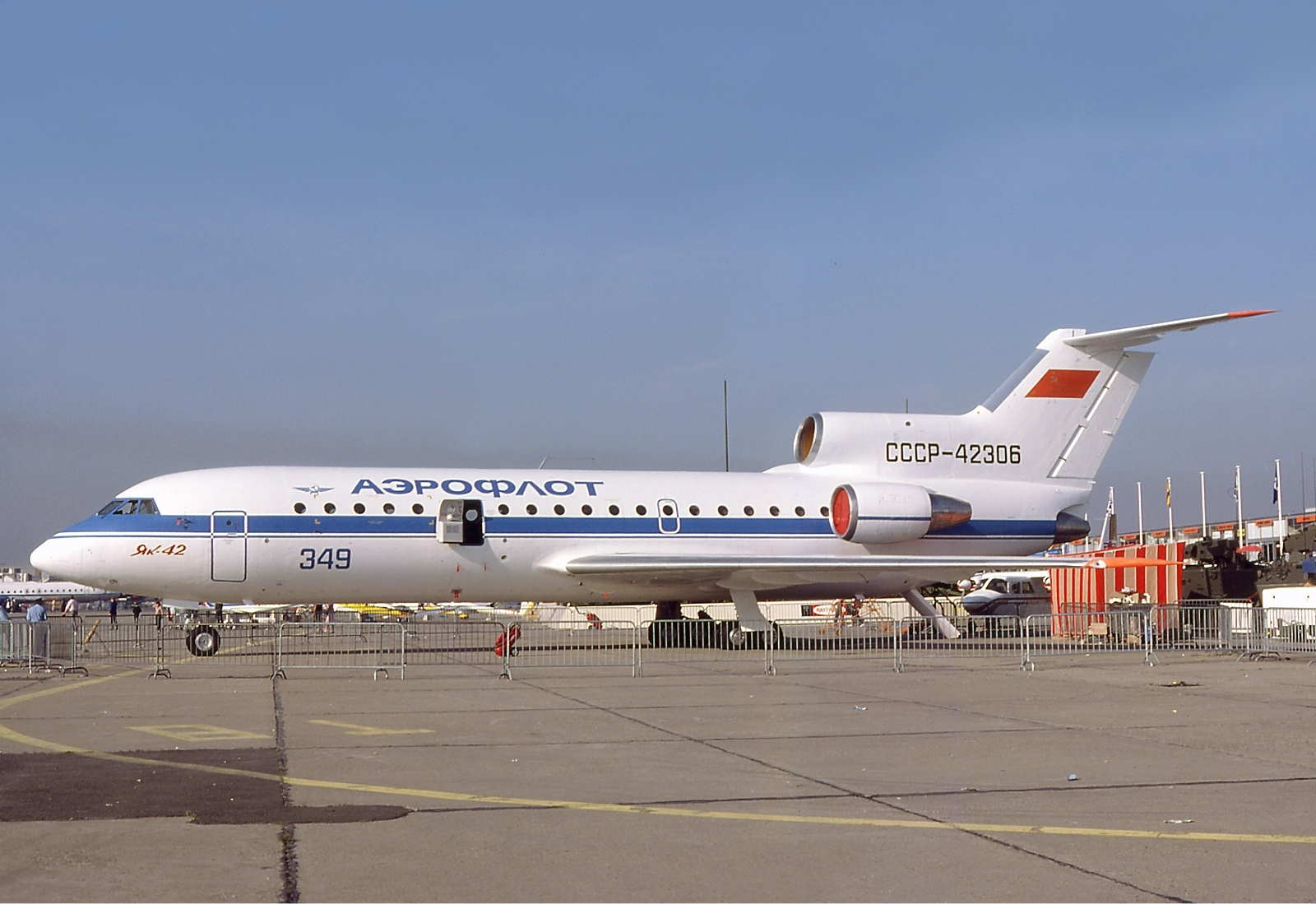
Aeroflot Yak-42 at the 1981 Paris Air Show

The first production aircraft was completed on 28 April 1978, with the first scheduled passenger flight, on the Aeroflot Moscow-Krasnodar route taking place on 22 December 1980. Production was at first slow, with only 10 flown by mid-1981. Initial aircraft were fitted for 120 seats in a three-plus-three arrangement. This was soon changed to a first class section with two-plus-two seating, and a main cabin with 96 seats, giving a total of 104 seats.

In its first year of operation Aeroflot's Yak-42s carried about 200,000 passengers, mainly on routes from Moscow, but also on international services from Leningrad to Helsinki and from Donetsk to Prague, with the type being planned to enter wider service throughout the Aeroflot fleet. On 28 June 1982, however, the tailplane detached from an Aeroflot Yak-42 in flight owing to a failure of the actuator screw jack, causing the aircraft to fatally crash near Mazyr. The type was grounded as a result, not returning to service until October 1984.

An export order for seven aircraft was announced in 1982 by Aviogenex of Yugoslavia, but the contract lapsed. The availability of the longer-range Yak-42D variant from 1991 onwards gave rise to a few more export sales, to Bosnia, China, Cuba, and Iran. As of 1 January 1995 a total of 185 Yak-42 had been produced, including 105 Yak-42Ds.

== Variants ==
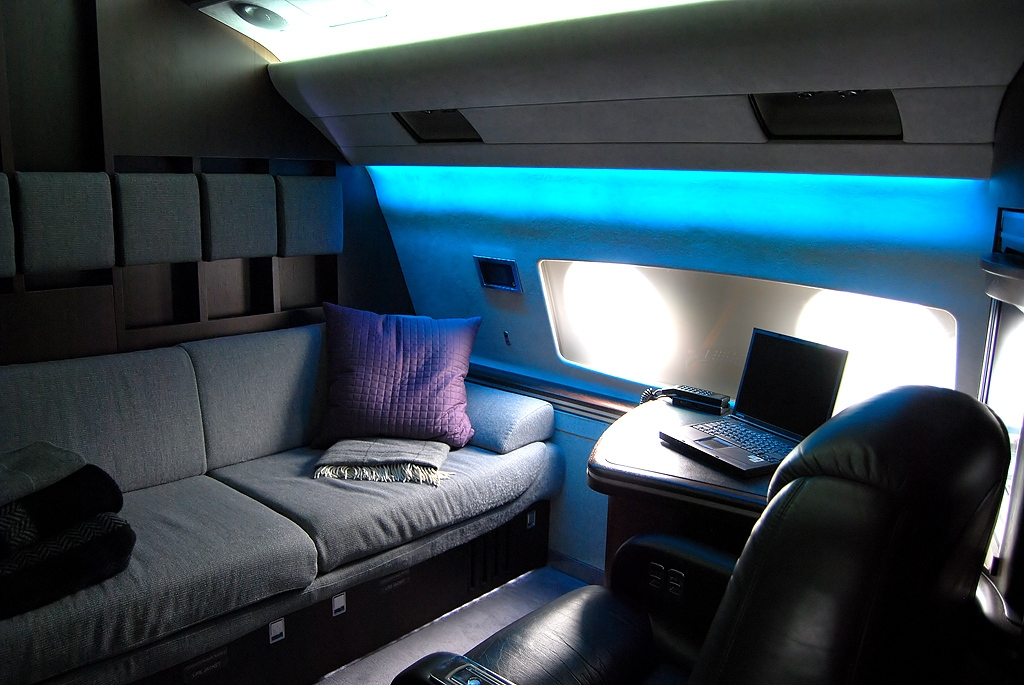
Business aircraft interior

Yak-42

Original production version. Max. takeoff weight 54,000 kg (119,050 lb).

Yak-42ML

Version with modified avionics for use on international use (mezhdunarodnyye linii – international services). Entered service in July 1981 on the Leningrad-Helsinki route.

Yak-42D

Long-range version (Dal'niy – long range) increased fuel. Replaced standard Yak-42 in production.

Yak-142

Derivative of Yak-42D with updated, western AlliedSignal avionics, spoilers to allow faster descent and enlarged cabin door to accommodate jet bridge. Also designated Yak-42A, Yak-42-100 and Yak-42D-100.

Yak-42R

Yak-42 used as testbed for radar for Yakovlev Yak-141 fighter.

Yak-42F

Conversion of a Yak-42 for geophysical survey and environmental monitoring. Fitted with large underwing pods containing electro-optical sensors.

Yak-42LL

Conversion as testbed for Progress D-236 propfan engine. Single D-236 (rated at 8,090 kW [10,850 shp]) mounted in place of starboard engine, on special pylon to give sufficient clearance for 4.2 m (13 ft 9¾ in) propellers. First flew 15 March 1991.

Yak-42M

A projected but unbuilt stretched airliner. Planned to be powered by three Progress D-436 turbofans, a stretched fuselage and new wings. Design developed into Yak-242.

Yak-242

Further developed Yak-42M, with two underwing Aviadvigatel PS-90 turbofans. Design evolved into Irkut MC-21.

== Operators ==
As of July 2019, 22 Yak-42s remained in commercial airline service. Operators are Izhavia (8), KrasAvia (10) and Turukhan Airlines (4).

As of August 2025, Izhavia operates six and KrasAvia operates eight Yak-42. As of July 2019 Turukhan Airlines has thirteen Yak-42.

== Accidents and incidents ==
As of 15 February 2018, eight fatal accidents and one non-fatal incident have occurred on the Yak-42 with a total of 570 casualties.

28 June 1982
Aeroflot Flight 8641, a Yak-42 (CCCP-42529) lost control, entered a dive, broke up in mid-air and crashed near Verbovichi, Naroulia District, Byelorussian Soviet Socialist Republic following a failure of the horizontal stabilizer jackscrew due to fatigue caused by design flaws, killing all 132 on board. All Yak-42s were grounded until the defect was rectified in October 1984. The accident remains the deadliest involving the Yak-42 as well as the deadliest in Belarus to date.

September 1986
An Aeroflot Yak-42 (CCCP-42536) was being used for security forces training when a thunderflash ignited the interior. The aircraft burned out, but there were no casualties.

14 September 1990
Aeroflot Flight 8175, a Yak-42 (CCCP-42351), struck trees and crashed short of the runway at Koltsovo Airport, Sverdlovsk, Russian Soviet Federative Socialist Republic, after the pilot intentionally deviated from the approach pattern, killing four of 129 on board.

31 July 1992
China General Aviation Flight 7552, a Yak-42D (B-2755), overran the runway on takeoff from Nanjing Dajiaochang Airport, China, after failing to lift off, killing 108 of 126 on board. The horizontal stabilizer had been trimmed in the landing position.

20 November 1993
Avioimpex Flight 110, a Yak-42D (RA-42390) leased from Saravia, struck the side of Mount Trojani (near Ohrid, North Macedonia) due to pilot error, killing all 116 on board. Macedonian investigators blamed the accident on an inoperable VOR beacon and pilot error, while Russia claimed a misunderstanding from ATC because the controller spoke Macedonian while the crew used Russian and English in their transmissions. The accident remains the deadliest in North Macedonia.

17 December 1997
Aerosvit Flight 241, a Yak-42 (UR-42334) leased from Lviv Airlines, struck the side of Mount Pente Pigadia in the Pierian Mountains of Greece due to pilot error and confusion in the cockpit, killing all 70 on board.

25 December 1999
Cubana de Aviación Flight 310, a Yak-42D (CU-T1285), struck San Luis hill while on approach to Bejuma, Cuba, after the pilot radioed that he was descending 8,000 ft (2,400 m) to 4,000 ft (1,200 m) as part of the approach following a 40 minute hold, killing all 22 on board.

26 May 2003
UM Airlines Flight 4230, a Yak-42D (UR-42352) struck a mountain near Maçka, Trabzon, Turkey, in poor visibility due to pilot error, killing all 75 on board. The aircraft was flying 62 Spanish soldiers, members of the ISAF mission operating in Afghanistan, back to Spain.

7 September 2011
Lokomotiv Yaroslavl plane crash, a YAK-Service Yak-42D (RA-42434), stalled and crashed shortly after takeoff from Tunoshna Airport, Yaroslavl, Russia, due to pilot error; of the 45 on board, only the mechanic survived; 29 members of the KHL hockey team Lokomotiv Yaroslavl were among the dead.

26 February 2013
While taxiing to its stand, the left wing tip of an Antonov An-124 operated by Volga-Dnepr Airlines struck the top of the fuselage of a parked Yakovlev Yak-42 belonging to Tulpar Air.

== Specifications (Yak-42D) ==
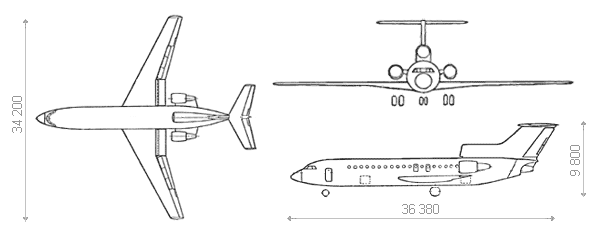
three-view diagram

Data from Brassey's World Aircraft & Systems Directory 1999/2000.

General characteristics

- Crew: 2 pilots plus optional flight engineer
- Capacity: up to 120 passengers (normally eight first class and 96 economy class)
- Length: 36.38 m (119 ft 4 in)
- Wingspan: 34.88 m (114 ft 5 in)
- Height: 9.83 m (32 ft 3 in)
- Wing area: 150 m^{2} (1,600 sq ft)
- Airfoil: root: TsAGI SR-9 (8.5%); tip: TsAGI SR-9 (6.5%)
- Empty weight: 33,000 kg (72,753 lb)
- Max takeoff weight: 57,500 kg (126,766 lb)
- Powerplant: 3 × Lotarev D-36 turbofan engines, 63.75 kN (14,330 lbf) thrust each

Performance

- Maximum speed: 810 km/h (500 mph, 440 kn)
- Cruise speed: 740 km/h (460 mph, 400 kn)
- Range: 4,000 km (2,500 mi, 2,200 nmi)
- Service ceiling: 9,600 m (31,500 ft)

== See also ==
Related development

- Yakovlev Yak-40
- Yakovlev Yak-46

Aircraft of comparable role, configuration, and era

- Boeing 727
- Hawker Siddeley Trident
- Tupolev Tu-154

Related lists

- List of jet airliners
- List of Yakovlev aircraft
