= List of aircraft manufactured by China =

This is a list of aircraft manufactured by the People's Republic of China, including military and civilian fixed-wing, rotary-wing and unmanned aircraft.

== Military aircraft designation system ==
As a convention, the designations of Chinese military aircraft usually start from 5 instead of 1.

Abbreviations	Aircraft Type	Simplified Chinese	Traditional Chinese	Literal translation
H	Bomber	轰炸机	轟炸機	Bomber
J	Fighter aircraft	歼击机	殲擊機	Fighter
JH	Fighter-bomber	歼击轰炸机	殲擊轟炸機	Fighter-bomber
JJ	Operational conversion trainer	歼击教练机	殲擊教練機	Fighter-trainer
JL	Trainer	教练机	教練機	Trainer
JZ	Reconnaissance fighter	歼击侦察机	殲擊偵察機	Fighter reconnaissance aircraft
Q	Ground attack aircraft	强击机	强擊機	Attack plane
KJ	Airborne early warning and control	空中预警机	空中預警機	AWACS
KQ	Anti-submarine and maritime patrol	空中反潜机	空中反潛機	Airborne anti-submarine plane
Y	Transport aircraft	运输机	運輸機	Transport plane
Z	Helicopter	直升机	直升機	Helicopter
WZ	Unmanned surveillance and reconnaissance aerial vehicle	无人侦察机	無人偵察機	Unmanned reconnaissance
GJ	Unmanned combat aerial vehicle	攻击无人机	攻擊無人機	Unmanned attack

== Bombers ==
Designation	Manufacturer	Status	Number built	Remarks	Main variant
H-5	Harbin	Retired in 2011	hundreds	Strategic bomber	H-5 - Standard three-seat tactical bomber H-5A - Nuclear capable variant
SH-5	Harbin	Active	8	Amphibious ASW-bomber	SH-5X - Prototype SH-5 - Maritime patrol SH-B - Firefighter
H-6	Xi'an	Active	241+	Strategic bomber	H-6 – Conventional bomber H-6A – Nuclear capable variant H-6B – Aerial reconnaissance variant H-6C – H-6 with improved counter-measures suite. H-6D – Anti-ship missile carrier introduced in early 1980s H-6E – H-6A with improved counter-measures suite H-6F – Upgraded H-6A and H-6C with modern electronics H-6G – Provides targeting data to ground-launched cruise missiles H-6H – Land-attack cruise missile carrier
H-6(modernized)	Xi'an	Active	241+	Strategic bomber, modernized H-6	H-6K – Modernized H-6 with new engines, larger air intakes, re-designed flight deck and large dielectric nose radome H-6M – Cruise missile carrier, fitted with terrain-following system and four under-wing hardpoints for weapons carriage H-6N – Air-launched ballistic missile carrier capable of launching Dongfeng-21D anti-ship ballistic missile or the CJ-100 supersonic cruise missile
H-8	Xi'an	Cancelled	–	Development of H-6, project cancelled	
H-20	Xi'an	In development	–	Strategic bomber	

== Fighter aircraft ==
Designation	Manufacturer	Status	Number Built	Remarks	Main variant
J-2	Shenyang	Retired in 1986	500+	Air superiority fighter	J-2 – Single seat fighter JJ-2 – Two seat trainer
J-5	Shenyang	Retired in 1992	1820+	Air superiority fighter	J-5 – Single seat fighter JJ-5 – Two seat trainer J-5A – Radar upgraded variant
J-6	Shenyang	Retired in 2010	4500+	Air superiority fighter	J-6A – Single seat fighter J-6B – Upgraded J-6A with two air-to-air missiles and removed the cannon J-6C – Day fighter version with three 30mm cannon, braking parachute and domestic built engine J-6III – Upgraded J-6A with radome on the splitter plate and domestic built radar JJ-6 – Two-seat trainer JZ-6 – Reconnaissance version with fuselage camera pack replacing cannon J-6W – Unmanned variant
J-7	Chengdu	Retired in 2016	1940	Air superiority fighter	J-7 – First domestically built model J-7I – Improved J-7 with an additional gun, variable intake nosecone and modified intake wall J-7B/J-7II – Improved J-7I with larger fuel tank, upgraded WP-7II engine J-7IIA – Upgraded J-7II with western avionics J-7C/J-7III – All-weather fighter models equipped with fire control radar, powered by WP-13F and Type 481 data link J-7D/J-7IIIA – Upgraded J-7III with newer avionics and WP-13FI engine J-7E/J-7IV– modernized J-7 with newly designed double delta wing and upgraded avionics J-7FS – utilizes WP-13IIS engine and a redesigned under-chin inlet with a divider inside the intake J-7G – further development of J-7E with newer radar JJ-7- Two-seat trainer
J-8	Shenyang	Retired in 2011	408	Interceptor	J-8 - Initial day fighter variant J-8I – Improved all-weather variant J-8E – Upgraded J-8I with mono-pulse fire-control radar and improved ECM suite JZ-8 – Reconnaissance variant J-8ACT – Fly-by-wire test-bed aircraft
J-8II	Shenyang	Active	408	Interceptor Developed from J-8	J-8II – Re-engineered from J-8I with redesigned nose/front section and fuselage. Replaced the nose air inlet with a solid nose and lateral air intakes, and upgraded with new WP-13 engine and type 208 radar J-8D – Modified J-8B with fixed refuelling probe and updated avionics J-8F – Upgraded J-8D with WP-13BII engine, JL-10 radar and glass cockpit J-8H – Fighter-bomber variant, upgraded with KLJ-1 radar and FK-2 datalink, can carry guided bomb and anti-ship missile JZ-8 – Reconnaissance variant J-8IIACT – Fly-by-wire test-bed aircraft
J-9	Chengdu	Cancelled	–	Air superiority fighter, cancelled single-engine fighter project during 1980s	
FC-1 (JF-17)	Chengdu&PAC	Active	200+	Multi-role fighter, jointly developed by Chengdu and PAC, Pakistan	JF-17A - Single-seat fighter JF-17B - Twin-seat variant JF-17 Block2 – Upgraded with composites in the airframe for reduced weight and air-to-air refuelling capability JF-17 Block3 - Upgraded with AESA radar, fly-by-wire flight control system, IRST. Replace the RD-93MA engine with Guizhou WS-13 engine
J-10	Chengdu	Active	602+	Multi-role fighter	J-10A - Single seat fighter J-10S - Twin-seated trainer variant of J-10A J-10B - An upgraded J-10 with DSI intake and PESA radar IRST, powered by the AL-31FN M1 J-10B TVC Demonstrator - A prototype fighter based on J-10B that is equipped with WS-10B thrust-vectoring control engine J-10C - Upgraded J-10B equipped with AESA radar and imaging infrared seeker (IIR) J-10D - Electronic warfare variant with straight, protruding spine in the central airframe, containing electronic countermeasure and warfare systems
J-11	Shenyang	Active	442+	Air superiority fighter	J-11A (or J-11) - Chinese/Russian assembled Su-27SK from Russian-made kits J-11B - Chinese-developed variant with domestic subsystems. Block 02 powered by Shenyang WS-10 turbofan J-11BS - Twin-seat version J-11B(AESA) - Variant with light-grey radome; speculated to be equipped with AESA radar.
J-12	Nanchang	Cancelled	5–8	Air superiority fighter, cancelled light-weight single-engine fighter project during 1970s	J-12 - Initial version of the light fighter with pitot bi-furcated air intake and non-afterburning engine J-12I - (aka J-12A) Improved J-12 powered by a 8,929 lbf (39.72 kN) Wopen WP-6Z afterburning turbojet
J-13	Shenyang	Cancelled	–	Air superiority fighter, cancelled light-weight single-engine fighter project	
J-15	Shenyang	Active	116+	Aircraft carrier based multi-role fighter	J-15 - Single-seat variant J-15S - Two-seat variant J-15D - Two-seat Electronic warfare (EW) variant, with EW pods and other electronic equipment installed and IRST sensor removed. J-15T - Improved variant of J-15 incorporating CATOBAR launch capability, modern fifth-generation avionics, AESA radar, new airframes, stealth coatings, and compatibility to launch PL-10 and PL-15 missiles.
J-16	Shenyang	Active	500+	Strike fighter	J-16 - Initial version strike variant derived from J-11BS J-16D - Electronic warfare (EW) variant. Equipped with wingtip EW pods; internal EW system replaces IRST and 30 mm cannon
J-20	Chengdu	Active	500+	Stealth air superiority fighter	J-20A - First production variant of the J-20 J-20B - Improved J-20 variant with thrust-vectoring control (TVC) engines. J-20S - The twin-seat variant of J-20, the co-pilot is presumed to coordinate attacks and reconnaissance missions with UCAVs.
J-35	Shenyang	Active	57+	Stealth multirole fighter	FC-31 - Prototype J-31B - Larger variant based on FC-31 J-35 - Naval variant J-35A - Land based variant
J-36	Chengdu	In development		Stealth multirole fighter	
J-50	Shenyang	In development		Stealth multirole fighter	

== Attacker/ Fighter-bomber ==
Designation	Manufacturer	Status	Number	Remarks	Main Variant
Q-5	Nanchang	Retired in 2010s	1300+	Attack aircraft based on the Shenyang J-6	Q-5 - Original production version with a total of 6 pylons Q-5Jia - Q-5 modified to carry nuclear bombs Q-5Yi - Torpedo attacker Q-5I(Q-5A) - Q-5 with the internal weapon bay replaced by internal fuel tank, increasing fuel capacity over 70% Q-5IA(Q-5B) - Improved Q-5I, radar warning receiver and flare dispensers added Q-5II(Q-5C) - Q-5I with omnidirectional radar warning receivers Q-5E - Pylon with ability to mount laser-guided bombs, improved fire control system JQ-5J - Tandem two seater of Q-5 Q-5L - Upgraded Q-5C, with LLLTV/FLIR vision systems for a day/night capability
Q-6	Nanchang	Cancelled	–	Attack aircraft Project cancelled	
JH-7	Xi'an	Active	270+	Fighter-bomber	JH-7 – Initial production version JH-7A – Upgrade variant with new structure and improved avionics JH-7A2 – Improved variant with new radar and enhanced air-to-surface missile carrying capabilities.
JH-XX		In development		Stealth fighter bomber	

== Airborne early warning and control (AEW&C) ==
Designation	Manufacturer	Status	Number	Remarks
KJ-1	Xi'an	Cancelled	1	Large AEW&C based on Tupolev Tu-4
KJ-2000	Xi'an	Active	5	Large AEW&C based on Ilyushin Il-76
KJ-3000	Xi'an	In development		Large AEW&C based on Y-20B
KJ-200	Shaanxi	Active	11	Medium AEW&C based on Y-8
KJ-500	Shaanxi	Active	60+	Medium AEW&C based on Y-9
KJ-600	Xi'an	Active	6+	Medium carrier-based AEW&C based on Y-7

== Maritime patrol/anti-submarine aircraft ==
Designation	Manufacturer	Status	Number	Remarks
KQ-200	Shaanxi	Active	20+	Based on Y-9, previously known as GX-6

== Trainers ==
Designation	Manufacturer	Status	Number	Remarks
CJ-5	Nanchang	Retired	379	Copy of Yakovlev Yak-18,
CJ-6	Nanchang	Active	2000+	Basic propeller trainer
CJ-7	Hongdu/Yakolev	Cancelled	–	Jointly developed by China and Russia
JJ-1	Shenyang	Cancelled	3	Basic jet trainer, cancelled (a.k.a. 红专-503, Hong Zhuan-503, "Red Special")
JJ-2	Shenyang	Retired		Trainer version of J-2
JJ-5	Shenyang	Retired in 1990	974	Trainer version of J-5
JJ-6	Shenyang	Retired in 2010	624	Trainer version of J-6
JJ-7	Guizhou	Retired in 2023		Trainer version of J-7
JL-8	Hongdu&PAC	Active	783	Basic jet trainer/attacker jointly developed with Pakistan
JL-9	Guizhou	Active	80+	Developed from JJ-7
JL-10	Hongdu	Active	70+	Advanced jet trainer/attacker

== Military utility aircraft (transport/tanker/passenger) ==
Designation	Manufacturer	Number	Remarks	Main Variant
Y-5	Shijiazhuang	948	Copy of An-2	Y-5A – First mass-produced, version, light passenger transport, equivalent to the An-2T. Y-5B – agricultural aircraft, equivalent to the An-2 SKh. Y-5B-100 – Y-5B aircraft fitted with triple tipsails on the upper wing tips, which reputedly gave 20% higher climb rate and improved L/D ratio by 15%. Y-5B(T) – A para-dropping version developed for the PLAAF, with up-dated avionics including a GPS. Y-5B(K) – Variously reported as a tourist variant or Agricultural variant. Y-5B(D) – Variously reported as an Agricultural variant or Tourist variant. Y-5C – Amphibian version of Y-5A fitted with two floats. Y-5D – Bomber crew trainer. Y-5K – A VIP passenger variant with five seats.
Y-6	–	–	License-built Il-14, project cancelled	
Y-7	Xi'an	103	Based on An-24	Y-7E - Speculative designation for a 'Hot and High" version with more powerful engines. Y-7G - A military variant of the MA60 produced for the PLAAF. Y-7H - A reverse-engineered An-26 with rear loading ramp for the PLAAF, entering production in 1992. Y7H-500 - Civil variant of the Y-7H certified in 1994. Y-7-100 - Improved version, developed in co-operation with HAECO (Hong Kong Aircraft Engineering Company), with redesigned cockpit and cabin, as well as winglets, capable of carrying 52 passengers. Y-7-100C1/C2/C3 - Five-crew variant with equipment changes. Y-7-200 - Fitted with new avionics; without winglets. Y-7-200A - Powered by two Pratt & Whitney PW127C turboprop engines. Y-7-200B - Stretched version (74 cm (29 in)) with WJ5A-1G engines, built for the Chinese domestic market. HYJ-7A - pilot and crew trainer for H-6 heavy bombers fitted with a stabilised HM-1A bombsight, bomb-aiming radar and a TNL-7880 combined navigation system. Xian MA60(Y-7-MA60) - 60 seats turboprop-powered airliner, Xian JZY-01 / Y-7 AWACS – Carrier-based airborne early warning and control (AEW&C) variant, used as a testbed for Xian KJ-600.
Y-8	Shaanxi	169	Based on An-12	
Y-9	Shaanxi	30+	Multi-purpose transport, variant of the Y-8 (as Y-8X)	
Y-10	Shanghai	3	Boeing 707 class airliner, project cancelled	
Y-11	Harbin	50	7 seats utility aircraft	
Y-12	Harbin	102+	17 seats utility aircraft	
Y-20	Xi'an	100+	Large multi-purpose transport	
Y-30	Shenyang		Medium multi-purpose transport in development	
AG600	CAIGA	2+	Large multi-purpose amphibious aircraft	

== Military UAV ==
For the reason that Chinese UAV developers/manufacturers have officially released a considerable number of military UAVs, and also due to Chinese government's transparency policy for military UAV, this sub-list will only focus on models that are already identified and introduced into the PLA.

Presumably, the military designation with WZ and GJ are designations for Chinese air force, the BZK, DCK, KVD, JWP are for the Ground force and Navy.

Designation	Manufacturer	Remarks	Main Variant
BZK-005	Harbin	MALE UCAV	BZK-005: Unarmed reconnaissance version. BZK-005C: Developed from original BZK-005 and optimized aerodynamic structure and electronic system with attack and reconnaissance capability. It can equipped with booms or missiles with more than 300 kg payload.
BZK-007	Guizhou&BUAA	MALE UAV	
BZK-008	CASC	Artillery directing UAV	BZK-008: small artillery directing UAV carries a retractable electro-optical/infrared turret containing FLIR and CCD camera for both day and night missions. CH-91: variant for export features redesigned winglets
WZ-5	BUAA	Target/reconnaissance UAV	
WZ-6(PLAAF) BZK-006 (PLAN) KVD001 (PLAGF)	NWPU	Tactical reconnaissance /combat UAV	WZ-6: PLAAF variant, featured with mushroom shaped communication antenna radome. BZK-006: PLAN variant, combat capable, developed from WZ-6 with enlarge the airframe and four underwing hardpoints added BZK-006A: Upgrade version of BZK-006 DCK-006: PLAN variant, unarmed reconnaissance version of BZK-006 KVD001: PLAGF variant, tactical reconnaissance JWP01: PLAGF variant, tactical reconnaissance for artillery observation JWP02: PLAGF variant, developed from WZ-6 with electro-optical turret mounted below the fuselage removed
WZ-7	Guizhou	HALE reconnaissance UAV	
WZ-8	Chengdu	Hypersonic high-altitude reconnaissance UAV	
WZ-9	Shenyang	HALE AEW&C UAV	
WZ-10	Chengdu	HALE reconnaissance UAV/UCAV	WZ-10: Reconnaissance UAV variant with Chinese military designation. Wing Loong-10: Mass-produced version for export. Wind Shadow: UCAV prototype for Chinese domestic version. Featured stealth design, twin-engine, turbofan powered. Cloud Shadow: An export version prototype. Stealth featured, single-engine (optional twin-engine), turbojet powered.
KVD002	CASC&CAAA	MALE UCAV	KDV002: Upgrade version of CASC CH-4. Equipped with diesel piston engine compared with CH-4's petrol piston engine. First MALE UCAV of PLA Army. CH-4: base variant for export.
GJ-1	Chengdu	MALE UCAV	GJ-1: Chinese domestic military version. Wing Loong 1: Basic variant for export. Wing Loong 1E: Upgrade version with composite materials and newer electronics.
GJ-2	Chengdu	MALE UCAV	GJ-2: Chinese domestic military designation. Wing Loong 2: Developed from Wing Loong-1, with provisions for up to twelve air-to-surface missiles Wing Loong 2H: Civilian, communication, emergency response variant, equipped with synthetic aperture radar and optoelectronic pod which is able to relay and amplify telecommunication signals.
Wing Loong 3	Chengdu	MALE UCAV Military designation is unknown	
GJ-11	Hongdu	Stealth UCAV	GJ-21/GJ-11J: Naval carrier-based variant
TB-001	Tengden	MALE UCAV Military designation is unknown	TB-001: 2-engine original model TB-001A: 3-engine variant with payload increased to 1500 kg and max flight ceiling increase to 9500 meters.

== Helicopters ==
Designation	Manufacturer	Remarks
Z-5	Harbin	Copy of Mi-4, retired
Z-6	Harbin	Turboshaft version of the Z-5, fitted with a Dongan WZ-5 turboshaft engine
Z-7	Changhe	Cancelled
Z-8	Changhe	License-built SA321Ja Super Frelon
Z-9	Harbin	License-built Eurocopter Dauphin
Z-10	Changhe	Attack helicopter
Z-11	Changhe	License-built Eurocopter AS350
Z-15	Harbin	6,000 kg-class medium military transport helicopter, military variant of Avicopter AC352
Z-18	Changhe	Medium transport/utility helicopter
Z-19	Harbin	5,000 to 5,500 kg twin-engined light helicopter development, derived from Z-9
Z-20	Harbin	Medium transport/utility helicopter in development
Z-21	Harbin	Heavy attack helicopters based on the Harbin Z-20

== Civilian transport and passenger aircraft ==
Designation	Manufacturer	Status	Remarks
Beijing 1	Beijing	Cancelled	Twin-engined light airliner, cancelled
MA-60	Xi'an	Active	60 seats turboprop-powered airliner, upgrade version of Y-7
MA-600	Xi'an	Active	60 seats turboprop-powered airliner, upgrade version of MA-60
MA700	Xi'an	In development	70-to-80 seats turboprop-powered airliner, to be introduced in 2009
C909	COMAC	Active	70–90 seats advanced regional jet airliner, previously named as ARJ21
C919	COMAC	Active	168–190 seat twin-jet airliner
C929	COMAC	In development	300 seat airliner, in development
C939	COMAC	In development	400 seat airliner, in development
C949	Comac	In development	48 seat supersonic airliner, in development
LE500	CATIC		Aircraft
HO300	SAMC		Amphibious
D-600	China Aero-Vehicle Research Institute		Waterbomber
Primus 100	CAIGA		Business plane
Leadair AG300	CAIGA	In development	Business plane
Starlight 100	CAIGA		Business plane
Starlight 200	CAIGA		Business plane
A2C	China Special Aero-Vehicle Research Institute		Multipurpose
Y15-2000	SAMC		Multipurpose

== Civilian helicopters ==
Designation	Manufacturer	Remarks
HC120	Harbin&Airbus	Civilian light utility helicopter
AC310	Avicopter	Civilian light utility helicopter
AC311	Avicopter	Civilian light utility helicopter
AC313	Avicopter&Changhe	Civilian heavy utility helicopter, civilian variant of Changhe Z-8
AC332	Avicopter&Airbus Helicopters	Civilian medium utility helicopter
AC352	Avicopter&Airbus Helicopters	Civilian medium utility helicopter, military designation Z-15

== Agricultural aircraft ==
Designation	Manufacturer	Remarks
Hongdu N-5	Hongdu	Agricultural aircraft.

== Airships ==
Designation	Manufacturer	Remarks
Mifeng-6	BUAA	Hot air airship
CA-80	Shanghai Vinage Airship Manufacture Co., Ltd.	Non-rigid Airship

== Electric aircraft ==
Designation	Manufacturer	Remarks
E430	Yuneec International	Two-seat electric light sports aircraft.
EViva	Yuneec International	Electric motor-glider.
ESpyder	Yuneec International	Electric aircraft
EPac	Yuneec International	Electric aircraft
CE-25A	Comac	Electric aircraft

== See also ==
- Aviation Industry Corporation of China
- China Aviation Industry Corporation I
- China Aviation Industry Corporation II
- List of Chinese aircraft engines
- List of unmanned aerial vehicles of China
- People's Liberation Army Air Force
- List of Chinese gliders
