= CASIC WJ =

Series of Chinese unmanned aerial vehicles

General information
- Type: Unmanned aerial vehicle
- National origin: China
- Manufacturer: China Aerospace Science and Industry Corporation
- Status: In service
- Primary user: People's Liberation Army Air Force

History
- Introduction date: Early 2010s

CASIC WJ is a series of unmanned aerial vehicles (UAVs) developed by the 3rd Academy Hiwing (HW for short, Chinese: 海鹰) of the China Aerospace Science and Industry Corporation (CASIC), and the academy is also more commonly known as HiWING Mechanical and Electrical Technology Corp., (Chinese: 海鹰机电技术研究院; lit. 'Sea Eagle Mechanical and Electrical Technology Research Academy') or HiWING for short.

== WJ-010 ==
WJ-010 UAV is a development of the unarmed CASIC HW-100 Sparrowhawk, and the two UAVs share the identical layout. As an armed version, WJ-010 utilizes modular design concept to enable the rapid replacement two different kinds of payload: the first payload is the optical payload for reconnaissance, and with this payload, WJ-010 functions as an ordinary scout UAV. The second payload is a warhead, and when armed with this payload, WJ-010 functions as a suicide attack UAV.

== WJ-100 Blade ==
WJ-100 Blade (Dao-Feng or Daofeng, 刀锋) is the latest model (as of early of 2015) of Blade series UAV developed by CASIC, which includes several other models such as CASIC HW-300 and CASIC SF-460. As with other member of Blade series UAV, WJ-100 is also in twin boom layout with high wing configuration and tricycle landing gear. The winglets of WJ-100 is larger in comparison to some earlier model of Blade series. Propulsion is provided by a two-blade propeller driven pusher engine mounted at the rear end of the fuselage.

== WJ-500 ==
WJ-500 is a jet powered UAV developed by CASIC intended for various missions, such as targeting, reconnaissance, target damage assessment, and simulation of cruise missiles and aircraft. WJ-500 has a cylindrical fuselage with inlet atop the empennage. Wing tip tank can be installed on the main wing. WJ-500 made its public debut in November 2014 at the 10th Zhuhai Airshow.

== WJ-600 A/D ==
WJ-600 A/D is a development of CASIC HW-610 and CASIC HW-600 Sky Hawk (WJ-600), and in comparison to its predecessors that is either a reconnaissance only version or a ground attack only version, WJ-600 A/D incorporates both the reconnaissance and ground attack capability so that it can perform both missions, and hence A/D in its name stands for attack drone. WJ-600 A/D is designed to carry out both the reconnaissance mission of WJ-600 and the ground attack mission of HW-610 in a single platform. Specification:

- Endurance (hr): 5
- Speed (km/h): 850
- Propulsion: turbofan

On 27 October 2016, two WJ-600A/Ds were spotted in a military parade in Turkmenistan, the first confirmed export.

== WJ-700 ==
At the 2018 Zhuhai Airshow, CASIC unveiled a medium-/high-altitude long-endurance (MALE/HALE) armed reconnaissance unmanned aerial vehicle named WJ-700 with a maximum takeoff weight (MTOW) of 3,500 kg and an endurance of up to 20 hours. It has four underwing hardpoints and can carry CM-102 anti-radiation missile, C-701, and C-705KD anti-ship missiles, but also land attack munition.

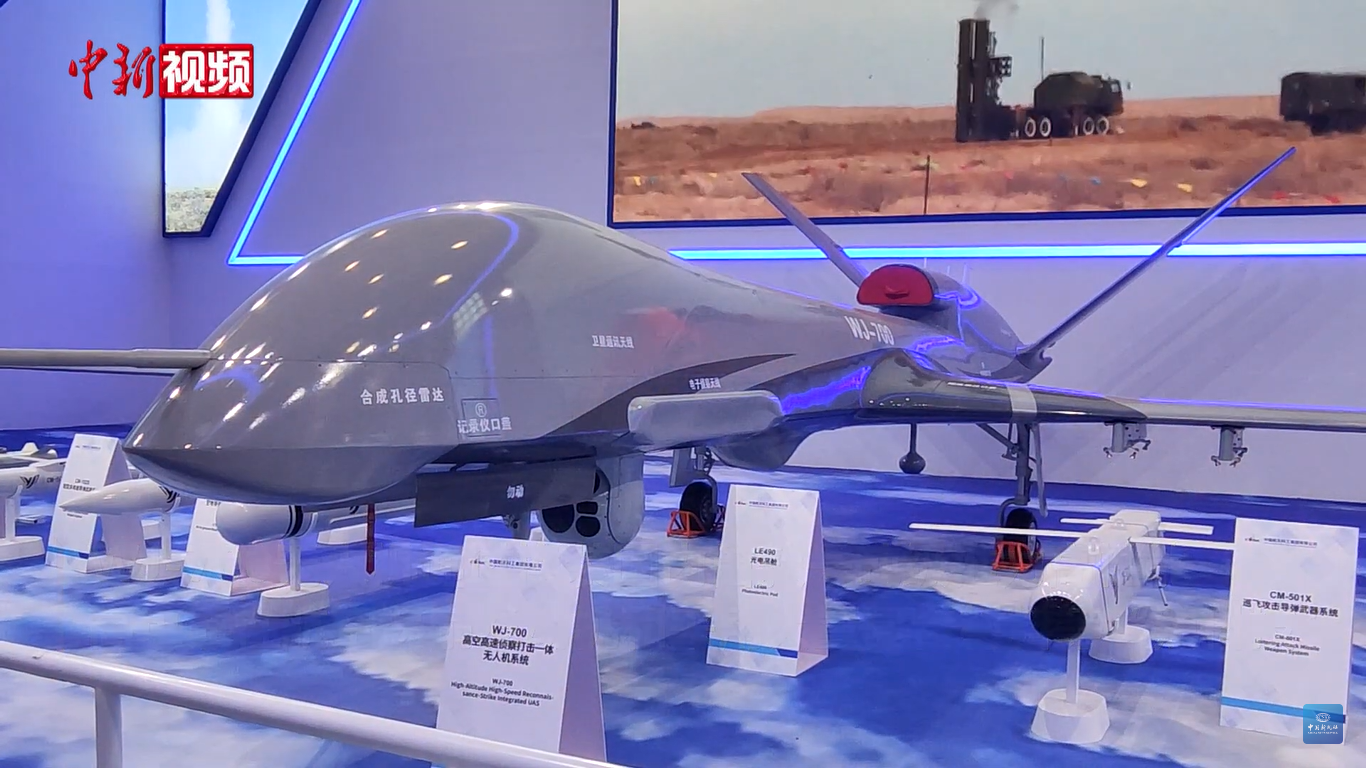
WJ-700

== See also ==
- CAIG Wing Loong
- CAIG Wing Loong II
- CAIG Wing Loong-10
- CASC Rainbow
- Harbin BZK-005
- Tengden TB-001

Related lists

- List of aircraft produced by China
- List of unmanned aerial vehicles of China
