= Divine Eagle =

Divine Eagle may refer to:

- Shenyang WZ-9 Divine Eagle, Chinese military aircraft
- Harbin Z-20/Shendiao-20, Chinese military aircraft
- a fictional condor featured in Jin Yong's wuxia novels
