= People's Liberation Army Ground Force Aviation =

Aerial warfare branch of China's Ground Force

- 中国人民解放军陆军军航空兵
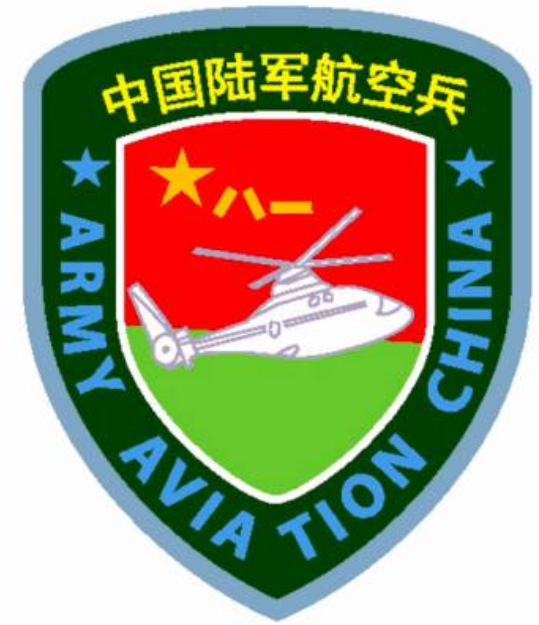
- Badge of the PLAGF Aviation
- Active: 1987–present
- Country: China
- Branch: People's Liberation Army Ground Force
- Type: Army aviation
- Size: ? personnel 1040+ aircraft
- Part of: People's Liberation Army

Aircraft flown
- Attack helicopter: Harbin Z-19, Changhe Z-10
- Cargo helicopter: Mil Mi-17
- Multirole helicopter: Harbin Z-9, Harbin Z-20
- Utility helicopter: Changhe Z-8, Changhe Z-18, Mil Mi-17
- Reconnaissance: BZK-005, BZK-007, WZ-7 Soaring Dragon
- Transport: Y-7, Y-8, Y-9

The People's Liberation Army Ground Force Aviation is the air arm of the Chinese People's Liberation Army Ground Force. Its principal mission is to provide close air support, air assault, transportation, and overall air assistance to the Ground Force. It primarily deploys rotary wing aircraft.

== History ==
The PLA Army Aviation Corps was established on October 3, 1986, by decision of the Central Military Commission, at the time under the leadership of its chairman Deng Xiaoping, as part of an effort to modernize the organization of the PLA. The Corps started operating in 1987. On January 8, 1988, the first army aviation unit was established in the Beijing Military Region.

The initial units of the army aviation corps used equipment transferred from the PLAAF, including mostly the first Chinese-made helicopter, the Harbin Z-5 (a version of the Mil Mi-4), the licensed-made Z-8 (a version of the French Aérospatiale SA 321 Super Frelon) and the American-made S-70C "Black Hawk" purchased during the Sino-American thaw of the 1980s. The success of the American attack helicopters during the Gulf War impressed the Chinese military command, which put more emphasis on the development of indigenous helicopters. This accelerated program would lead to the introduction in 1994 of the Harbin Z-9 (developed from the French Eurocopter AS365 Dauphin), the Harbin Z-19 (an armed variant of the Z-9, introduced in 2012), the medium attack Changhe Z-10 (introduced in 2012), and the medium utility helicopter Harbin Z-20 (generally based on the Black Hawk in configuration, introduced in 2019).

The progress of the local helicopter industry, however, was slow. The difficulty providing relief after the Wenchuan Earthquake of 2008 brought into clear relief the shortage of helicopters in China, both civilian and military, in particular helicopters capable of operating at high altitudes. The need for more helicopters became apparent and the procurement of military rotary wing aircraft accelerated. While the native Z-19 and Z-10 were already available, the Chinese government tried to accelerate the equipment of full brigades by purchasing a large number of Mil Mi-17 helicopters in 2019, a sign of its desire to accelerate the development of army aviation.

== Organization ==
By 2013, the army aviation regiments in six military regions were ungraded to brigades. After the 2015 military reforms, the military regions were merged into theaters and each group army within each theater was intended to have an independent Army Aviation brigade.

As of 2023, each of the 13 PLAGF group armies, plus the Tibet and Xinjiang special military regions, had an aviation brigade, for a total of 13 army aviation brigades and 2 air assault brigades. Each army aviation brigade is composed of 2–3 attack helicopter battalions, and 3–4 transport and assault helicopter battalions, for a total of 32 to 48 attack helicopters and 48 to 64 transport helicopters. The estimated current number of available aircraft runs between 1,000 and 1,500, depending on the source.

The current army aviation units are as follows, the brigade number being usually the same as the group army's number.

- Eastern Theater Command
  - 71st Army Aviation Brigade (attached to the 71st Group Army)
  - 72nd Army Aviation Brigade (attached to the 72nd Group Army)
  - 73rd Army Aviation Brigade (attached to the 73rd Group Army)
- Southern Theater Command
  - 74th Army Aviation Brigade (attached to the 74th Group Army)
  - 121st Air Assault Brigade (attached to the 75th Group Army)
- Northern Theater Command
  - 78th Army Aviation Brigade (attached to the 78th Group Army)
  - 79th Army Aviation Brigade (attached to the 79th Group Army)
  - 80th Army Aviation Brigade (attached to the 80th Group Army)
- Central Theater Command
  - 81st Army Aviation Brigade (attached to the 81st Group Army
  - 82nd Army Aviation Brigade (attached to the 82nd Group Army)
  - 161st Air Assault Brigade (attached to the 83rd Group Army)
- Western Theater Command
  - 76th Army Aviation Brigade (attached to the 76th Group Army
  - 77th Army Aviation Brigade (attached to the 77th Group Army
- The 84th Army Aviation Brigade in the Xinjiang Military Region.
- The 85th Army Aviation Brigade in the Tibet Military Region.

The Beijing Garrison, plus the Macao and Hong Kong Garrisons, are the only major regional subdivisions of the PLA without an attached army aviation brigade (although smaller helicopter units are available).

== Equipment ==
Aircraft	Origin	Type	Variant	In service	Notes
Attack helicopters
Harbin Z-19	China	Attack / Reconnaissance		200+	
Changhe Z-10	China	Attack / Multirole		300+	
Utility helicopters
Harbin Z-9	China	Utility	Z-9WZ	120+	
Mil Mi-17	Russia	Utility	Mi-17/Mi-17-1V/Mi-17-V-5/Mi-17-V-7	88	
Harbin Z-20	China	Utility	Z-20T	40	
Transport helicopters
Changhe Z-8	China	Heavy transport	Z-8A/B/L	135	
Mil Mi-17	Soviet Union	Medium transport	Mi-171	140	
Sikorsky S-70	United States	Medium transport	S-70C2	19	
Harbin Z-20	China	Medium transport		150	
HC120 Colibri	France / China	Light transport		15	
Changhe Z-11	China	Light transport		53	
Fixed-wing transports
Xian Y-7	China	Transport		2	
Shaanxi Y-8	China	Tactical transport		2	
Shaanxi Y-9	China	Transport		2	
UAVs
Guizhou BZK-007	China	MALE UAV			
CASC BZK-008	China				
Aisheng BZK-006	China				
Harbin BZK-005	China	MALE UAV			
Shenyang BZK-009	China				
CASC CH-4B	China	HALE UAV		5+	
