= Harbin Z-21 =

Chinese attack helicopter

The Harbin Z-21 (Chinese: 直-21) is a type of heavy-weight, twin-turboshaft, attack helicopters based on the Harbin Z-20 airframe. Produced by the Harbin Aircraft Industry Group (HAIG), the helicopter was first observed in China in March 2024. The United States Army University estimated that Z-21 would be inducted to the People's Liberation Army Ground Force Aviation (PLAGF) service in around late 2027.

== Description ==
The Z-21 has a tail section and rotor configuration similar to the Harbin Z-20, but with a thinner fuselage. A tandem cockpit replaces the side-by-side seating cockpit on the original. In front of the cockpit, an electro-optical/infrared (EO/IR) sensor turret is fitted, while an autocannon is mounted below. A cheek fairing is added for additional ammunition and avionics. A millimeter-wave (mmW) radar is mounted on top of the rotor mast, with VHF/UHF communication antennas, satellite communication antennas, laser warning receivers (LWR), radar warning receivers (RWR), and a missile approach warning system (MAWS) mounted around the fuselage. The helicopter is fitted with two WZ-10 engines, rated at 1,790 kW (2,400 shp) each with the exhaust direction changed to upward-facing to reduce the infrared signature.

According to Janes Information Services, at an estimated maximum takeoff weight of 10–12 t (22,000–26,000 lb) (in the same class as the AH-64E Apache and the Mi-28), The heavy-weight Z-21 allows the airframe to provide better protection and heavier payload than China's previous Changhe Z-10 helicopters, complementing the latter. Four hard points are fitted under the stub wings, while two more are mounted on the wingtips, for a total of six, which is more than the four hardpoints on the Z-10. Other than the stub wings, the Z-21 features hardpoints underneath the fuselage for carrying external fuel tanks, extending the helicopter's range and on-station endurance, which would be critical in a contested environment without forward arming and refuelling point (FARP).

== Specifications (Z-21) ==
Data from Popular Mechanics, Janes, Defence Security Asia

General characteristics

- Crew: 2
- Length: 16 m (52 ft 6 in)
- Height: 3.86 m (12 ft 8 in)
- Empty weight: 5,200 kg (11,464 lb)
- Max takeoff weight: 10,000 kg (22,046 lb)
- Powerplant: 2 × WZ-10 turboshaft engines, 1,790 kW (2,400 hp) each
- Main rotor diameter: × 13.35 m (43 ft 10 in)

Performance

- Combat range: 650 km (400 mi, 350 nmi)
- Service ceiling: 6,250 m (20,510 ft) (approx.)
- Rate of climb: 13 m/s (2,500 ft/min)

Armament

- Guns: 1x 30 mm (1.181 in) auto cannon
- Hardpoints: 6 hardpoints on two stub wings , with provisions to carry combinations of:
  - Rockets:
    - Various rocket pods
  - Missiles:
    - AKD-9 laser-guided air-to-surface missile
    - AKD-10 laser-guided air-to-surface missile
    - CM-502KG or CM-502V NLOS air-to-surface missile
    - CM-501GA NLOS air-to-surface missile
    - CM-501XA loitering munition
    - TY-90 air-to-air missile
  - Other: 500kg drop tank

Avionics
EO/IR sensors

== See also ==
Related development

- Harbin Z-20

Aircraft of comparable role, configuration, and era

- AgustaWestland Apache
- Bell AH-1Z Viper
- Boeing AH-64 Apache
- Leonardo Helicopters AW249 Fenice
- Mil Mi-28 Havoc
- Kamov Ka-52 Alligator

Related lists

- List of active Chinese military aircraft
- List of Chinese aircraft
