= Type 076 landing helicopter dock =

Class of amphibious assault ship

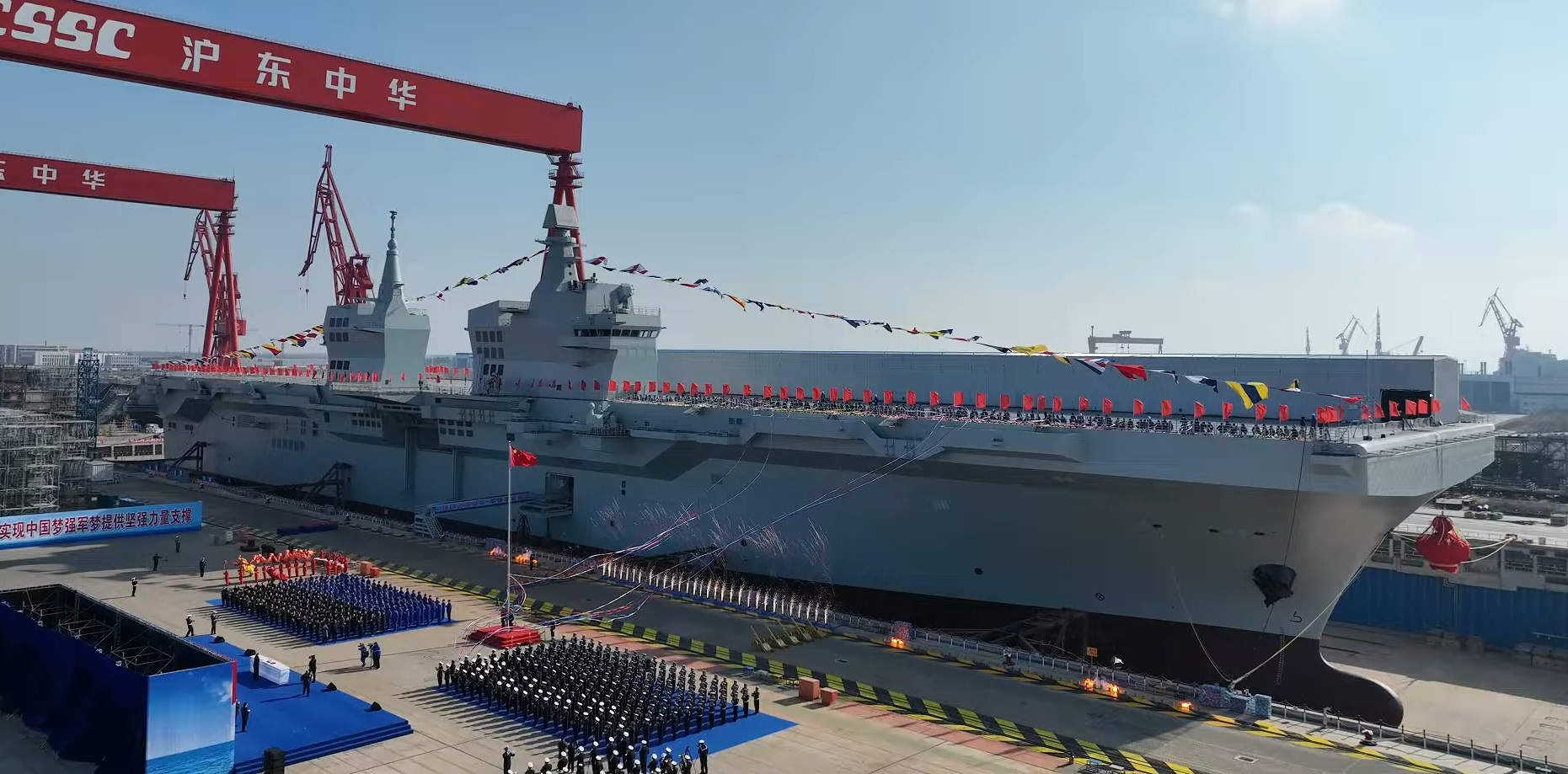
- The launch ceremony of the lead ship Chinese landing helicopter dock Sichuan

Class overview
- Builders: Hudong-Zhonghua Shipyard
- Operators: People's Liberation Army Navy
- Preceded by: Type 075 landing helicopter dock
- Built: 2023–present
- Completed: 1

General characteristics
- Type: Amphibious assault ship; Drone carrier
- Displacement: 50,000 t (49,000 long tons) (full load)
- Length: 252.3 m (828 ft) -- 260 m (850 ft) (o/a)
- Beam: 45 m (148 ft) -- 52 m (171 ft) (o/a)
- Installed power: 2 × 21 MW gas turbine; 6 × 6 MW diesel; Total: 78 MW (105,000 shp); Integrated power system
- Propulsion: IEP
- Boats & landing craft carried: 2 × Type 726 Yuyi class LCAC
- Troops: Over 1,000 marines
- Armament: 3 × Type 1130 CIWS; 3 × 24 round HHQ-10 SAM
- Aircraft carried: Helicopters; UCAVs
- Aviation facilities: Flight deck; Hangar deck; Electromagnetic catapult; Arresting gear

The Type 076 landing helicopter dock (NATO reporting name: Yulan-class landing helicopter assault), also known as the Type 076 amphibious assault ship (Chinese: 076型两栖攻击舰) in its native China, is an upcoming class of amphibious assault ship serving the People's Liberation Army Navy (PLAN). Compared to the preceding Type 075, the Type 076 is significantly larger in both displacement and flight deck dimensions.

It features a twin-island design superstructure, a stern well dock, a CATOBAR system of electromagnetic catapult, and arresting gears for operating light fixed-wing aircraft — likely unmanned combat aerial vehicles (UCAV) such as the GJ-21, making it both a landing helicopter dock (LHD) and a drone carrier. The Type 076 is the world's first amphibious assault ship and drone carrier designed with an electromagnetic catapult.

== Development ==
In mid-2020, official request for proposals (RFP) associated with the Type 076 were published by the Chinese military. Specifications from the RFPs were for a 21 MW gas turbine and diesel powerplants, a medium-voltage direct current integrated power system, and a well deck. The specified aviation equipment included a UAV deck, a munition elevator, a 30-ton flight deck elevator, and an electromagnetic CATOBAR system for light aircraft.

The lead ship of this class was constructed at Shanghai-based Hudong-Zhonghua shipyard since October 2023 and was initially expected to be launched in early 2025. In December 2024, the lead ship was launched, with pennant number 51 and name Sichuan. In October 2025, Sichuan tested its carried electromagnetic catapult in port, suggested by video evidence circulated on social media and mariner notices of a no-entry zone in front of the ship. In November 2025, Sichuan started sea trials. In December 2025, Sichuan conducted the second sea trials.

Video released by CCTV of Sichuan's launch
- https://www.youtube.com/watch?v=utMO_tFdivU

In January 2026, a mock-up of the navalized GJ-21 stealth drone was spotted on the deck of the Type 075. Video evidence showed tugboats moving the ship, indicating subsequent sea trials impending. In February 2026, the ship left the port for sea trials while carrying to the GJ-21 mockup. In April 2026, the lead ship Sichuan joined a naval exercise in the South China Sea to test system capabilities and train personnel.

In July 2026, video footage released by Chinese state media showed the superstructures of the Type 076 lead ship Sichuan had been completed, deck markings had been applied, and arresting cables installed. Janes Information Services expected the delivery date for Sichuan in 2027. In August 2026, new footage of electromagnetic catapult testing at sea was released by Chinese media.

On 30 October 2026, the People's Liberation Army announced that the Type 076 has successfully conducted its first CATOBAR (catapult-assisted take-off but arrested recovery) operations in October, launching and recovering the autonomous combat aircraft, the Hongdu GJ-21. Satellite images showed additional markings on Sichuan's deck before the maiden flight, land-based test launches for the GJ-21 prior, and that the ship left port between 13 October and 26 October.

== Design ==
The Type 076 has a full-length flight deck, an internal hangar, two large aircraft elevators on both sides, and one small elevator at the front deck section. The ship is intended to operate naval helicopters, such as the Changhe Z-8, Z-10, Z-18, Harbin Z-9, Z-21, etc. It could also operate unmanned aerial vehicles (UAV), especially capable of supporting fixed wing types, such as WZ-7 and GJ-11. The ship could also accommondate manned fixed-wing aircraft such as the Shenyang J-35 and Xian KJ-600.

Fixed-wing aircraft and UAVs can be launched via an electromagnetic catapult similar in size to the one mounted on the Type 003 aircraft carrier. An arresting gear is fitted on the aft-deck to facilitate the fixed-wing aircraft landing. A floodable well deck is located at its stern, capable of launching amphibious vehicles for landing operations.

The main propulsion of the class appears to employ a gas turbine setup. For this reason, the ship has a "twin-island" superstructure configuration that allows one superstructure dedicated to navigation while the other one focusing on flight operations. Multiple air defense and countermeasure systems are mounted around the ship, including three Type 1130 close-in weapon system (CIWS) turrets, three HHQ-10 short-range surface-to-air missile batteries, and four countermeasure launchers loaded with flares, chaff and sonar decoys.

Type 076 is larger than the preceding Type 075 amphibious assault ship. The overall tonnage of the ship was estimated as 50,000 tonnes (49,000 long tons) at full displacement by the Center for Strategic and International Studies. Chinese state media states that the ship has a displacement of "above 40,000 tonnes (39,000 long tons)".

== List of ships ==
Pennant number	Name	Namesake	Builder	Launched	Commissioned	Status
51	Chinese landing helicopter dock Sichuan / 四川	Province of Sichuan	Hudong-Zhonghua, Shanghai	27 December 2024	2026 (estimated)	Sea trials

== See also ==
- TCG Anadolu
- People's Liberation Army Navy Surface Force
- List of active People's Liberation Army Navy ships
