= List of unmanned aerial vehicles of China =

This is a list of unmanned aerial vehicles of China.

Chinese companies are leaders in the global civilian drone industry and China is the second largest drone market in the world, after the United States. In late of 2010, there were more than a hundred Chinese UAV developers/manufacturers. Chinese manufacturer DJI held three-quarters of consumer market share in 2017. In 2018, DJI was dominant, followed by Chinese company Yuneec, US company 3D Robotics and French company Parrot.

== List ==
- Aisheng ASN-205
- Aisheng ASN-206
- Aisheng ASN-207
- Aisheng ASN-209
- Aisheng BZK-006
- Aisheng DCK-006
- Aisheng JWP01
- Aisheng JWP02
- Aisheng Silver Eagle
- Aisheng WZ-6
- Antigravity A1
- AVIC AR-2000
- Autel Evo
- AVIC Dark Sword
- AVIC WZ-8
- CAIG Wing Loong family
- CAIG Wing Loong II
- CAIG Wing Loong III
- CASC Rainbow family
- CASC CH-901
- CASIC HW-600 Sky Hawk (WJ-600)
- CASIC HW-610
- CASIC WJ-010
- CASIC WJ-100 Blade
- CASIC WJ-500
- CASIC WJ-600 A/D
- ChangKong-2
- Chengdu WZ-10
- DJI Agras
- DJI Air
- DJI Avata
- DJI Flame Wheel
- DJI Flip
- DJI FlyCart
- DJI Inspire
- DJI Lito
- DJI Matrice
- DJI Mavic
- DJI Mini
- DJI Neo
- DJI Phantom
- DJI Spark
- DJI Spreading Wings
- Ehang Ghost
- Ehang Hexacopter
- Feihong FH-97
- Feihong FH-97A
- FL-71
- Guizhou WZ-7 Soaring Dragon
- Harbin BZK-005
- Hongdu GJ-11
- Hongdu GJ-21
- Hubsan X4
- MD-22
- Mugin UAV Mugin
- Nanjing CK-1
- Nine Heavens
- Ryze Tello
- Shenyang BA-5
- Shenyang J-6W
- Star UAV System Star Shadow
- SYAC Divine Eagle
- SYAC Spider-Man ZZX
- SYAC XLB Patroller
- Tengden TB-001
- V750 UAV
- WZ-5
- Yuneec International Typhoon H

== See also ==
- List of Chinese aircraft
- List of Chinese aircraft engines
- List of unmanned aerial vehicles
