= Aisheng ASN-209 =

Type of aircraft

ASN-209 UAV
- Chinese ASN-209 system

General information
- Type: Reconnaissance UAV
- National origin: China
- Manufacturer: Xi’an ASN Technology Group / CATIC / AOI
- Status: Active, in production
- Primary users: People's Liberation Army Algerian Air Force; Egyptian armed forces

ASN-209 UAV and its derivative are Chinese UAVs developed by Xi'an Aisheng Technology Group Co., Ltd (西安爱生技术集团公司) ASN Technology Group Co., Ltd (西安爱生技术集团公司), also known as Northwestern Polytechnical University UAV Research Institute or 365th Institute, established in 1984.

== History ==
The Silver Eagle or Silver Hawk (Yin-Ying or Yinying, 银鹰) are a derivative or alternative name for the ASN-209 deployed by Chinese military. The most obvious visual difference between Silver Eagle and its predecessor, ASN-209, is the addition of four vertically installed antennas, two of which are arranged in sequential order atop the fuselage, and one each on the wing, near the wingtip. The estimated range is around 150 km (93 mi), and the estimated endurance is several hours. Maiden flight of Silver Eagle took place in the coastal region of northeastern China on 1 June 2011 and lasted 3.5 hours.

The UAV entered service with the Chinese Navy.

Silver Eagle is launched from a 6 x 6 truck, which is both the launching platform and transportation vehicle, and the UAV utilizes rocket-assisted take-off. Presumably, there would be at least another vehicle housing the ground control station. Very little information has been publicized by the official Chinese government sources, which only reveal (as of 2014) that Silver Eagle is a shore-based naval UAV. There are postulates that Silver Eagle can either act as a communication relay or electronic intelligence gathering platform, or as an aerial jamming platform, but such claims have yet to be confirmed.

== ASN-209 ==
ASN-209 is designed for Medium Altitude Medium Endurance (MAME) tactical missions.

=== Design ===
ASN-209 Tactical UAV System is composed of Aircraft Platform, Avionics, Airborne Mission Payload, Data Link, Ground Control Station and Launch and Recovery Equipment, ASN-209 UAV can perform aerial reconnaissance, battle field survey, target location, destroy validation and artillery fire adjustment in day and night in real time. ASN-209 uses digital flight control and navigation system, its flight control mode has manual, program and emergency control. In addition, ASN-209 uses rocket booster launch, parachute recovery which render the operating system of ASN-209 flexible due to the fact that no contact with an airport is needed, and the GCS allows multitasking and can be edited in real-time. In civil application, it can be fitted with Synthetic Aperture Radar (SAR), electro-optical payload, and multi-function payload, etc. that can be applied for forest fire prevention, anti-drug action, communication, nature disaster forecast, ground observation, atmosphere measuring, aviation photo, resource detection, climate observation and artificial raining, etc.

In military operations, it can be with multiple operational configurations for Ground Moving Target Indication (GMTI), Electronic Intelligence (ELINT), Electronic Warfare (EW), Ground Target Designation (GTD), and Communication Relay.

ASN-209 uses a twin-boom pusher layout, rear-installed engine disposition with high-set wings and a stabilizer linking the twin fins. Excellent overall aerodynamic design and EMC design enable the system to install many different kinds of airborne equipment, such as Electronic countermeasures (ECM), communication relay and weather detection. With a coverage radius of 200 km (120 mi) and an endurance of 10 hours, the ASN-209 UAV System can supervise a large area and frontier within one sortie. To overcome the refueling issue, use two UAVs and switch them out when one reaches its 10-hour limit so that they can be used for 24 hours consecutively.

The practicality of the ASN-209 system reduces the need for maintenance or parts from China, as ASN-209 can be deployed using a modified truck and is controlled using electronic equipment installed in a cargo van, which in turn overcomes the disadvantage of comparable US UAVs that depend on US parts and maintenance.

=== Development ===
The ASN-209 was developed in 2011 by ASN Technology Group, which is a Chinese company specializing in Unmanned Aerial Vehicle (UAV). Egypt and China had signed an agreement to build twelve ASN-209 UAVs including technology transfer in order to enhance Egypt's domestic drone industry. In addition, China uses fewer proprietary technologies in their designs in order to reduce licensing and manufacturing costs, as the ASN-209 system costs 30 percent less than comparable US designs while providing many of the same performance and most of the same tasks.

In May 2012 six Egyptian drones of ASN-209 was built in collaboration with a foreign defence manufacturer during the first phase and are fully operational under the Egyptian armed forces according to Hamdy Weheba, the Chairman of the Arab Organization for Industrialization which he claimed that Egypt has started the production of the ASN-209 Multi-purpose UAV System and about 99.5% of the components are locally manufactured. He also claimed that with the latest manufacturing venture, Egypt is entering into the second phase of mass ASN-209 production.

== Operators ==
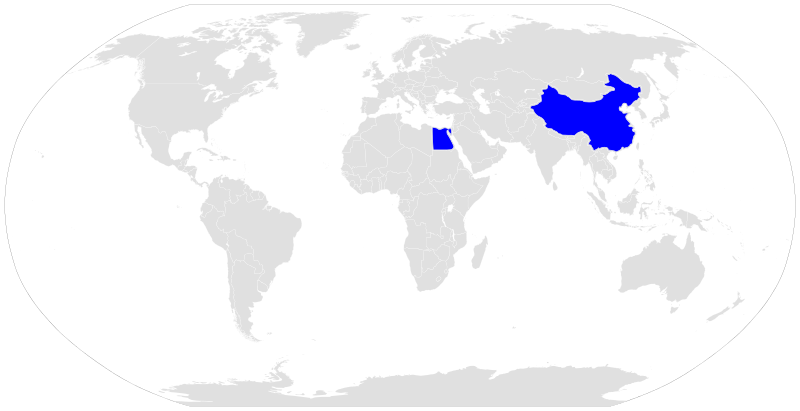
ASN-209 operators

China

- People's Liberation Army

Algeria

- Algerian Air Force

Egypt

- Egyptian armed forces

== Specifications ==
Data from

General characteristics

- Crew: None
- Capacity: 50 kg
- Length: 4.273 m (14 ft 0 in)
- Wingspan: 7.5 m (24 ft 7 in)
- Height: 1.539 m (5 ft 1 in)
- Max takeoff weight: 320 kg (705 lb)

Performance

- Maximum speed: 180 km/h (110 mph, 97 kn)
- Cruise speed: 140 km/h (87 mph, 76 kn)
- Combat range: 200 km (120 mi, 110 nmi)
- Endurance: 10 h
- Service ceiling: 5,000 m (16,000 ft)

== See also ==
- ScanEagle
- List of unmanned aerial vehicles of the People's Republic of China
