= Star UAV System Star Shadow =

Stealth unmanned combat aerial vehicle

Star Shadow is a stealthy flying wing unmanned combat aerial vehicle developed by the Chinese company Star UAV System. It will have a maximum take-off weight (MTOW) of 4,000 kg with a truncated diamond-shaped airframe 7.3 m long, with sweptback outer wings that have a total span of 15 m. It is powered by TWS800 small turbofan engines. Endurance is 12 hours and the ceiling is 15,000 m.

== See also ==
Related lists

- List of unmanned aerial vehicles of China
