= China Aerospace Studies Institute =

U.S. military think tank

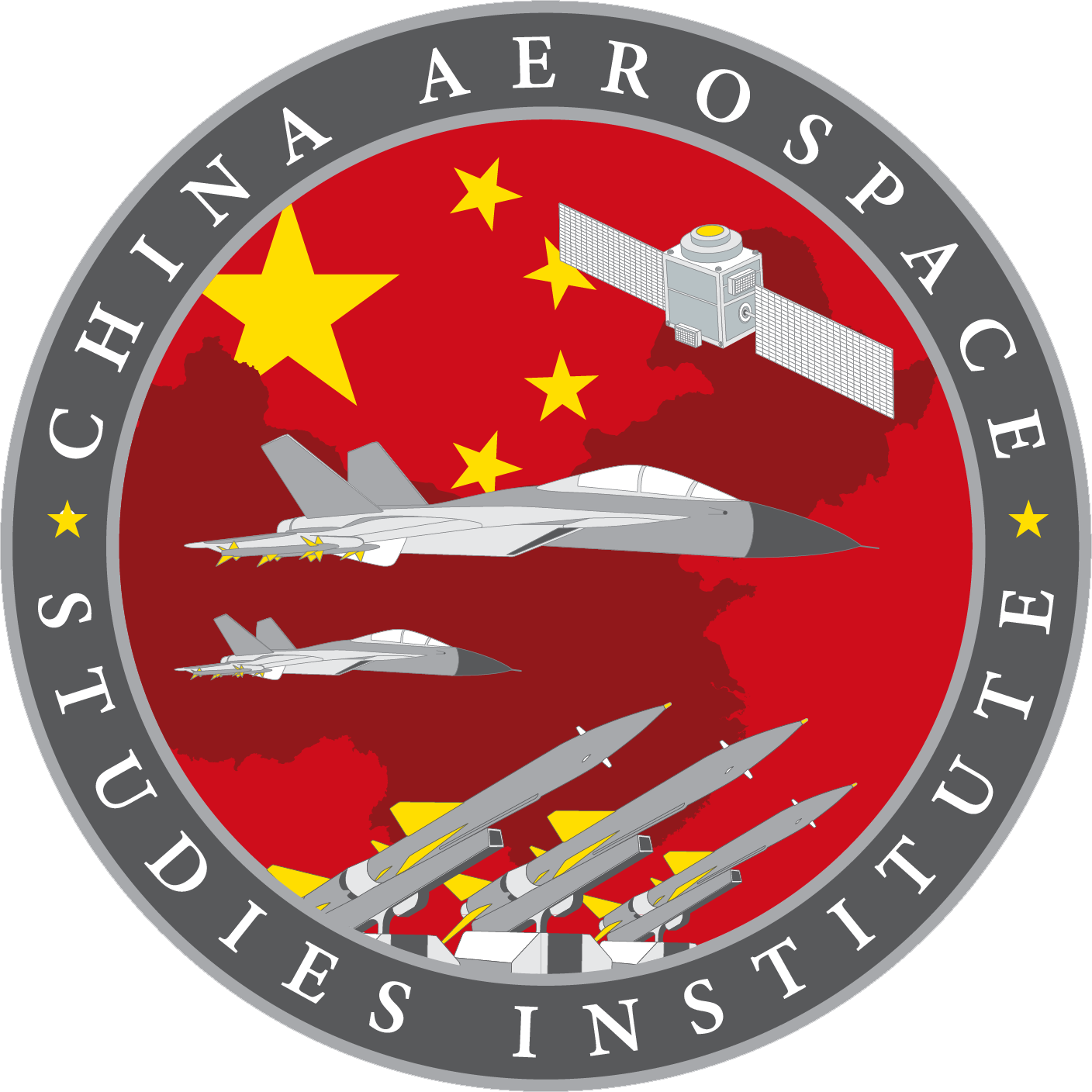
- Seal of the institute

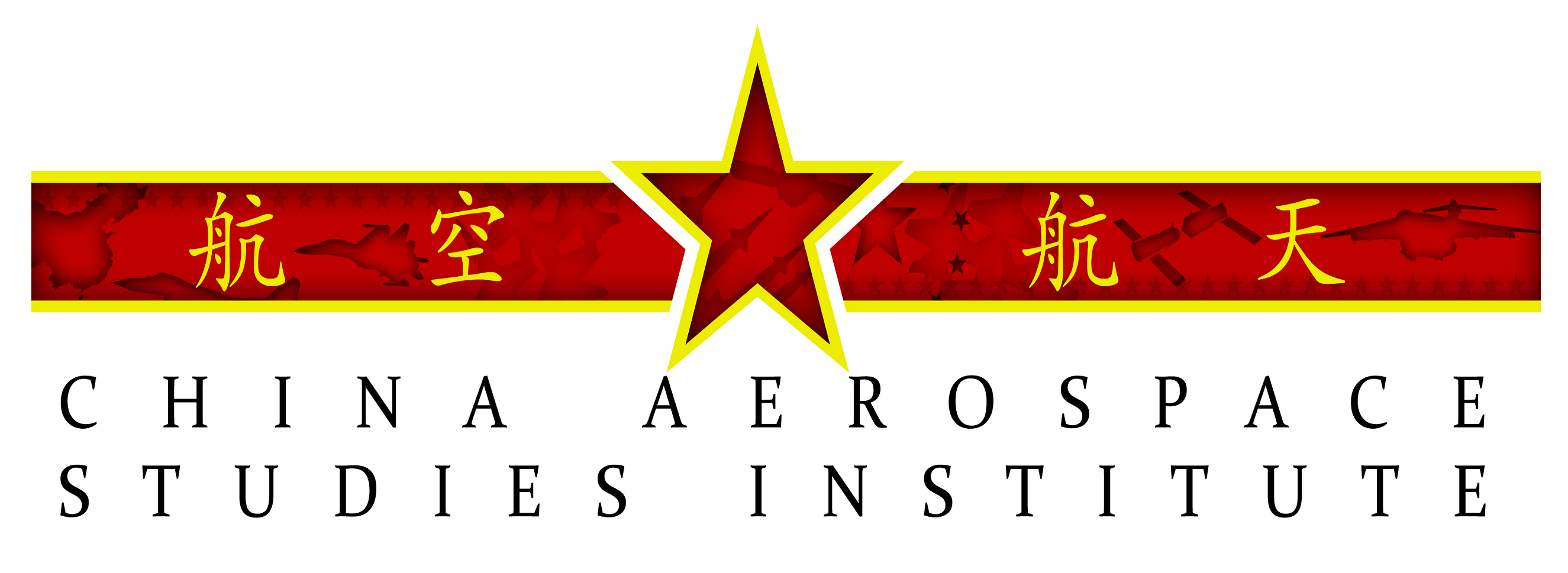
- Logo of the institute (航空航天: Aerospace)

Institute overview
- Formed: 2017 (chartered July 2021)
- Type: Defense strategy think tank
- Headquarters: Maxwell Air Force Base, Montgomery, Alabama
- Motto: "Advancing the understanding of China's aerospace forces"
- Institute executives: Brendan Mulvaney, Director; Lt Col Justin Settles, Deputy Director
- Parent department: Department of the Air Force
- Parent institution: Air University
- Website: www.airuniversity.af.edu/CASI

The China Aerospace Studies Institute (CASI) is a United States Department of the Air Force think tank which examines the People's Republic of China and Chinese Communist Party's efforts to project power in the air and space domains. It is a research unit of Air University producing classified and open-source research for government customers and the public.

In September 2026, the Air Force announced that it would not reauthorize funding for CASI's civilian employees for fiscal year 2027, starting October 1. A note on the institute's website stated that it would close, but that it intends to honor commitments and produce reports through March 2027.

== History ==
The China Aerospace Studies Institute began in 2017 as a resource to examine Chinese aerospace power projection. It was officially chartered by General Charles Q. Brown Jr. in July 2021, in order to increase awareness of Chinese aerospace capabilities, and "learn what makes them tick" as competition between the United States and China has increased.

== Mission ==
The mission of the institute is to advance understanding of the capabilities, development, operating concepts, strategy, doctrine, personnel, organization, and limitations of China's aerospace forces, including:

- PLA Air Force (PLAAF)
- PLA Aerospace Force (PLAASF)
- PLA Rocket Force (PLARF)
- PLA Cyberspace Force (PLACSF)
- PLA Naval Aviation (PLANAF)
- PLA Army Aviation (PLAGFAF)
- PLA Strategic Support Force (PLASSF; defunct since 2024)

as well as the civilian and commercial infrastructure that supports all of the preceding units.

CASI supports the secretary of the Air Force, Joint Chiefs of Staff, and other senior leaders of the Air and Space Forces. CASI provides expert research and analysis supporting decision and policy makers in the Department of Defense and across the U.S. government.

== Key functions ==
CASI accomplishes its mission through conducting the following activities:

- CASI primarily conducts open-source native-language research supporting its five main topic areas.
- CASI conducts conferences, workshops, roundtables, subject matter expert panels, and senior leader discussions to further its mission. CASI personnel attend such events, government, academic, and public, in support of its research and outreach efforts.
- CASI publishes research findings and papers, journal articles, monographs, and edited volumes for both public and government-only distribution as appropriate.
- CASI establishes and maintains institutional relationships with organizations and institutions in the PLA, the People's Republic of China writ large, and with partners and allies involved in the region.
- CASI maintains the ability to support senior leaders and policy decision makers across the full spectrum of topics and projects at all levels, related to Chinese aerospace.

CASI supports the U.S. Defense Department and the China research community writ-large by providing unclassified research on Chinese aerospace developments in the context of U.S. strategic imperatives in the Asia-Pacific region. Primarily focused on China's Military Air, Space, and Missile Forces, CASI capitalizes on publicly available native language resources to gain insights as to how the Chinese speak to and among one another on these topics.

== See also ==
- China and weapons of mass destruction
