= Sichuan Tengden =

Chinese aircraft manufacturer

Sichuan Tengden Technology, previously known as Tengoen Technology and Tengdun Technology is a privately owned drone manufacturing company that specializes in the development and manufacturing of medium-to-large unmanned aerial systems for military and civilian applications.

Sichuan Tengden Science and Technology is wholly owned, via direct and indirect ownership, by Sichuan Tengden Science Innovation Joint Stock Limited Company (四川腾盾科创股份有限公司). Through their investments, the Fujian provincial and Guangxi Zhuang Autonomous Region governments control the two largest ownership stakes in Sichuan Tengden Science Innovation Joint Stock Limited Company. The third largest share of Sichuan Tengden Science Innovation Joint Stock Limited Company is an investment partnership controlled by individuals outside of either Sichuan Tengden company. However, this investment partnership is partially owned by individuals within Sichuan Tengden companies, via minority ownership stakes. An investment partnership that maintains far less ownership of the company is also around 30 percent owned by a group of Sichuan Tengden Science and Technology Co., Ltd. And Sichuan Tengden Science Innovation Joint Stock Limited Company executives and board members. Furthermore, according to China Aerospace Studies Institute, Sichuan Tengden Science and Technology Co., Ltd. Founder Nie Haitao (聂海涛) directly owns around two percent of Sichuan Tengden Science Innovation Joint Stock Limited Company.

== Products ==
At the 2018 Zhuhai Airshow, Tengden displayed a full-size mockup of the Tengden TB-001 (TW-356) twin-engine unmanned aerial system designed for the transportation of heavy cargo. TW356 can be configured to carry cargo on four underwing hardpoints, as payloads configured in pods, including cargo delivery, remote sensing, or electronic warfare packages. The company also develops a variant of the drone designed for operation at very high altitudes. The largest variant, TW-765, will be able to carry 22 tons of payload up to 7,500 km.

Other products include the TA001 "Striking Hawk" fixed-wing UAV and HA001 and HB001 VTOL UAVs.
