= ChangKong-2 =

1990s Chinese aircraft

CK-2

General information
- Type: Target Drone
- National origin: People's Republic of China (PRC)
- Manufacturer: Nanjing

History
- Introduction date: 1990s

The ChangKong-2 is a supersonic target drone developed by the People's Republic of China in the late 1990s.

== Operators ==
People's Republic of China

- People's Liberation Army Air Force

== Specifications ==
Data from

General characteristics

- Crew: 0
- Wingspan: 7.6 m (24 ft 11 in)
- Height: 2.96 m (9 ft 9 in)
- Gross weight: 2,500 kg (5,512 lb)

Performance

- Maximum speed: 910 km/h (570 mph, 490 kn)
- Range: 937 km (582 mi, 506 nmi)
- Endurance: 45 minutes
- Service ceiling: 59,000 m (194,000 ft)

== See also ==
Related lists

- List of unmanned aerial vehicles of China
