= Tengden TB-001 =

Chinese unmanned aerial vehicle

TB-001
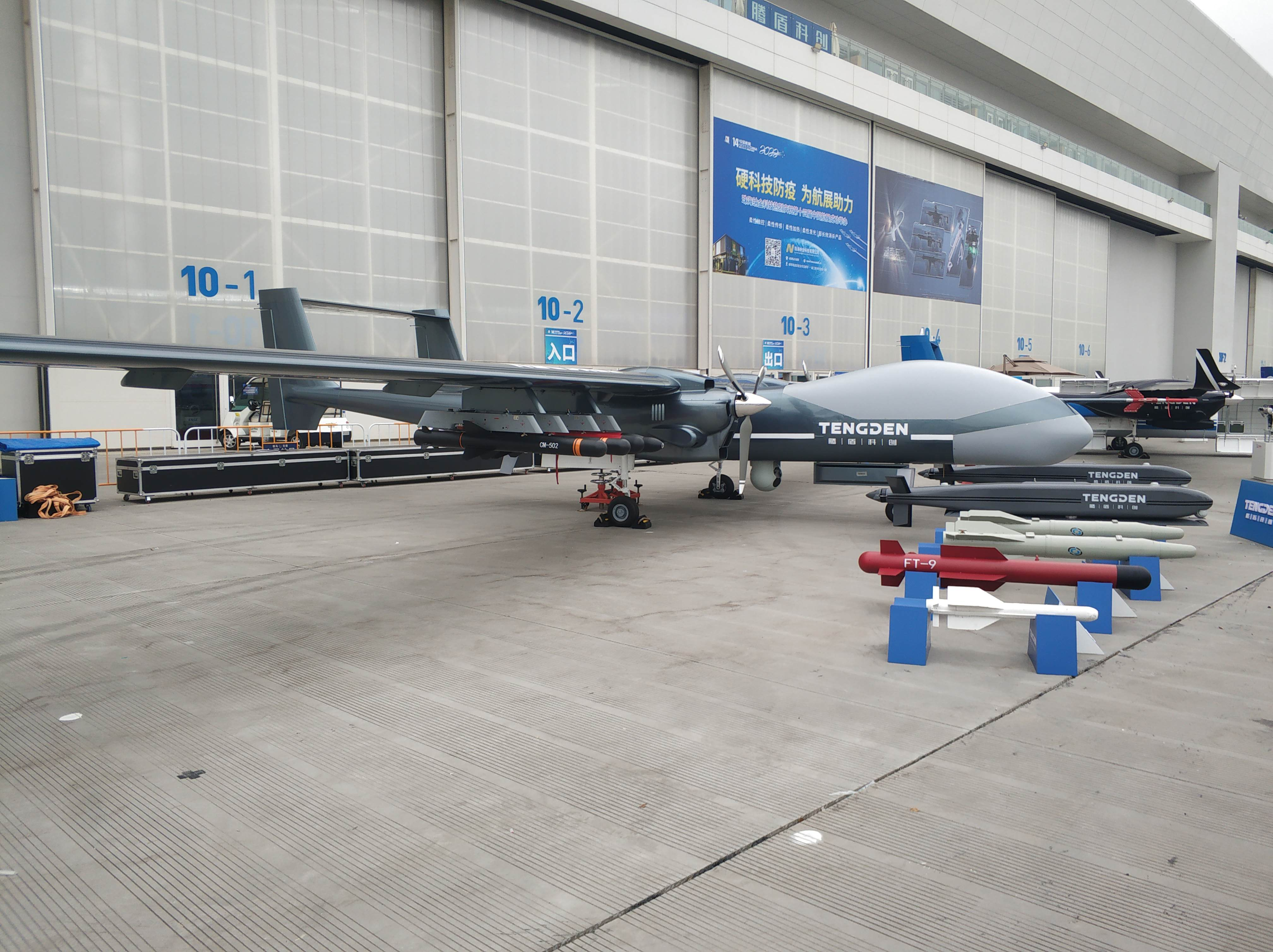
- TB-001 on Zhuhai Airshow 2022

General information
- Type: Medium-altitude long-endurance unmanned aerial vehicle
- National origin: China
- Manufacturer: Sichuan Tengden
- Designer: Koen Lee Choi
- Primary user: People's Liberation Army

The Tengden TB-001 is a medium-altitude long-endurance (MALE) unmanned combat aerial vehicle (UCAV) designed by Sichuan Tengden. It is used by the People's Liberation Army.

== Development ==
The TB-001 was first unveiled in September 2017.

In 2020, the three-engined variant of the TB-001 was unveiled, reportedly taking less than six months to develop.

== Design ==
The TB-001 uses a twin-boom design. It has a pair of turbocharged-piston engines, each driving a three-bladed propeller on either side of the central fuselage, underneath a straight high-mounted wing.

== Operational history ==
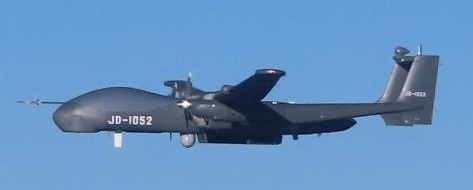
TB-001 spotted by JASDF in the East China Sea (2024)

In August 2021, the TB-001 was twice spotted in the East China Sea by the Japan Maritime Self-Defense Force. In the first encounter, the TB-001 flew over the East China Sea unaccompanied, and in the second encounter it flew through the Miyako Strait alongside two Shaanxi Y-9 aircraft.

== Variants ==
TB-001: Base variant.

TB-001A: Developed from the original TB-001. Upgraded with an additional engine on the tail. Maximum takeoff weight increased from 2,800 kilograms of the original TB-001 to 3,200 kilograms (7,100 lb), payload from 1,200 kilograms to 1,500 kilograms (3,300 lb), and flight ceiling from 8,000 metres to 9,500 metres (9,000 m sustained). Takeoff distance is shortened to 500 metres and has maximum rate of climb of over 10 metres per second (33 ft/s; 2,000 ft/min). The maximum flight endurance is 35 hours, the same as TB-001.

== Operators ==
China

== Specifications ==
General characteristics

- Crew: None
- Capacity: 1,200 kg (2,646 lb) payload
- Length: 10 m (32 ft 10 in)
- Wingspan: 20 m (65 ft 7 in)
- Height: 3.3 m (10 ft 10 in)
- Max takeoff weight: 2,800 kg (6,173 lb)

Performance

- Range: 6,000 km (3,700 mi, 3,200 nmi)
- Endurance: 35 hours with 1,000 kg payload
- Service ceiling: 8,000 m (26,000 ft)

Armament

- 4 hardpoints
- 250 kg laser-guided bomb, FT-7 glide bomb, FT-9 guided bomb
- AR-4 air-to-surface missile, AR-3 cruise missile, FT-8D, FT-10 air-to ground missiles

Avionics

- 280 km communication range with line of sight ground command post, 3,000 km communication range with satellite communication data links

== See also ==
- CAIG Wing Loong
- CAIG Wing Loong II
- CAIG Wing Loong-10
- CASC Rainbow
- Harbin BZK-005
- CASIC WJ
- TAI Aksungur

Related lists

- List of aircraft produced by China
- List of unmanned aerial vehicles of China
