= CASIC HW-600 series UAV =

UAVs

General information
- Type: UAV
- National origin: China
- Manufacturer: CASIC
- Designer: CASIC
- Status: In service
- Primary user: China

History
- Introduction date: early 2010s
- First flight: early 2010s

CASIC HW-600 series unmanned aerial vehicles are Chinese UAVs developed by 3rd Academy Hiwing (or HW for short, 海鹰in Chinese) of China Aerospace Science and Industry Corporation (CASIC), and this academy is also more commonly known as HiWING Mechanical and Electrical Technology Corp, (海鹰机电技术研究院, the exact literal translation of its Chinese name is actually Sea Eagle Mechanical and Electrical Technology Research Academy) or HiWING for short.

== HW-600 Sky Hawk (WJ-600) ==
HW-600 Sky Hawk (Tian-Yi or Tianying, 天鹰), this HiWING developed UAV is a jet-powered UCAV. The turbojet powered HW-600 Sky Hawk has a conventional layout with high-wing configuration and small winglets. The engine is in the aft section of the cylindrical fuselage, and the inlet is atop of the fuselage at the root of the single vertical tail fin. There is a single hardpoint under each wing, which is designed to carry a variety of Chinese UAV employed missiles and other munitions. Sensors are presumably stored in the bulbous nose. Also known as WJ-600, there are Chinese internet claims that HW-600 is the designation for the unarmed reconnaissance version, while WJ-600 is the designation for the armed UCAV version. However, such unconfirmed claims have yet to be verified by official governmental / industrial / independent sources. Reportedly, WJ is short for Wu-Jian (无歼), short for Wu-Ren Jian-Ji-Ji (无人歼击机), meaning unmanned fighter because MANPADs can be deployed by this UCAV as air-to-air missiles. Specification:

- Speed: 200 m/s
- Ceiling: 10 km
- Operational range: 2100 km
- Launch: rocket
- Recovery: parachute
- Payload: 130 kg
- Endurance: 3–5 hr

== HW-610 ==
CASIC HW-610 is an UCAV powered by jet. In addition to carrying out traditional reconnaissance missions, the UAV can also be armed to perform ground attack mission. HW-610 is a development of the unarmed version of earlier HW(WJ)-600 and shares the similar design layout. There are two hardpoints with one under each wing to carry missiles for land attack missions. Specification:

- Length (m): 6.5
- Wingspan (mm): 6.8
- Take-off weight (t): 1
- Payload (kg): 130
- Endurance (h): 3–5
- Speed (km/h): 500–700
- Remote control radius (km): 350
- Max wind scale allowed for operation: 8–9
- Launch: Rocket-assisted take-off
- Recovery: parachute

== Operators ==
- Turkmenistan: an undisclosed number of WJ-600A/D appear to be in service of Turkmenistan air force.

== See also ==
- List of unmanned aerial vehicles of China
