= Harbin BZK-005 =

Type of aircraft

BZK-005
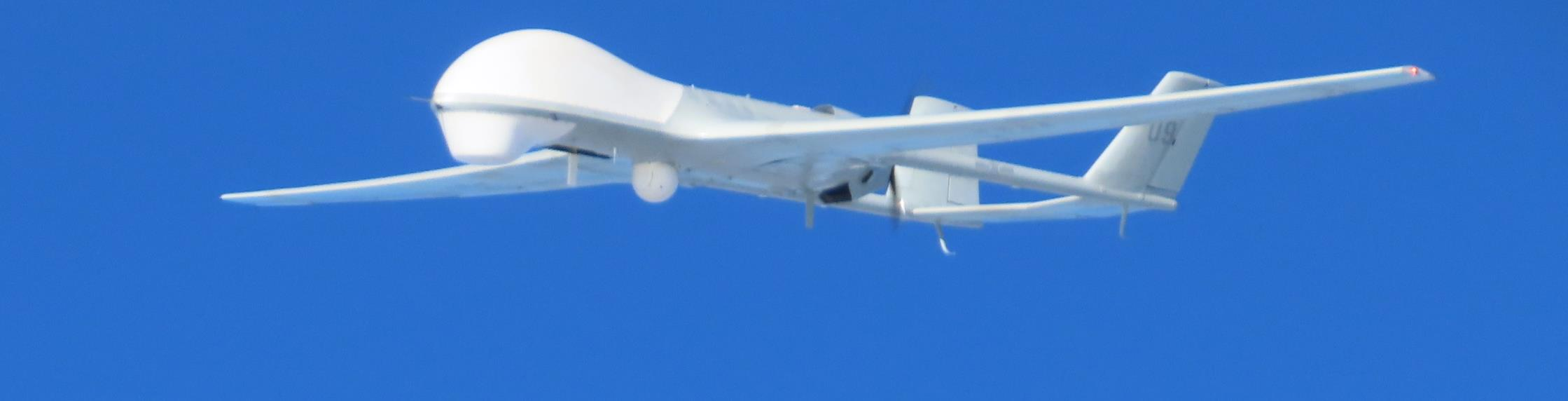

General information
- Type: MALE (Medium altitude long endurance) UAV
- National origin: PRC
- Manufacturer: Harbin Aircraft Industry (Group) Co., Ltd.
- Designer: Harbin Aircraft Industry Group
- Primary user: People's Liberation Army

The BZK-005 Medium-altitude, long-range UAV is a reconnaissance aircraft designed by Harbin Aircraft Industry Group. It is used by the PLA Navy and PLA Air Force.

== Development ==
The BZK-005 was unveiled in Zhuhai International Airshow 2006, where video and models were demonstrated to the public regarding this UAV.

== Design ==
BZK-005 has a few stealth features integrated into its design. It is believed that a satellite data link antenna is held in its large upper body dome. Under the body there is an optic-electric sensor system. It is expected that BZK-005 has cruising speed of around 170 km/h, service ceiling 8,000 m, max takeoff weight is around 1,200 kg, max payload over 150 kg.

== Variants ==
BZK-005: unarmed reconnaissance version.

BZK-005C: Developed from original BZK-005 and optimized aerodynamic structure and electronic system with attack and reconnaissance capability. It can equipped with bombs or missiles with more than 300 kg payload. First revealed by Chinese state media on 11 November 2018.

BZK-005E: Export-oriented variant of the BZK-005 announced in November 2018. Has a maximum take-off-weight (MTOW) of 1,500 kg with a 370 kg payload and an endurance of up to 40 hours, depending on the payload. Marketed as the Sky Saker FX1000A by Norinco.

== Service history ==
The BZK-005 is in service with the People's Liberation Army Navy and People's Liberation Army Air Force.

In August 2011, a BZK-005 crashed into a farm field close to Xingtai, He Bei province. Photos of the wreckage were posted on various Chinese internet websites.

In 2019, Garuda Indonesia purchased 3 BZK-005s for cargo routes between outlying islands in Indonesia.

In April 2019, the BZK-005 was confirmed to be used by the Chinese military in conducting maritime surveillance over the East China Sea. The UAV was intercepted by the Japan Air Self-Defence Force in a scramble alert after violating Japanese air space.

In August 2021, the BZK-005 was spotted over the East China Sea alongside two Y-9s. It was speculated to be an upgraded variant, "specifically configured for wide-area intelligence, surveillance, and reconnaissance (ISR) missions with an undernose synthetic aperture radar (SAR) radome – possibly housing a Ku-band D3010 SAR system with a dual-mode SAR/ground moving target indicator (GMTI) capability – and a mid-mounted ventral electro-optical/infrared (EO/IR) turret."

On the 10 June 2024, the Armed Forces of Mauritania revealed they had received the delivery of the BZK-005E, along with other pieces of Chinese-produced military hardware.

== Operators ==
China

- People's Liberation Army Air Force: 84 units
- People's Liberation Army Naval Air Force: 21 units

Indonesia

- Garuda Indonesia: 3 units

Mauritania

- Mauritania Islamic Air Force 8 units

Sudan

- Rapid Support Forces (alleged)

== Specifications ==
General characteristics

- Crew: None
- Capacity: 150 kg (331 lb) payload
- Length: 9 m (29 ft 6 in)
- Wingspan: 19 m (62 ft 4 in)
- Max takeoff weight: 1,250 kg (2,756 lb)

Performance

- Cruise speed: 150–180 km/h (93–112 mph, 81–97 kn)
- Endurance: 40 hours
- Service ceiling: 8,000 m (26,000 ft)

== See also ==
- CAIG Wing Loong
- CAIG Wing Loong II
- CAIG Wing Loong-10
- CASC Rainbow
- Tengden TB-001
- CASIC WJ

Related lists

- List of Chinese aircraft
- List of unmanned aerial vehicles of the People's Republic of China
