= Aisheng ASN-205 =

Chinese unmanned aerial vehicles

ASN-205 UAV and its follow-ons are Chinese UAVs developed by Xi'an Aisheng Technology Group Co., Ltd (西安爱生技术集团公司) ASN Technology Group Co., Ltd (西安爱生技术集团公司), also known as Northwestern Polytechnical University UAV Research Institute or 365th Institute , established in 1984.

== ASN-205 ==
ASN-205 is a fixed wing UAV that first appeared on September 6, 2009, during the practice parade of the 60th anniversary of parade on October 1, 2009. ASN-205 is intended as the successor of earlier ASN-104/105 series, and is intended mainly to perform missions of drones, while the other UAV, ASN-206, is intended for reconnaissance missions.

== ASN-206 ==
ASN-206
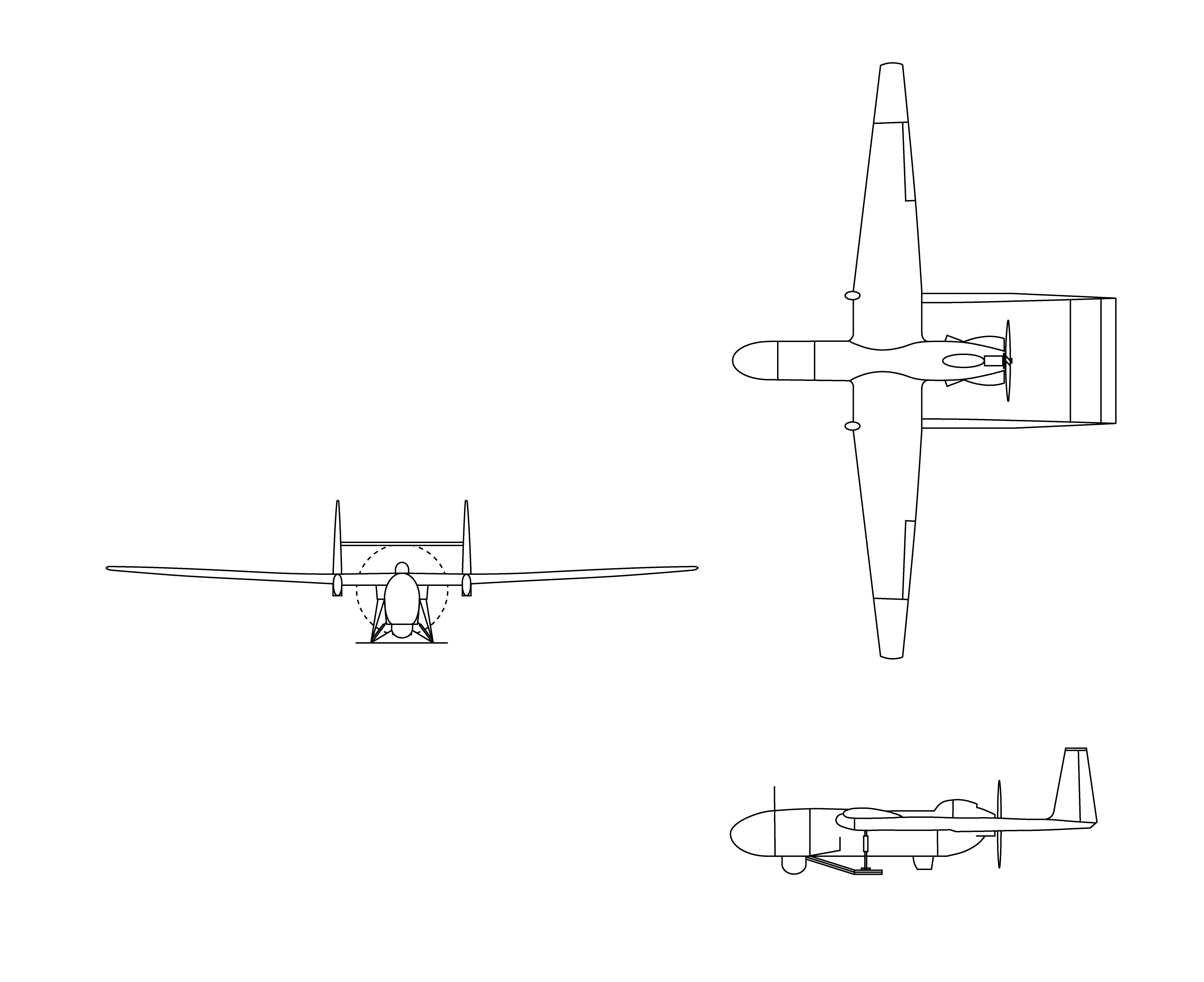
- Developer: Xi'an Aisheng Technology Group Co., Ltd (西安爱生技术集团公司), ASN Technology Group Co., Ltd (西安爱生技术集团公司)
- Type: UAV
- Weight: 222 Kg

ASN-206 is a fixed wing UAV in twin boom layout with high wing configuration with twin-tail. Propulsion is provided by a two-blade propeller driven engine mounted at the rear end of the fuselage. ASN-206 was reportedly developed under the assistance of Tadiran Spectralink Ltd, an Israeli company specialising in the airborne communications and electronic countermeasures (ECM) systems, but this cannot be confirmed. Though classified by Chinese as a lightweight UAV, ASN-206 actually weighs more than 200 kg, and this was mainly caused by the technological bottleneck and limitation of industrial capability China faced back in the early 1990s. In 1996, ASN-206 won State Science and Technology Prizes. Specification:

- Wingspan (m): 6
- Length (m): 3.8
- Height (m): 1.4
- Weight (kg): 222
- Payload (kg): 50 max
- Endurance (hr): 4 – 8
- Max speed (km/h): 210
- Ceiling (km): 6
- Range (km): 150

== JWP01 ==
JWP01 is a fixed wing UAV in twin boom layout with high wing configuration. JWP01 is no longer in production and is in the process of being replaced by its successor JWP02, but some still remain in service. JWP01 is an ASN-206 specially adopted for artillery observation, with an electro-optical sensor payload mounted under the nose.

== ASN-207 ==
ASN-207 is a development of ASN-206 and shares an identical design layout. ASN-207 adopted a new engine and material during its design and construction, enabling it to increase its endurance and payload by doubling that of the original, thanks to the rapid advancement China made in technological and industrial capability. The range is also significantly increased.

- Payload (kg): 100 max
- Endurance (hr): 8 – 16
- Range (km): 600

== WZ-6 ==
WZ-6 is the development of ASN-207 adopted by the Chinese military. WZ = Wu Zhen, 无侦 in Chinese, short for Wu-Ren Zhen-Zha-Ji 无人侦察机 in Chinese, meaning pilotless reconnaissance aircraft. As its designation implies, this UAV is for reconnaissance missions. The most obvious distinction between WZ-6 and the original ASN-207 is the addition of a mushroom-shaped radome installed atop the fuselage, housing the communication antenna. In addition to the electro-optical payload, WZ-6 is also capable of carrying miniature radar to carry out reconnaissance missions.

== JWP02 ==
JWP02 UAV is a derivative of WZ-6 and has already entered service with the Chinese military. The most obvious external visual difference between WZ-6 and JWP02 is that the electro-optical turret mounted below the fuselage of WZ-6 is absent on JWP02. The exact function of JWP02 remains unclear because Chinese governmental establishments have not released any detailed information on this UAV other than photos of its deployment by the Chinese military. Presumably, it is used in reconnaissance missions.

== BZK-006 ==
BZK-006 is a further development of the WZ-6 adopted by the Chinese military, and it is an enlarged WZ-6 with four underwing hardpoints added, two for with wing. BZK-006 is capable of carrying a total of four Chinese UAV-employed missiles, and a photo of an air-to-surface missile targeting screen has been publicized by Chinese governmental sources when depicting BZK-006 deployed by the Chinese military. This drone was primarily used by the PLA Ground Force, launched by ground vehicles using rocket-assisted catapult. The BZK-009 entered service in around 2009.

== BZK-006A/KVD001 ==
KVD001, or BZK-006A, was an improved variant of the BZK-006 drone deployed by the PLA Ground Force.

== DCK-006 ==
DCK-006 is the unarmed reconnaissance version of BZK-006, and it shares the same dimensions as BZK-006. The endurance of DCK-006 is also 12 hours. Due to the addition of a mushroom-shaped communication antenna radome, the endurance of WZ-6 is significantly reduced due to additional weight. BZK-006 solves this problem by enlarging the airframe of WZ-6, which shares the same smaller airframe with ASN-207, and the enlarged airframe enables more fuel to be stored to extend the range and endurance. DCK-006 share the identical enlarged airframe of BZK-006 and thus have similar performance, which is needed for long endurance reconnaissance missions. DCK-006 made its public debut in the parade in Beijing for the 60th anniversary of the People's Republic of China.

== See also ==
List of unmanned aerial vehicles of the People's Republic of China
