= Hongdu GJ-11 =

Chinese unmammed combat aerial vehicle

GJ-11 / GJ-21
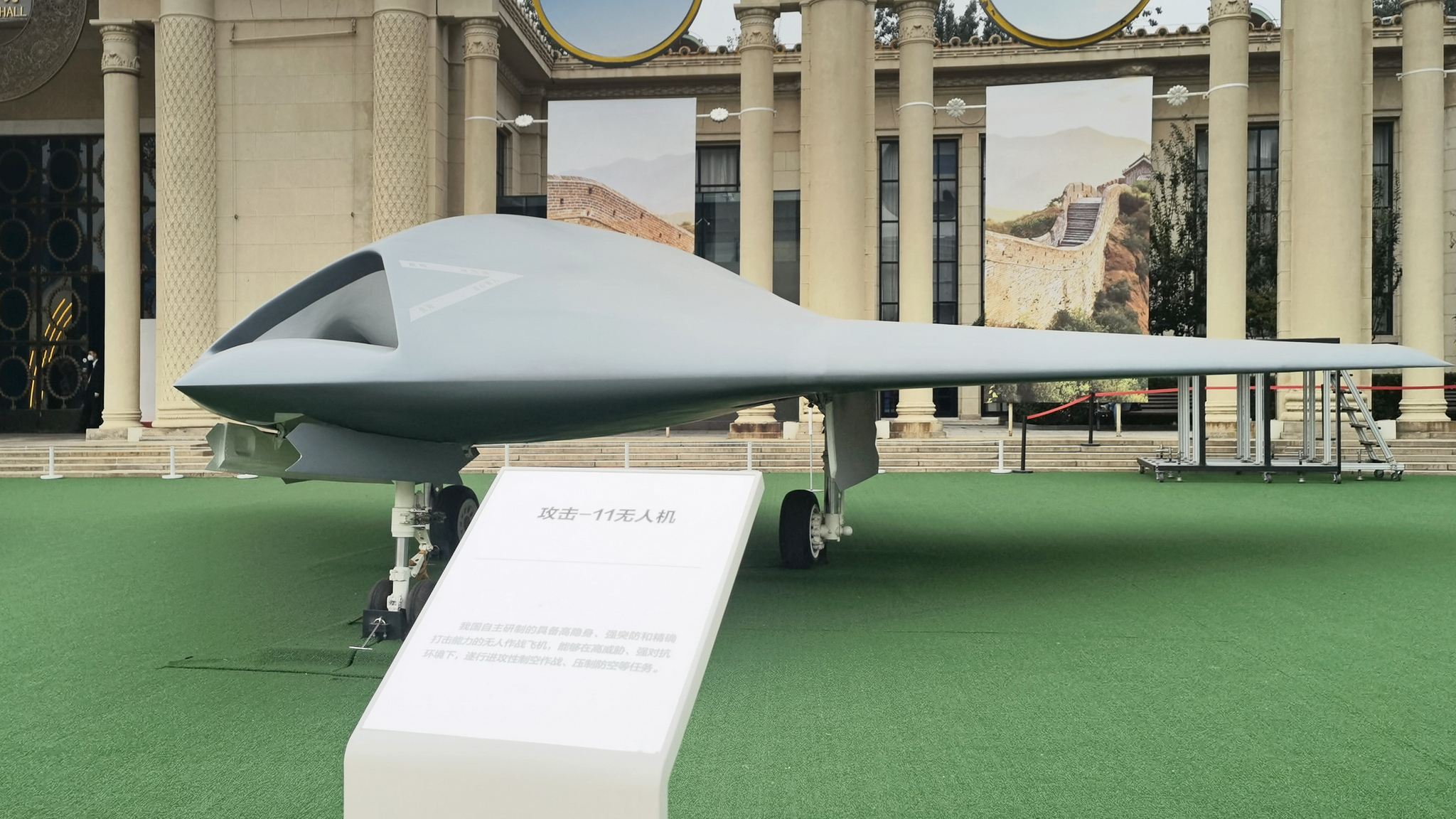
- Mock-up of GJ-11 displayed at Airshow China in 2021

General information
- Type: Unmanned combat aerial vehicle; Loyal wingman drone (intended)
- National origin: People's Republic of China
- Manufacturer: Hongdu Aviation Industry Group
- Designer: Shenyang Aircraft Design Institute; Hongdu Aviation Industry Group; Aviation Industry Corporation of China
- Status: In service
- Primary user: People's Liberation Army Air Force (PLAAF)

History
- Manufactured: 2013–present
- Introduction date: c. November 2025
- First flight: November 2013

The Hongdu GJ-11 (Chinese: 攻击-11; pinyin: gongji-11) is a Chinese flying wing type, tailless, jet-powered, stealth unmanned combat aerial vehicle (UCAV). The aircraft developed in the People's Republic of China between 2009 and 2025 for the People's Liberation Army. It was designed by Shenyang Aircraft Design Institute (SYADI) and Hongdu Aviation Industry Group (HAIG), and is part of seven proposed models by the Aviation Industry Corporation of China (AVIC) program called "AVIC 601-S". Its carrier-capable naval version is known as the Hongdu GJ-21 (Chinese: 攻击-21). The GJ-11 can perform precision strike and aerial reconnaissance missions.

During development, the GJ-11 was codenamed the Sharp Sword (Chinese: 利剑; pinyin: lì jiàn). This name was superseded by Xuanlong (Chinese: 玄龙; pinyin: Xuán lóng; lit. 'Mysterious Dragon') when the aircraft entered People's Liberation Army Air Force (PLAAF) service. The naval variant is developed for CATOBAR (catapult-assisted take-off but arrested recovery) operations on aircraft carriers and drone-carrying amphibious assault ships.

== Development ==
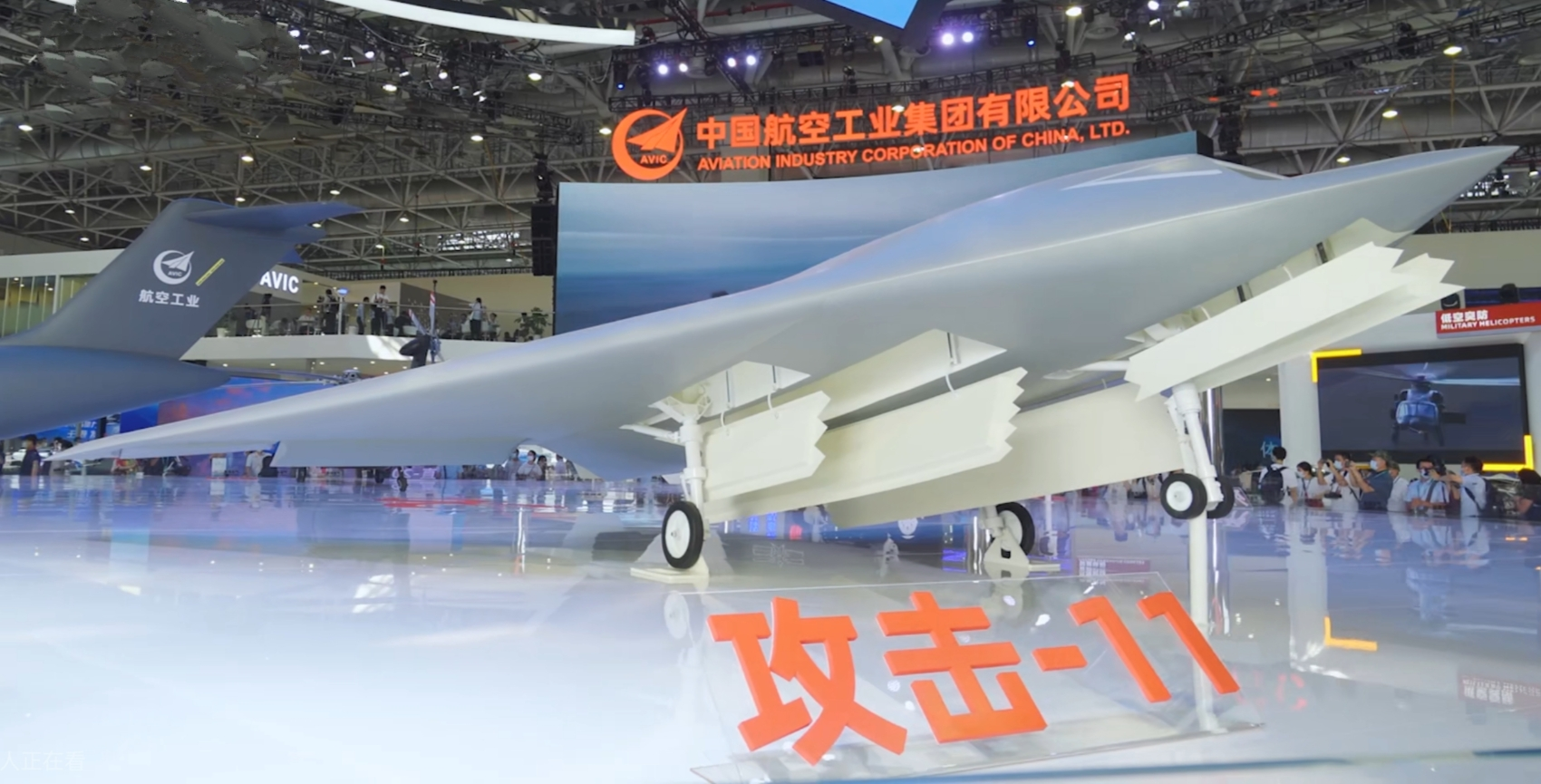
GJ-11 at Airshow China Zhuhai 2021

The Sharp Sword UCAV program was unveiled in 2009 and the first aircraft began ground testing on December 13, 2012.

Early versions were less stealthy with an exposed engine nozzle.

Images of the aircraft's 20 minute long maiden flight appeared on the internet on 21 November 2013, where the Sharp Sword took off from HAIG airfield. This made China the fourth country to successfully conduct a maiden flight of a UCAV, after the United States, France and the UK.

On 1 October 2019, China officially announced the new version of Sharp Sword, designated GJ-11, at the Chinese national day parade. The GJ-11 has a redesigned stealth exhaust.

In October 2021, AVIC showcased the GJ-11 at Airshow China. The drone is reportedly capable of taking off autonomously from Type 076 amphibious assault ships. The stealthy drone is able to deploy swarming air-launched decoys or electronic warfare systems, in addition to launching precision-guided munitions.

In October 2022, Chinese media showcased the computer-generated concept of three GJ-11 being controlled by a two-seat variant of the Chengdu J-20 fighter jet, akin to the Loyal Wingman program of the United States.

The drone was in testing and evaluation as of 2021, with serial production planned for 2022.

In 2024, multiple GJ-11 drones were observed at the People's Liberation Army Air Force (PLAAF) Malan Air Base, a major hub for testing unmanned platforms. The PLA also tested the integration of GJ-11 with manned aircraft as manned-unmanned teams. A naval variant was under development for Type 076 big-deck amphibious assault ships.

Operational testing continued in late 2025 at Shigatse Peace Airport. A mockup was displayed at the 2025 China Victory Day Parade.

In November 2025, the naval GJ-21 (GJ-11J) prototype conducted test flights in China, which was the first time it was captured by camera. The footage showed a clear navalized design, including a tail hook for arrested landing on the aircraft carrier.

In January 2026, the naval GJ-21 (GJ-11J) mock-up was spotted on the Type 076, indicating further development progress of the naval variant. In May 2026, a GJ-21 prototype with arrestor hook and catapult launch bar on its nose wheel was spotted undergoing flight testing.

On 30 October 2026, the People's Liberation Army announced that the GJ-21, now with the designation officially confirmed, successfully conducted its first CATOBAR (catapult-assisted take-off but arrested recovery) operations in October on the Chinese navy amphibious assault ship Sichuan, the lead ship of the Type 076 landing helicopter dock. Satellite images showed additional markings on Sichuan's deck before the maiden flight and that the ship left port between 13 October and 26 October. Analyst also noted that GJ-21 could be launched by the Chinese aircraft carrier Fujian in the future, as both classes feature similar electromagnetic catapult launch systems and arresting gears.

== Design ==
The GJ-11 uses a tailless flying wing design with blended wings, a dorsal intake, a twin-wheel nose landing gear, and two internal weapons bays. The sensor package includes a small radome, datalink, and a nose-mounted electro-optical targeting system (EOTS). Stealth features include radar-absorbing material (RAM) coatings, the shaping of the rear airframe around the engine exhaust, and serrated weapon bay doors. The aircraft is powered by a single turbofan engine and controlled by split flaps and inboard flaps on the wings. The overall wingspan is 14 meters.

The GJ-11 is designed for manned-unmanned teaming (MUM-T) with other aircraft, such as the Shenyang J-16 or Chengdu J-20, serving as the "loyal wingman" in flight formation. The weapons bays allows for various air-to-surface munitions for percision strike and suppression of enemy air defense (SEAD) missions. Within the unmanned combat aerial vehicle (UCAV) category, analysts believe the GJ-11's design leans toward high-capability aircraft types, instead of the affordability-focused Collaborative Combat Aircraft (CCA) concept.

The naval GJ-21, also known as the GJ-11J, features folded wings, an arrestor hook for landing, and a double nose gear with a catapult launch bar, intended for CATOBAR operation with electromagnetic catapult on Chinese aircraft carriers.

== Operational history ==
In November 2025, the People's Liberation Army Air Force (PLAAF) announced the service name for the GJ-11 is Xuanlong, roughly translated to Mysterious Dragon or Fantasy Dragon (Chinese: 玄龙; pinyin: Xuán lóng). China also showed footage of the GJ-11 operating closely with other PLAAF aircraft in formation, indicating the aircraft was close to entering service or had already attained that status.

With GJ-11 and GJ-21 entering service, the PLA Air Force and Navy would become the world's first to deploy stealth reconnaissance and attack unmanned combat aerial vehicle (UCAV), in spite of the United States having been testing experimental designs since the early 2000s, and the stealth attack UAVs having been phased out of the U.S. military force design.

In November 2026, the PLAAF released footage of the drone conducting live-fire training since it entered service.

== Variants ==
GJ-11
Original variant
GJ-21
Also designated GJ-11J, naval carrier-based variant.

== Operators ==
China

- People's Liberation Army Air Force: GJ-11
- People's Liberation Army Navy: GJ-21

== Specifications (Sharp Sword prototype) ==
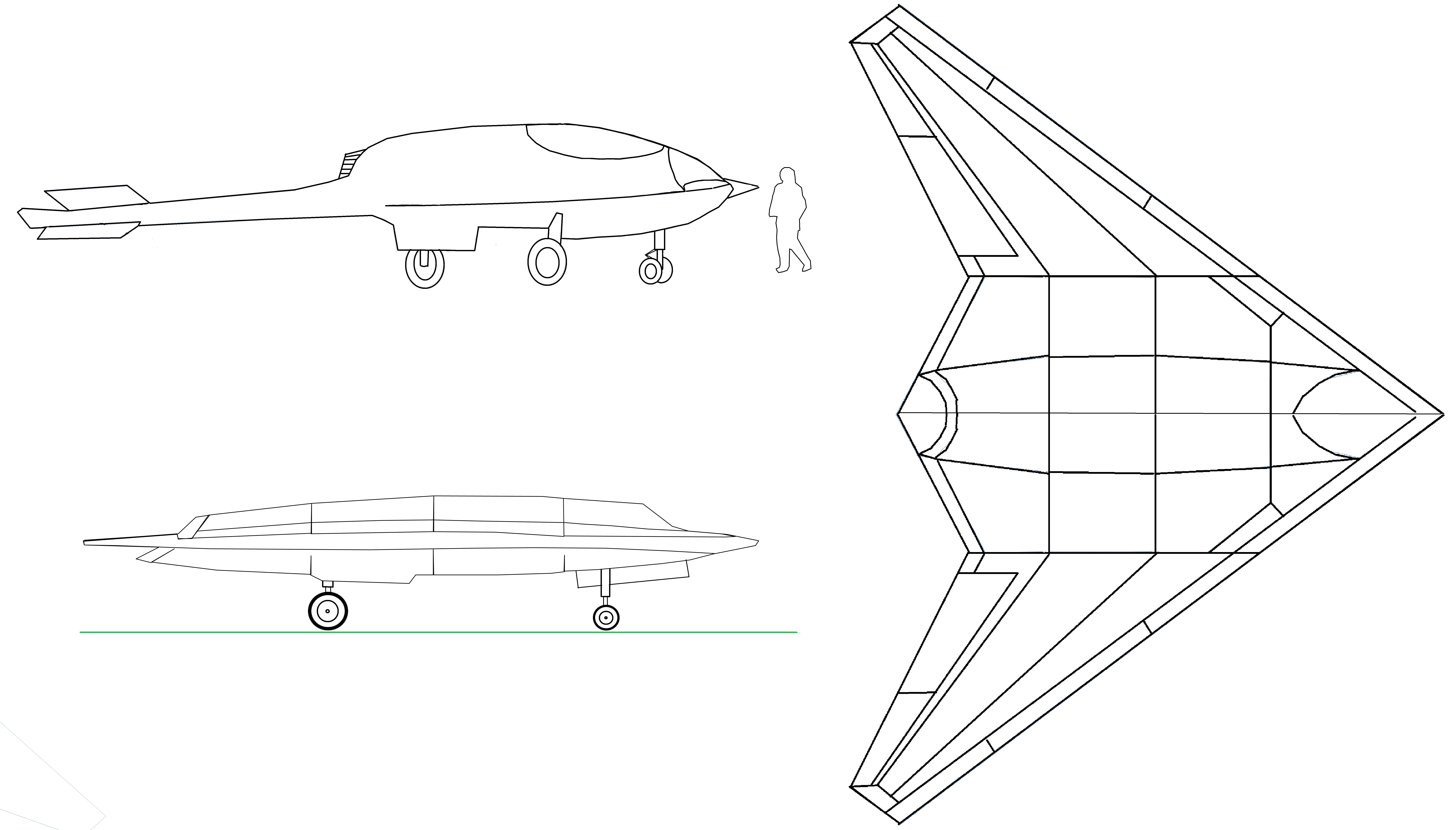
Chinese UCAV Sharp Sword (approximate appearance)

General characteristics

- Crew: None
- Length: 12.2 m (40 ft 0 in)
- Wingspan: 14.4 m (47 ft 3 in)
- Height: 2.7 m (8 ft 10 in)
- Empty weight: 6,350 kg (13,999 lb)
- Max takeoff weight: 20,215 kg (44,566 lb)
- Powerplant: 1 × unnamed Guizhou-built turbofan

Performance Armament

- Internal weapons bays:
  - Up to 2,000 kilograms (4,400 lb) payload
  - Bombs
