= AKD-9 =

Chinese anti-tank missile

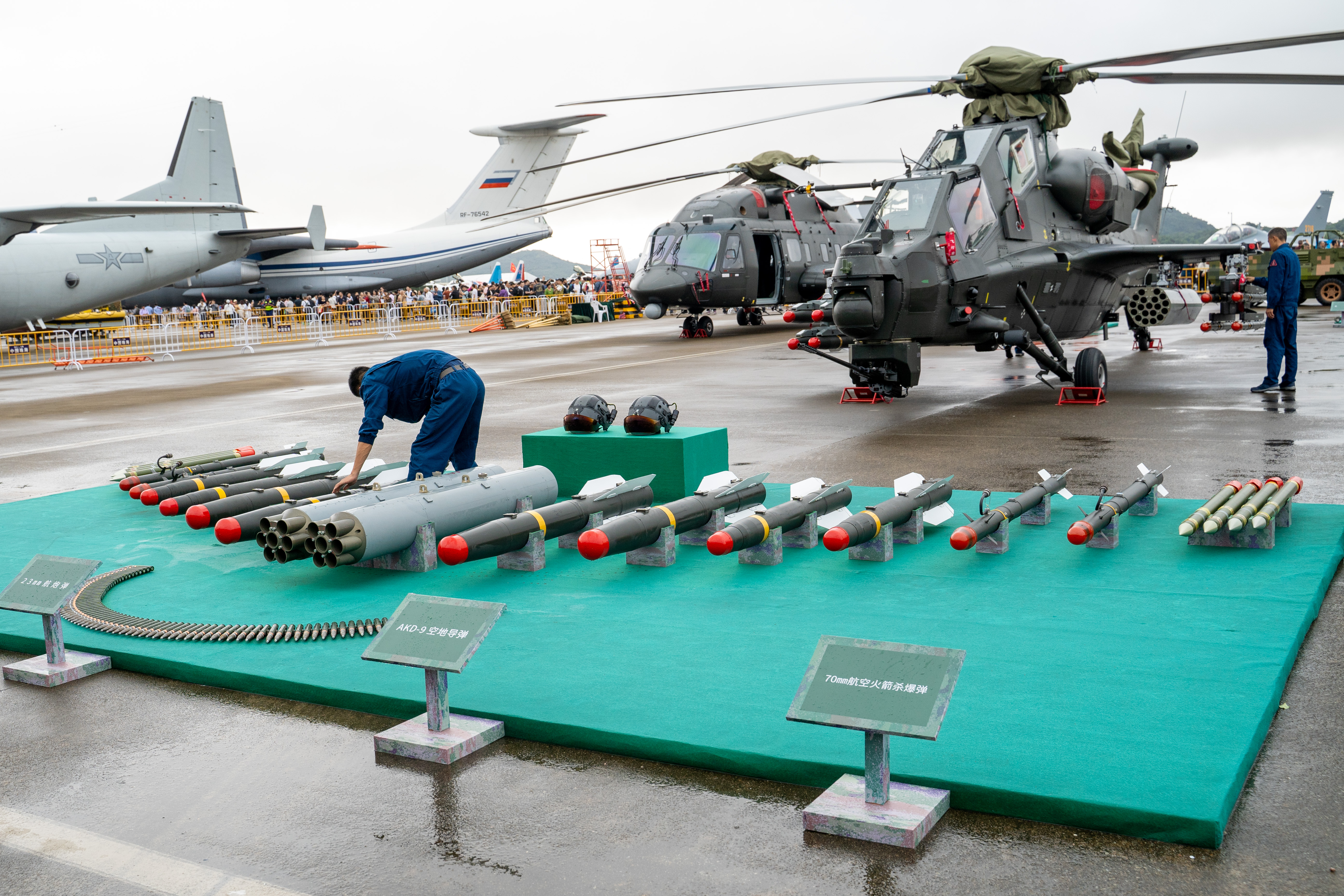
AKD-10 and AKD-9 missiles (center) displayed at Zhuhai Airshow 2024

The AKD-9 is a Chinese air-launched anti-tank missile. It's smaller than the AKD-10. The export designation is Blue Arrow 9 (BA-9).
