= Shenyang WZ-9 Divine Eagle =

Type of Chinese UAVs

UAV

General information
- Type: UAV
- National origin: China
- Manufacturer: Shenyang Aircraft Corporation
- Designer: Shenyang Aircraft Design Institute (601st Institute)
- Status: In service
- Primary user: China

The WZ-9 Divine Eagle (Chinese: 无侦-9 神雕; pinyin: WúZhēn-jiǔ) is a type of Chinese UAVs developed by Shenyang Aircraft Corporation (SAC), featuring a twin-boom configuration with a frontal horizontal stabilizer.

== Divine Eagle ==
Divine Eagle (Shen-Diao or Shendiao, 神雕) is a little-known jet-powered Chinese UAV under development reportedly since 2012. It was possibly in service as of 2018, with its existence first revealed in the Chinese military aircraft development genealogy map (中国军用飞机发展族谱图) as a high altitude long endurance (HALE) counter stealth UAV (高空远程反隐身无人机). It was confirmed by Chinese official sources when the autobiography of aircraft designer academician Li Ming (李明) was published in 2012, in which it was revealed that the Divine Eagle was designed by the 601st Institute (more commonly known as Shenyang Aircraft Design Institute) of SYAC, originally as a proof of concept aircraft for the development of counter stealth UAV. A graphic from a Chinese publication showed the employment concept for a large UAV similar to the Shenyang 'Divine Eagle' concept in a multi-platform warning system. Sukhoi's S-62 UAV concept and variations demonstrated in the 2013 Moscow Airshow are similar to the Divine Eagle，and Sukhoi officials noted that China had expressed "great interest" in the Zond designs. The first confirmed photo of Divine Eagle was revealed in mid 2015 when a photograph of it taxiing was published on the internet.

Divine Eagle is currently the largest UAV in China (as of 2015), with its length approaching that of Shenyang J-11. The photo of Divine Eagle taxiing suggests a fuselage height to length ratio of 1:12, giving probable length of 14.4 to 18 meters, and the wingspan is estimated at 40 to 50 meters. Divine Eagle adopts a unique layout in that it is in twin boom layout with twin tail and what appears to be a low wing configuration. The fuselages have bulbous noses that house satellite communication antennas, and the canard wing is mounted between them, but not at the leading edge. A much longer high-aspect ratio wing is mounted aft and an apparent high-bypass turbofan is mounted between two large vertical stabilisers. Divine Eagle carries up to seven AESA radars. Its wind tunnel tests were up to an altitude of 25 km and a speed of Mach 0.8.

== Specifications (WZ-9) ==
Data from Interesting Engineering

General characteristics

- Crew: None
- Length: 15 m (49 ft 3 in)
- Wingspan: 45 m (147 ft 8 in)
- Powerplant: 1 × Unknown type of jet engine

Performance

- Endurance: 35 hours
- Service ceiling: 25,000 m (82,000 ft)

Avionics

- Large side-looking radars (SLARs)
- Synthetic aperture radar (SAR)
- Moving target indicator (MTI)

== See also ==
- List of unmanned aerial vehicles of China
