= CAIG Wing Loong II =

Chinese military UAV

Wing Loong II
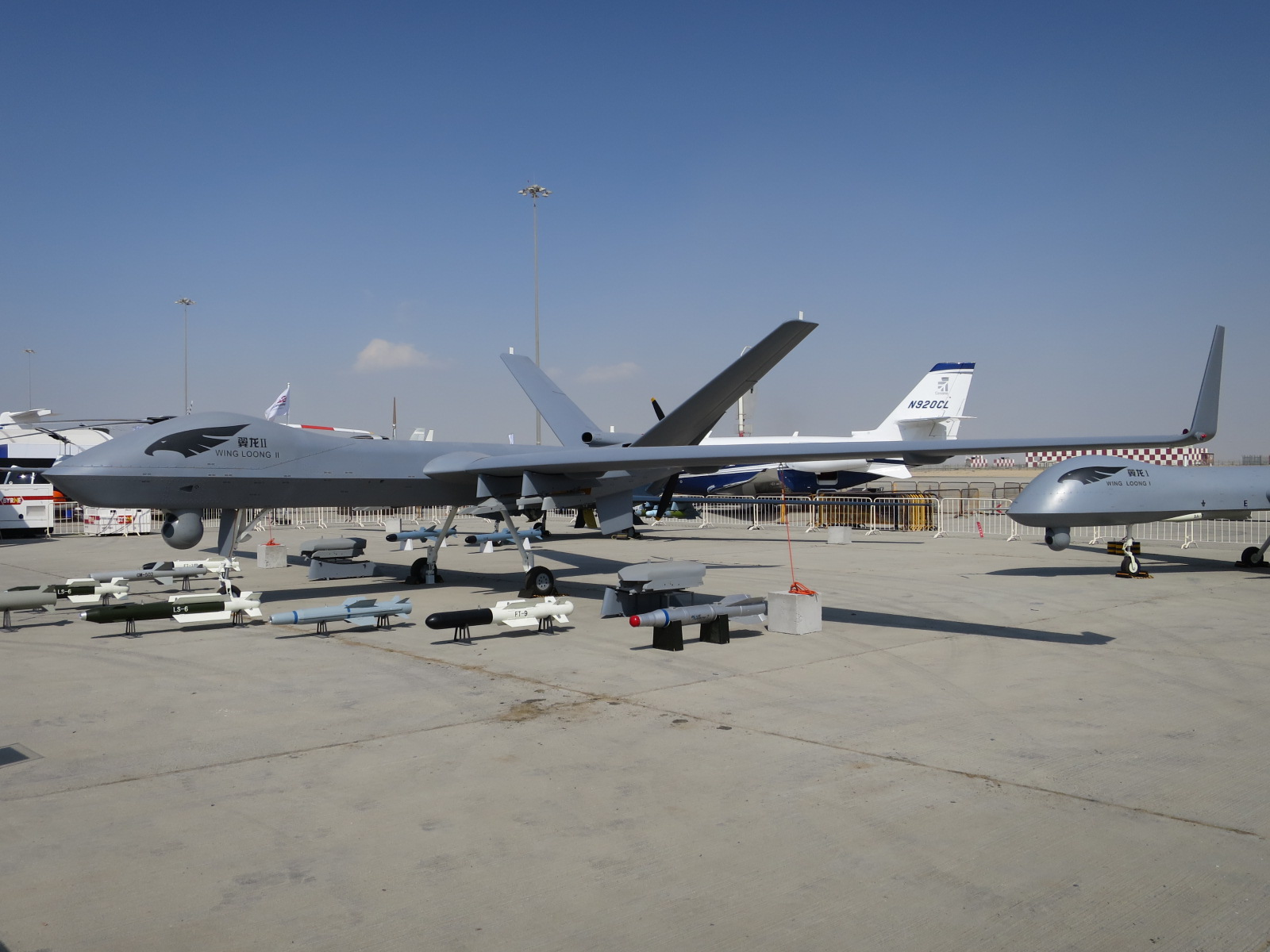
- Wing Loong II at Dubai Air Show 2017

General information
- Type: MALE UCAV
- Manufacturer: Chengdu Aircraft Industry Group
- Designer: Chengdu Aircraft Design Institute
- Status: In service
- Primary user: People's Liberation Army Air Force; Pakistan Air Force

History
- Manufactured: 2015-present
- Introduction date: 2017
- First flight: February 2017
- Developed from: CAIG Wing Loong
- Developed into: Chengdu Wing Loong-3

The Chengdu GJ-2 (Chinese: 攻擊-2), also known as Wing Loong 2 (Chinese: 翼龍2), is an unmanned aerial vehicle (UAV) capable of remotely controlled or autonomous flight developed by the Chengdu Aircraft Industry Group in the People's Republic of China. Intended for use as a surveillance and aerial reconnaissance and precision strike platform, Chengdu unveiled the concept of Wing Loong II at the Aviation Expo China in Beijing in September 2015. Wing Loong II has long range strike capability with a satellite link.

== Development ==
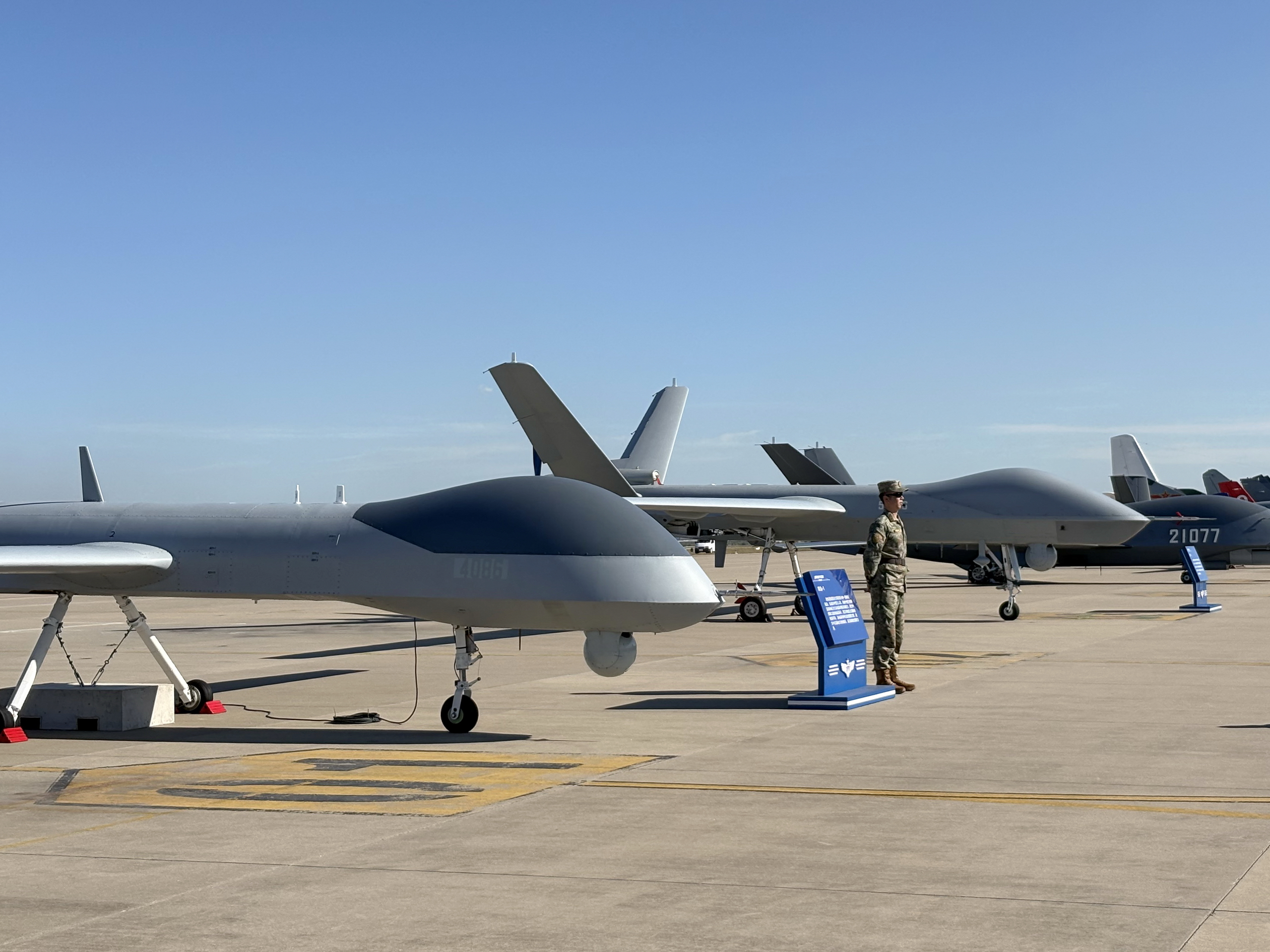
PLAAF Wing Loong-1 (GJ-1; front) and Wing Loong-2 (GJ-2; behind) on display, showing the difference in size and design

The prototype of the Wing Loong II was presented for the first time to the public during the Airshow China exhibition, held in Zhuhai from 1–6 November 2016.

== Design ==
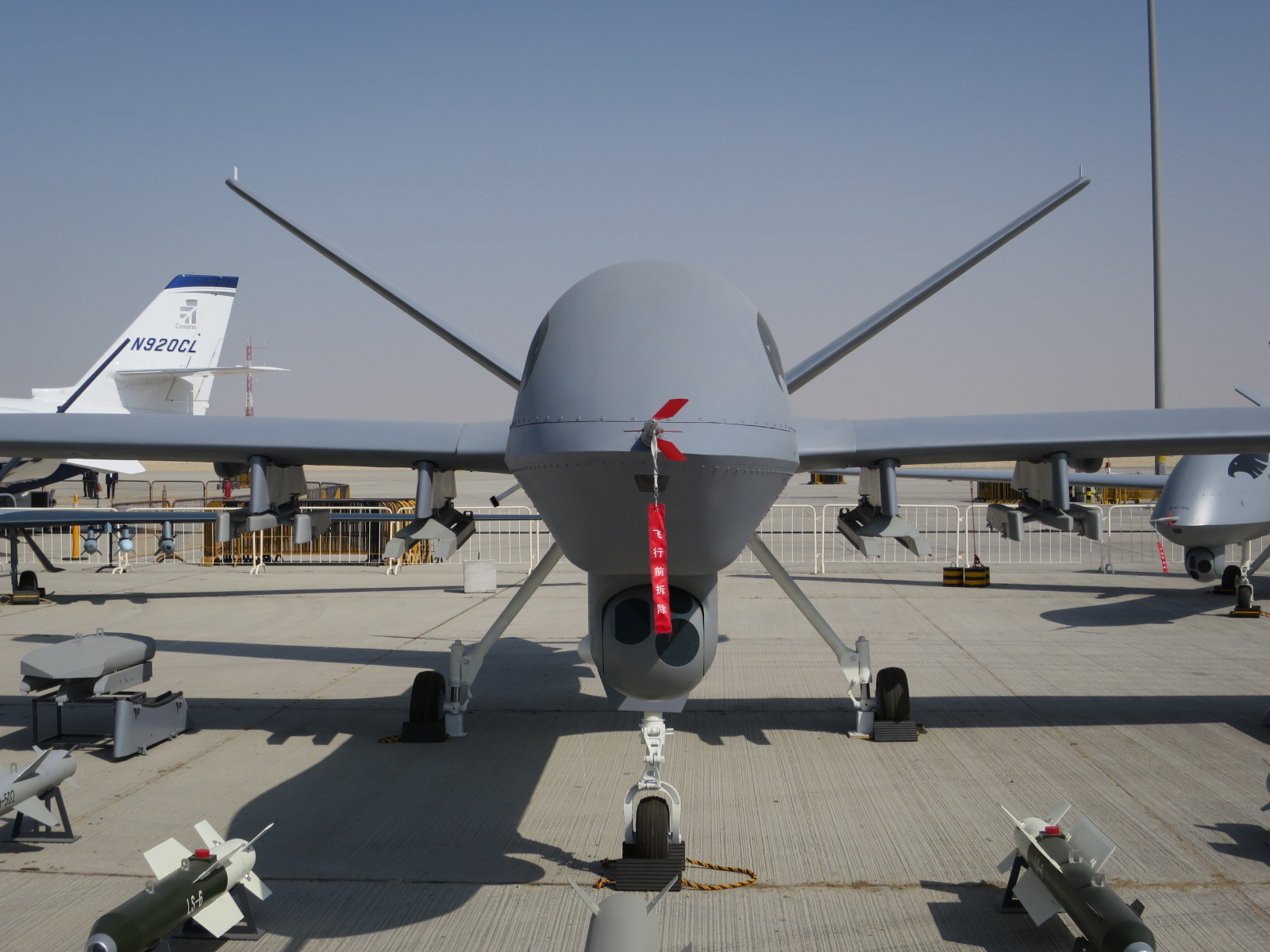
Wing Loong II front view, Dubai Air Show 2017

The Wing Loong II UAV MALE is an enlarged version of the Wing Loong I with a longer body and wider wing span. It has a slender fuselage, V-tail, and ventral fin. The aircraft features retractable landing gear, including two main wheels under the fuselage and one single wheel under the nose. Each wing has three hardpoints under the wings with the capability of carrying bombs, rockets, or air-to-surface missiles. A satellite communications antenna is situated on the top front surface of the fuselage, offering long range data transmission between the UAV and the ground station.

=== Comparison ===
Comparison of Chinese military UAVs
Variant	Armaments	Takeoff weight	Engine type	Maximum cruise speed	Operational endurance
CH-1	No	220 kg	Piston	140 km/h	6 hours
CH-2	No	220 kg	Piston	160 km/h	8 hours
CH-3	Yes, 80 kg	650 kg	Piston	220 km/h	12 hours
CH-4	Yes, 345 kg	1330 kg	Piston	180 km/h	30 hours for recon / 12 hours for strike
CH-5	Yes, 1000 kg	3300 kg	Turboprop	220 km/h	60 hours for recon / 30 hours with 8 AR-1 missiles
GJ-1 (Wing Loong I)	Yes, 200 kg	1100 kg	Piston	280 km/h	20 hours
GJ-2 (Wing Loong II)	Yes, 480 kg	4200 kg	Turboprop	370 km/h	32 hours / 20 hours at max speed
Wing Loong III	Yes, 2300 kg	6200 kg	Turboprop	-	40 hours
WZ-10 (Wing Loong-10)	Yes, 400 kg	3200 kg	Turbojet/Turbofan	620 km/h	32 hours

== Variants ==
GJ-2
Chinese military version of Wing Loong II. Distinguished by the lack of winglets. Officially entered service with the PLAAF in November 2018.
Wing Loong II
An upgraded variant of the Wing Loong-1, with provisions for up to twelve air-to-surface missiles.
Wing Loong 2H
Civilian, communication, emergency response variant, equipped with synthetic aperture radar and optoelectronic pod which is able to relay and amplify telecommunication signals. The Wing Loong 2H debuted in July 2021 when it was deployed to assist with rescue work in Central China's Henan Province after unprecedented heavy rainfall flooding, providing a stable communication signal that can be directly used by normal phones with areas of over 50 square kilometers.
Wing Loong 2D
Wing Loong 2Y
Wing Loong 3
Enlarged Wing Loong 2 with longer range and endurance hours. It is the first model in the Wing Loong series that is capable of deploying air-to-air missiles and reach intercontinental range. The drone was fitted with the PL-10E infrared missile, a sonobuoy launcher, and miniature UAV under its wings at the airshow display.

== Operational history ==
The Wing Loong II was used by the UAE to perform airstrikes against the Government of National Accord (GNA) in the Libyan civil war. The GNA received 12 Bayraktar TB2s in two batches between May and July. At least half of them have been destroyed during Libyan National Army (LNA) airstrikes using Wing Loong IIs; the second batch delivered in July was to replace the losses of the first. As of June 2020, a total of 6 Wing Loong IIs have been reported shot down or lost in Libya, all operated by the LNA. One was allegedly shot down by a laser: if this was true then it was the first time in history that a laser weapon shot down a combat vehicle.

An investigation led by BBC Africa Eye and BBC Arabic Documentaries revealed that the UAE used Wing Loong II drones to fire Chinese Blue Arrow 7 missiles at a military academy in Libya's capital, Tripoli, in January 2020, killing 26 unarmed cadets. The drone was operated from Libya's Al-Khadim air base which has been under the control of the UAE.

During the 2021 Henan floods, because of the interruption of communication in some areas due to flooding, the Ministry of Emergency Management dispatched its emergency disaster-response Chengdu Wing Loong II (Wing Loong 2H) to the corresponding areas, and carried out nearly 6 hours of ground reconnaissance and communication relay services.

In 2023 the Nigerian Air Force seems to have struck "Boko Haram" militants using the Wing Loong II. A video of one of the strikes seems to be available online.

In 2024, Pakistan carried out a strike on militants within the Iranian border in an operation named Operation Marg Bar Sarmachar during the 2024 Iran–Pakistan conflict in response to the 2024 Iranian missile strikes in Pakistan, using Wing Loong IIs alongside J-10C, JF-17s and F-16s.

In June 2024 Italy seized Wing Loong II disguised as wind turbine parts that appear to be in the process of being smuggled to the Libyan National Army.

Also in 2024, the UAE utilized the Wing Loong II to provide the Rapid Support Forces with aerial intelligence during the Sudanese Civil War.

A Reuters investigation published in February 2026 reported that a Wing Loong II has been flying over the South China Sea while broadcasting false transponder signals. Security analysts assessed that the false identification data could support reconnaissance or deception during "grey zone" operations.

During the 2026 Iran War, on the 2nd of April, a Wing Loong II belonging to either the Saudi Armed Forces or the Emirati Armed Forces (the only two known operators involved) was downed over Shiraz in Iran, and on the 3rd of April, another Saudi or Emirati Wing Loong II was shot down by Iran with its remains being fished out by fisherman in the Persian Gulf.

== Operators ==
- Algeria — 24 units on order for the Algerian Air Force; they should be fully operational by 2022.
- Bangladesh — Bangladesh Air Force has 24 Wing Loong II UCAVs on order from China (2025).
- China — In service with the People's Liberation Army Air Force since 2018, as GJ-2.
- Egypt
- Libya — In service with the Libyan Air Force that supported the Haftar's forces during the Second Libyan Civil War. Supplied by the UAE.
- Morocco — In service with the Royal Moroccan Air Force.
- Nigeria — Used in Boko Haram insurgency.
- Pakistan — In October 2018, it was announced that Pakistan Aeronautical Complex and Chengdu Aircraft Corporation would jointly produce 48 Wing Loong II UAVs for use by the Pakistan Air Force.
- Saudi Arabia — In service with the Royal Saudi Air Force. Used during the Yemeni Civil War against Houthi militias.
- Somalia - Used in operations against Al-Shabaab.
- United Arab Emirates — Launch customer for Wing Loong II in 2017.
- Côte d'Ivoire — The Ivorian Air Force has acquired 2 units in 2026.

== Specifications ==
Data from Army Recognition

General characteristics

- Crew: None
- Length: 11 m (36 ft 1 in)
- Wingspan: 20.5 m (67 ft 3 in)
- Height: 4.1 m (13 ft 5 in)
- Max takeoff weight: 4,200 kg (9,259 lb)

Performance

- Maximum speed: 370 km/h (230 mph, 200 kn)
- Cruise speed: 200 km/h (120 mph, 110 kn)
- Stall speed: 150 km/h (93 mph, 81 kn)
- Endurance: 32 hours
- Service ceiling: 9,900 m (32,500 ft)

Armament
Up to 480 kg

- Bombs
  - FT-10
  - FT-9
  - FT-7
  - GB7
  - GB4
- Missiles
  - BRM1
  - AKD-10
  - BA-7

Avionics

- Air-to-ground radars
- GPS communication system
- Electro-optical pod with day light and infrared cameras and sensors
- Satellite link
- Communications range: >1,000 km (620 mi) with SatCom, ~150 km (93 mi) from Ground Control Station (GCS)

== See also ==
- Chengdu GJ-1
- Chengdu WZ-10
- Chengdu Wing Loong-3
- CASC Rainbow

Aircraft of comparable role, configuration, and era

- BAE Mantis
- General Atomics MQ-9 Reaper
- Stella Tecnologia Atobá XR

Related lists

- List of Chinese aircraft
- List of unmanned aerial vehicles of the People's Republic of China
