= Chengdu Wing Loong-3 =

Unmanned aerial vehicle

Wing Loong-3
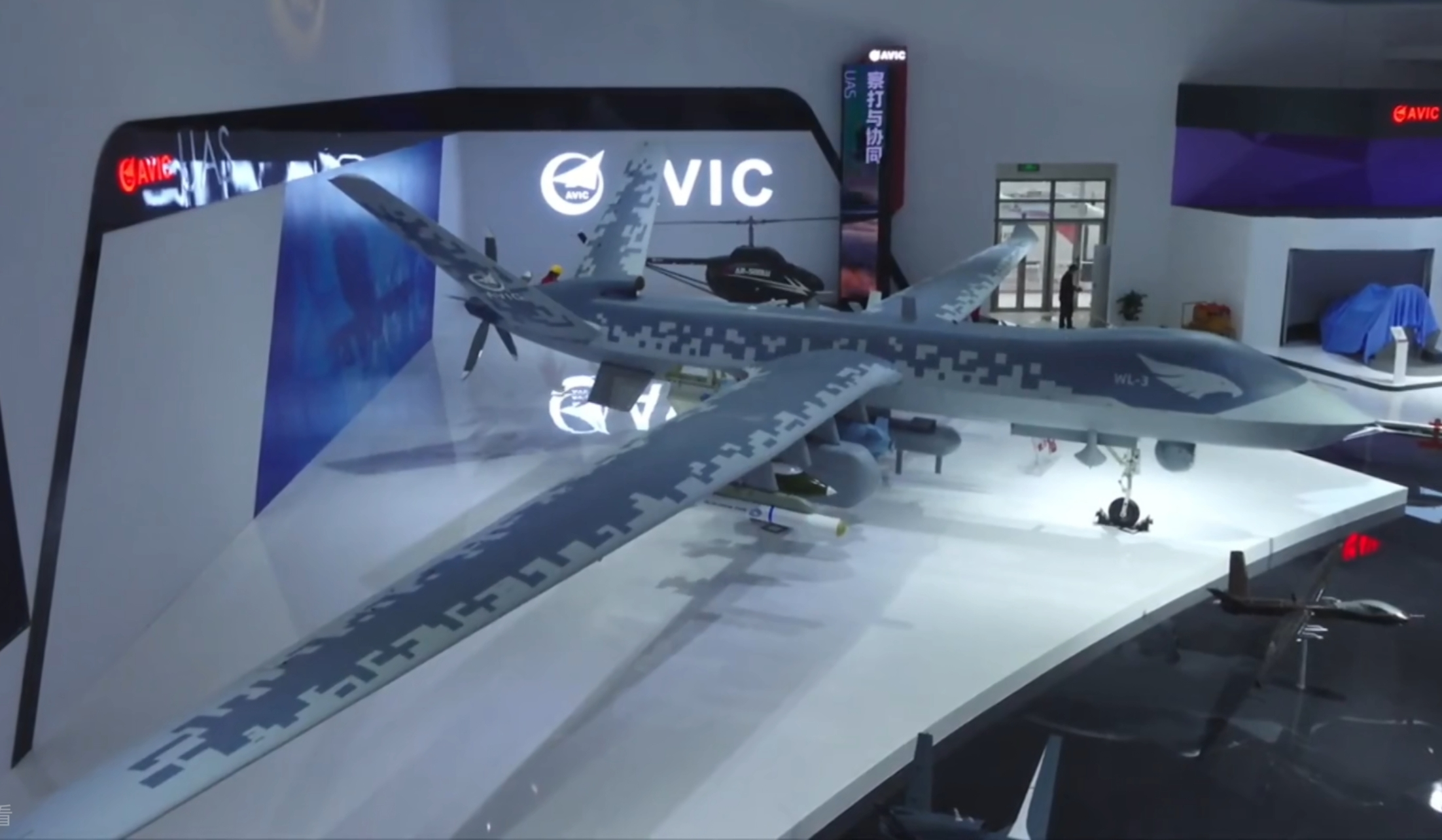
- Wing Loong 3 at Airshow China Zhuhai 2022

General information
- Type: MALE UCAV
- Manufacturer: Chengdu Aircraft Industry Group
- Designer: Chengdu Aircraft Design Institute
- Status: In service

History
- Introduction date: 2022
- Developed from: Chengdu GJ-2

The Chengdu Wing Loong-3 (Chinese: 翼龍3) is a Medium-Altitude Long-Endurance (MALE) unmanned aerial combat vehicle (UCAV), developed by the Chengdu Aircraft Industry Group in the People's Republic of China. Intended for use as a multi-purpose platform, including anti-air, anti-submarine warfare (ASW), ground strike, maritime strike, search and rescue, and surveillance and aerial reconnaissance capabilities which can fly a maximum range of 10,000 km at medium altitude with a maximum take-off weight of 6,200 kg. Wing Loong-3 is by far the largest and first air-to-air capable model of the Wing Loong family

== Design and development ==
The prototype of the Wing Loong-3 was unveiled for the first time to the public during the Airshow China exhibition, held in Zhuhai from 8–11 November 2022.

The design of the Wing Loong 3 is similar to the Wing Loong 2 consisting of a monoplane slender fuselage and empennage with a prominent V-tail and ventral fin. The landing gear consists of two main wheels under the fuselage and one single wheel under the nose. The electro-optical payload pod, fitted under the forward section of the fuselage, is integrated with daylight and infrared cameras and sensors to collect surveillance and targeting data in both day and low-light / night conditions.

== Specifications ==
Data from ,

General characteristics

- Crew: None (UAV)
- Length: 12.2 m
- Wingspan: 24 m
- Maximum take-off weight: 6,200 kg

Performance

- Range: ≥10,000 km
- Payload: 2,000 kg (external hardpoints) + 300 kg (internal bay)
- Endurance: ≥40 hours

Armament

- PL-10E air-to-air missile
- BA-7 anti-tank missile
- AG-300/M air-to-ground missiles
- Anti-submarine sonobuoy launcher

== See also ==
- Chengdu GJ-1
- Chengdu GJ-2
- Chengdu WZ-10

Related lists

- List of Chinese aircraft
- List of unmanned aerial vehicles of the People's Republic of China
