= Chengdu WZ-10 =

Unmanned aerial vehicle

Wing Loong-10 Cloud Shadow / Wind Shadow
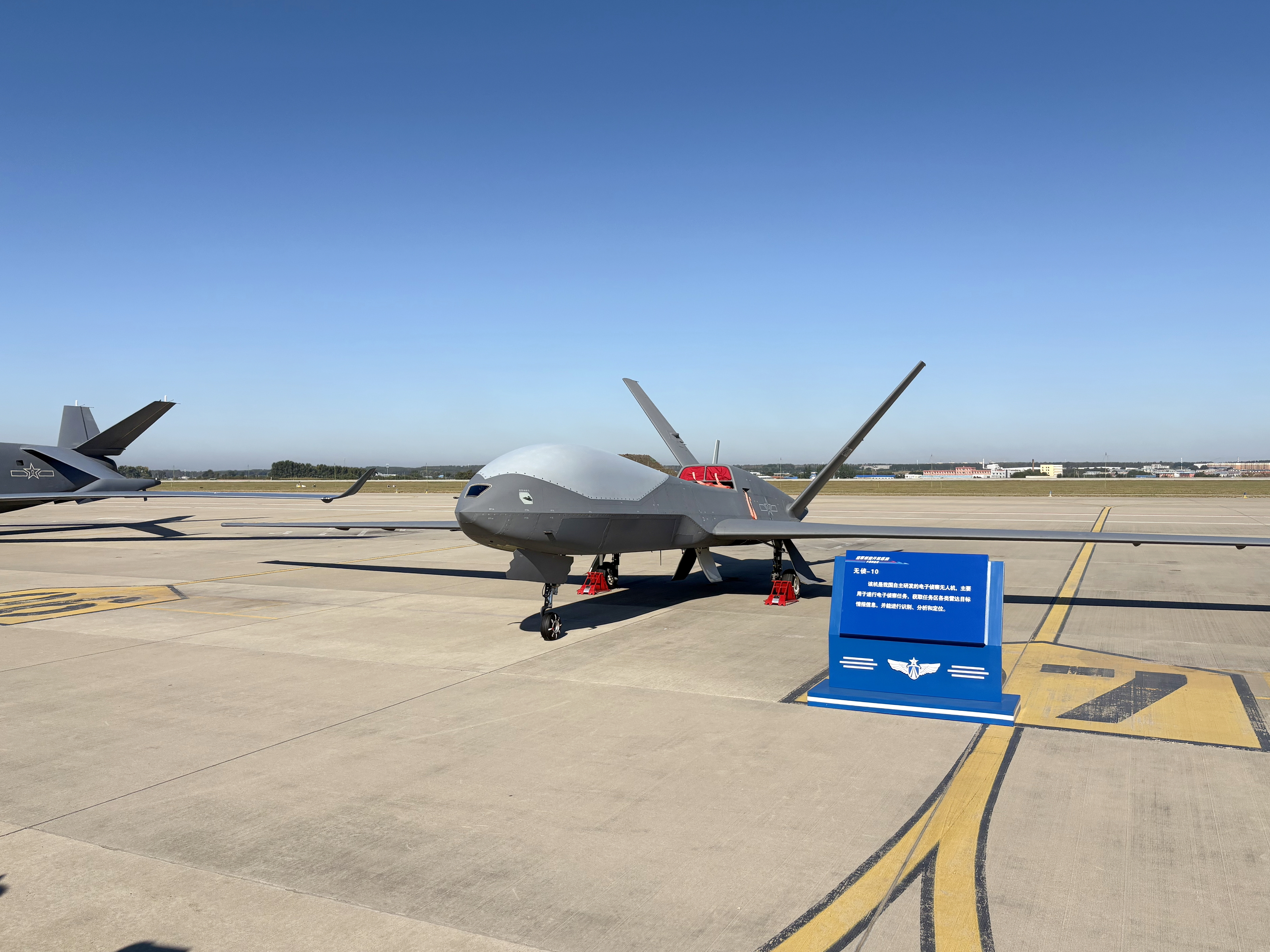
- PLAAF WZ—10 drone

General information
- Type: HALE unmanned aerial vehicle
- National origin: People's Republic of China
- Manufacturer: Chengdu Aircraft Industry Group
- Designer: Chengdu Aircraft Industry Group
- Status: In service
- Primary user: People's Liberation Army Air Force

History
- Introduction date: 2016
- First flight: 2014

The Wing Loong-10 (Chinese: 翼龙-10; pinyin: Yìlóng-10, Literal meaning: Winged Dragon, military designation WZ-10) is a series of unmanned aerial vehicles of the High-Altitude Long Endurance (HALE) type, featuring some stealth characteristics. As of 2017, it is being developed by the Chengdu Aircraft Industry Group for reconnaissance and precision strike missions.

Previously known as the Wind Shadow (Chinese: 风影; pinyin: Fēng yǐng) and Cloud Shadow (Chinese: 云影; pinyin: Yún yǐng) prototypes, the drone platform features various configurations and is designed for both the Chinese military and export customers.

== History ==
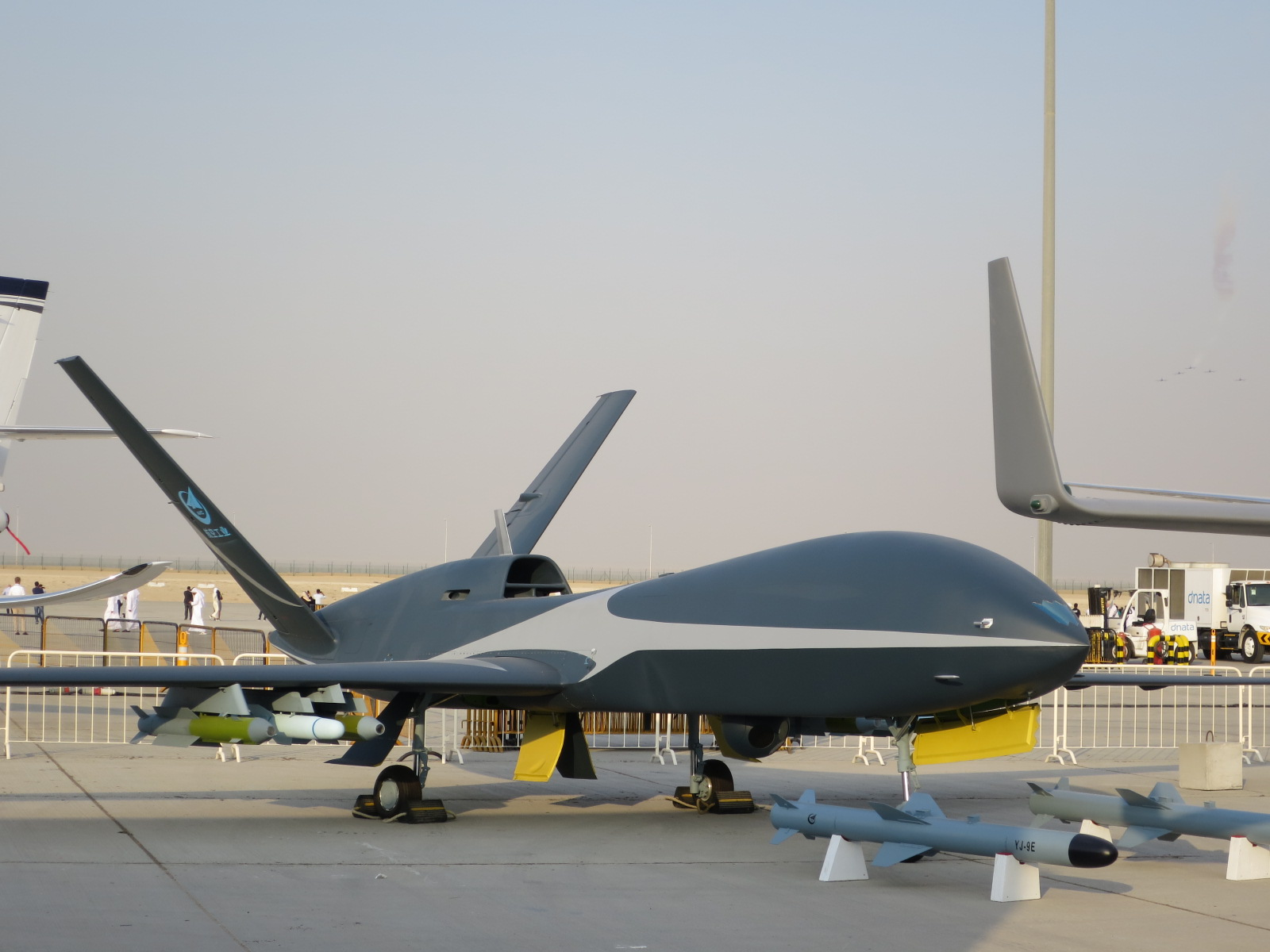
AVIC Cloud Shadow UAV on Dubai Air Show 2017

In 2007, Chengdu Aircraft Industry Group showcased Sky Wing III (Chinese: 天翼III; pinyin: Tiānyì-3) high-speed, high-altitude, tactical unmanned aerial vehicle at the 47th Paris International Aerospace Exhibition. The drone is externally similar to General Atomics Avenger, which was under development at the time. According to the manufacturer, The drone has a 15 km ceiling and 750 km/h speed, and the endurance is 6 hours. In 2014, the Sky Wing III was renamed to Wind Shadow with a twin-engine, longer endurance design featuring stealth characteristics.

The Wind Shadow, designed and constructed by Chengdu Aircraft Corporation for service with the People's Liberation Army Air Force, debuted at the 2014 Zhuhai Air Show.

An export-orientated version called Cloud Shadow was unveiled at the Zhuhai Air Show in 2016. The primary difference between Wind Shadow and Cloud Shadow is the engine. Wind Shadow features a twin-engine, stealth nozzle, and is turbofan powered. However, Cloud Shadow features a single turbojet engine without any stealth concealment for the nozzle.

In 2018, China Meteorological Administration launched the Haiyan Project, a meteorological observation experiment. Wind Shadow is used by the China Meteorological Administration to monitor typhoon movements. Military observers noted that Wind Shadow is also called Wing Loong-10, an unmanned aerial vehicle (UAV) product line manufactured by Chengdu Aircraft Industry Group, though Wing Loong series previously only had turboprop UAVs.

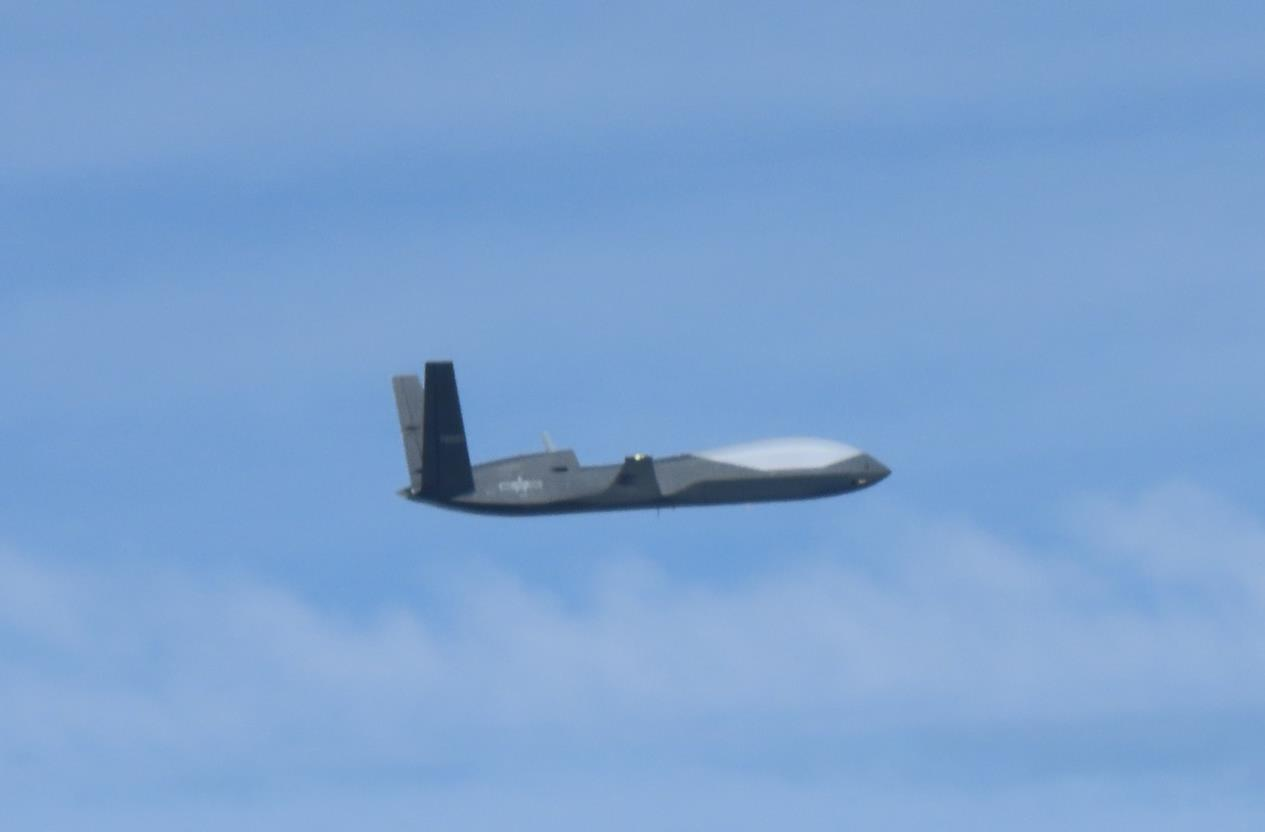
PLA Wing Loong-10 flying over the East China Sea

In May 2024, the aircraft was spotted flying over the East China Sea, close to Okinawa island.

== Design ==
=== Characteristics ===
According to GlobalSecurity.org, the Wind Shadow variant with two engines is designed for PLA domestic service, while the Cloud Shadow is export-oriented.

The UAV's wings, fuselage, and tail sections are built using composite materials. The bulbous nose tapers to the rear, with an air scoop set over the dorsal line. The scoop is straddled by outward-canted vertical fins. The shape is designed to reduce the radar cross section.

The UAV is offered in two variants, combat and ISR variant, which stands for intelligence, surveillance, and reconnaissance. The combat version comes with a range of weaponry to attack ground-based targets. The ISR variant is provided with payloads to assist armed forces in missions such as reconnaissance, battlefield assessment, observation, and monitoring.

Each Wind Shadow unmanned aircraft system includes three unmanned aerial vehicles, linked with one ground control station, and strike payloads. Cloud shadow UAV ground station by configuration can control three unmanned aerial vehicles to engage simultaneously, the usage of drones can be flexibly configured according to user needs. In the manual mode of operation, the operator sends mission commands to the aircraft via the data link. The drone is capable of flying autonomously.

=== Armaments ===
The UAV has six hardpoints, three on each wing, to mount weapons. With a take-off weight of 3,200 kg and a payload capacity of 400 kg, the drone can be equipped with a 50 kg CS/BBM3 (YL-12) GPS-guided bomb, Blue Arrow air-to-surface missile, 100 kg GB-4 precision-guided bomb, and light cruise missiles.

=== Engines ===
Cloud shadow is powered by a single WP-11C turbojet engine, or a single 1-ton class ZF850 engine, or optionally two AFE-50E turbofan engines.

Wind shadow features two WS-500 turbofan engines, and the engine nozzles are concealed inside the vehicle body with stealth features. In addition, a deceleration parachute is mounted in between the engine nozzles.

The aircraft has an endurance of 20 hours at a cruising speed of 330 knots.

== Variants ==
Sky Wing III (Chinese: 天翼III)
An early prototype of Wing Loong-10. High-speed, high-altitude, tactical unmanned aerial vehicle. Unveiled at the 47th Paris International Aerospace Exhibition in 2007.
Wind Shadow (Chinese: 风影)
A Chinese domestic military version prototype designation for Wing Loong-10. Featured stealth design, twin-engine, turbofan-powered, high-speed, high-altitude, long-endurance unmanned aerial vehicle. Unveiled in 2014.
Cloud Shadow (Chinese: 云影)
An export version prototype designation for Wing Loong-10. Stealth features, single-engine (optional twin-engine), turbojet powered, high-speed, high-altitude, medium endurance unmanned aerial vehicle. Unveiled in 2016.

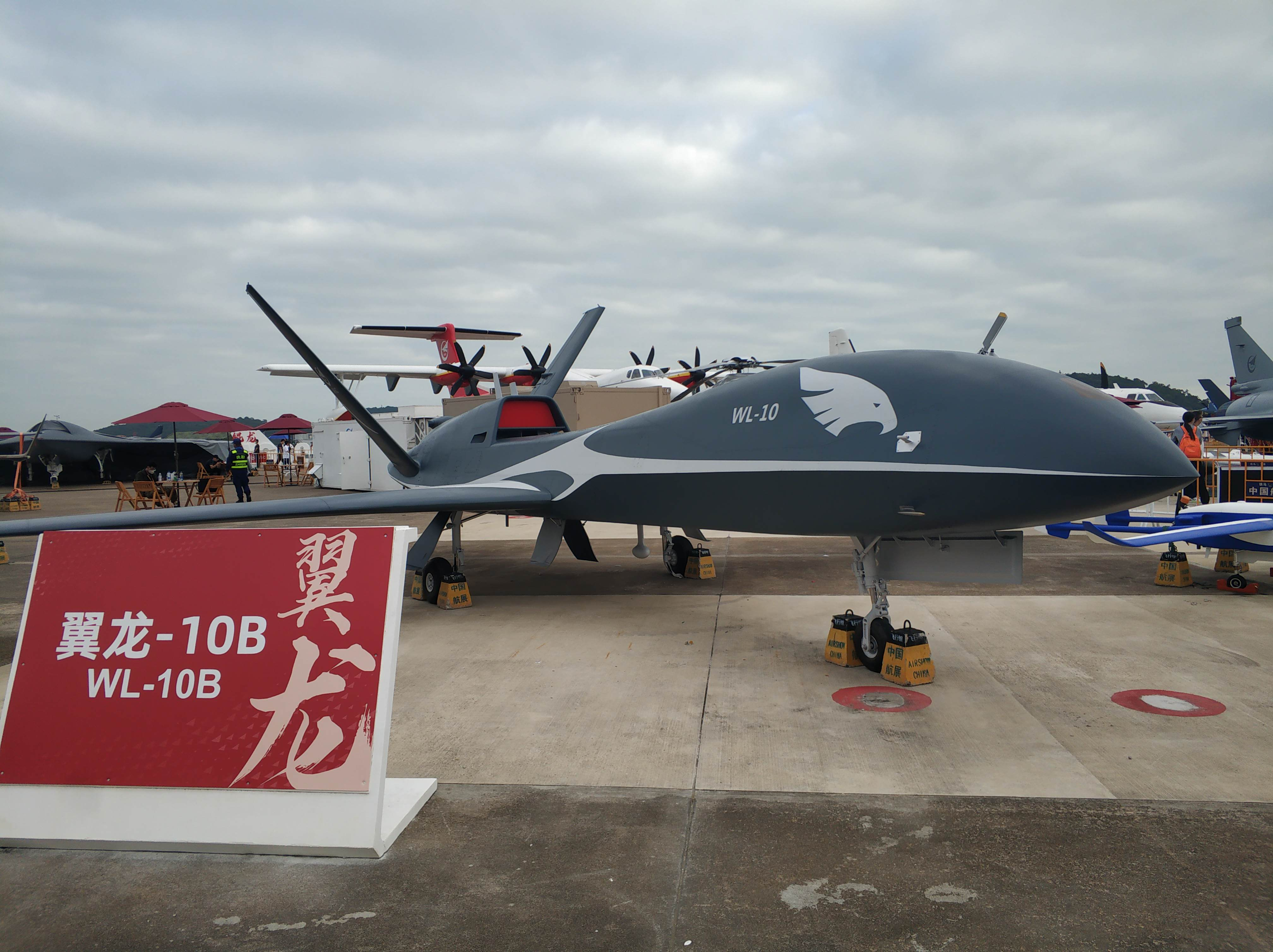
Wing Loong-10B at Airshow China Zhuhai 2022

Wing Loong-10
Mass-produced variant for export, debuted on August 2, 2020, for a typhoon detection test flight.
Wing Loong-10A
Export variant unveiled at Zhuhai Airshow 2022.
Wing Loong-10B
Export variant unveiled at Zhuhai Airshow 2022.
WZ-10 (Chinese: 无侦-10; pinyin: Wú zhēn-Shí; lit. 'unmanned recon-10')
Chinese military designation. Reconnaissance electronic warfare platform. Unveiled at Zhuhai Airshow 2022.

== Operators ==
China

- People's Liberation Army Air Force: WZ-10: 12 as of 2018
- China Meteorological Administration: Wing Loong-10

Saudi Arabia

- Royal Saudi Air Force: Wing Loong-10B: Believed to be in service as of 2024.

== Specifications (Cloud Shadow) ==
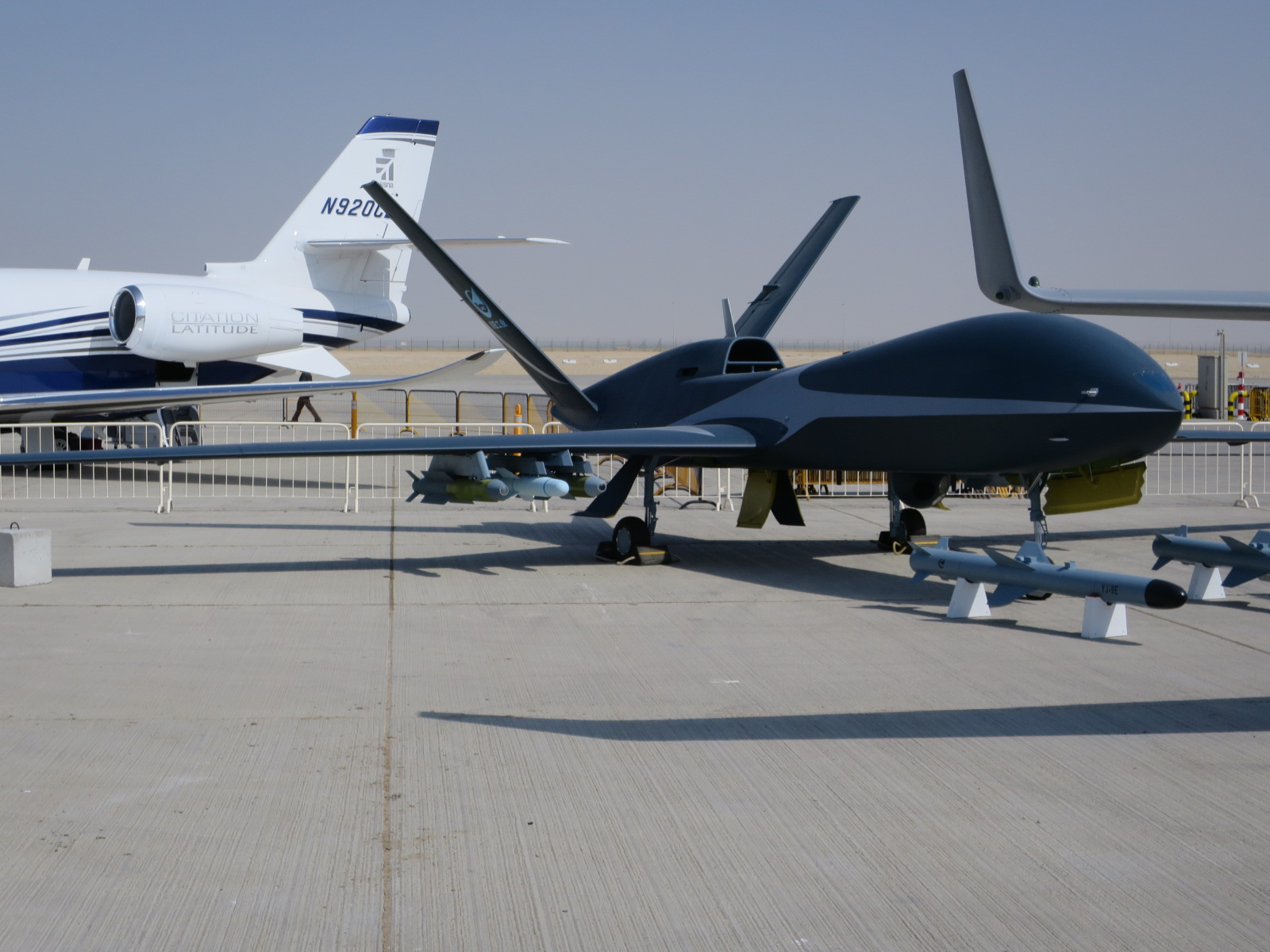
AVIC Cloud Shadow showing weapons

Data from Military Factory

General characteristics

- Crew: None
- Length: 9 m (29 ft 6 in)
- Wingspan: 20 m (65 ft 7 in)
- Height: 3.66 m (12 ft 0 in)
- Empty weight: 2,300 kg (5,071 lb)
- Max takeoff weight: 3,200 kg (7,055 lb)
- Powerplant: 1 × WP-11C or ZF850 turbojet, 9.8 kN (2,200 lbf) thrust
- Powerplant: 2 × AEF-50E turbofan, 4.90 kN (1,102 lbf) thrust each

Performance

- Cruise speed: 620 km/h (390 mph, 330 kn)
- Endurance: 20 hours
- Service ceiling: 15,000 m (49,000 ft)

Armament

- Missiles: Blue Arrow air-to-surface missile, light cruise missiles
- Bombs: CS/BBM3 (YL-12) guided bomb, GB-4 guided bomb

== See also ==
- Chengdu GJ-1
- Chengdu GJ-2
- Chengdu Wing Loong-3

Aircraft of comparable role, configuration, and era

- BAE Systems Mantis
- Guizhou Soar Dragon
- General Atomics Avenger
- TAI Anka-3
- Bayraktar Kızılelma

Related lists

- List of Chinese aircraft
- List of unmanned aerial vehicles of the People's Republic of China
