= CAIG Wing Loong =

Unmanned aerial vehicle

Wing Loong 1
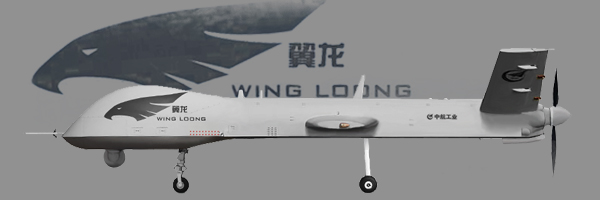
- Side view of Chinese multi-role UAV Wing Long

General information
- Type: MALE UCAV
- Manufacturer: Chengdu Aircraft Industry Group
- Designer: Chengdu Aircraft Design Institute
- Status: in service & in production
- Primary users: People's Liberation Army Air Force Egyptian Air Force; United Arab Emirates Air Force; Pakistan Air Force

History
- Manufactured: 2009
- Introduction date: 2011
- First flight: 2009
- Developed into: CAIG Wing Loong II

The Chengdu GJ-1 (Chinese: 攻擊-1), also known as Wing Loong 1 (Chinese: 翼龍1), is a medium-altitude long-endurance (MALE) unmanned aerial vehicle (UAV) developed by the Chengdu Aircraft Industry Group in the People's Republic of China. Intended for use as a surveillance and aerial reconnaissance platform, the Pterodactyl I is capable of being fitted with air-to-surface weapons for use in an unmanned combat aerial vehicle (UCAV) role.

== Design and development ==
Designed and developed by the Chengdu Aircraft Design Institute (CADI), a division of the Aviation Industry Corporation of China (AVIC), the Pterodactyl I bears a distinct similarity in appearance to the Predator/Reaper family of drones developed by the United States. The drone is capable of being fitted with a variety of sensors, including a forward looking infrared turret and synthetic aperture radar. In addition, the aircraft is capable of carrying weapons. The Pterodactyl I's total payload capacity for sensors and weapons is 200 kilograms (440 lb).

== Operational history ==
According to CADI, the Pterodactyl I undergone flight testing and has proven successful, with the flight test program including weapons tests of both bombs and air-to-surface missiles.

A model of the Pterodactyl I was displayed at the 2010 China International Aviation and Aerospace Exhibition at Zhuhai, the first public acknowledgment of the program; however, it was claimed by AVIC that the aircraft had been displayed at the 2008 airshow. The aircraft has been approved for export by Chinese authorities; the Pterodactyl I was evaluated by Pakistan, but was not selected for procurement.

One example of the type was known to have been lost in an accident during 2011.

An unknown number of Pterodactyl UAVs were purchased by Saudi Arabia in May 2014.

Since 2011, China has also sold the Wing Loong to several countries in Africa and the Middle East, including Nigeria, Egypt, and the United Arab Emirates, at an estimated $1 million per unit.

=== Egypt ===
In March 2017, the Egyptian Air Force launched a number of airstrikes in North Sinai's cities of El Arish, Rafah, and Sheikh Zuweid, as part of the operations conducted by the Egyptian Armed Forces against militants. Most of the strikes, which targeted stationing points and moving vehicles, were carried out by Wing Loong UCAVs leaving 18 militants killed.

=== Ethiopia ===
There is contradictory reporting whether Chinese-made Chengdu Pterodactyl I drones operated by United Arab Emirates have supported the advance of the Ethiopian army and its allies into Tigray.

=== Libya ===
- 2019, Libyan National Army (LNA) forces, loyal to General Khalifa Haftar used extensively Chinese-made Wing Loong I and II drones supplied by the United Arab Emirates in the Civil War conflict against the Government of National Accord (GNA), The GNA also deployed Turkish drones in its war after receiving 12 Bayraktar TB2s in two batches between May and July 2019, at least half of them have been destroyed during LNA airstrikes using Wing Loong IIs, the second batch delivered in July was to replace the losses of the first.
- August 3, 2019, Libyan GNA forces announced the shoot down of a Libyan National Army (LNA) Wing Loong drone over Misrata.
- 6 August 2019 A GNA Ilyushin Il-76TD cargo plane is destroyed in the ground on Misrata Airport by a LNA Wing Long drone.
- 17 October 2019, a LNA Wing Loong II combat drone is shot down in Misrata by a surface-air missile.
- 27 January 2020, a LNA Wing Loong II combat drone is shot down near Misrata.
- 13 May 2020, a LNA Wing Loong was shot down and recorded by GNA forces.
- 18 May 2020, a LNA Wing Loong was shot down between Zuwara and Aljmail, allegedly by fire from an Italian frigate.
- 24 May 2020, a LNA Wing Loong II combat drone is shot down by friendly fire from LNA Pantsir air defense system over Libya.
- 6 June 2020, a LNA Wing Loong was shot down near Sirte by GNA forces.
- 22 October 2020, the remains of a LNA Wing Loong was found in Ash-Shwayrif, Libya.
- 2 August 2021, another LNA Wing Loong wreck was recorded crashed on southwest Bani Walid, Misratah.

=== Yemen ===
- 26 December 2016 a Wing Loong UCAV operated by the United Arab Emirates was shot down by Houthi forces in Yemen.
- April 2018 they were used in Yemen by the Saudi led Operation Decisive Storm in successfully killing Saleh Ali al-Sammad, a senior Houthi leader by Wing Loong UCAV.
- 19 April 2019, Houthi rebels published a video of the downing and crash site of a United Arab Emirates CAIG Wing Loong acting for Saudi-led intervention over Saada district. It was probably shot down with a R-73 or R-27T missile.
- 1 December 2019, Houthi forces reported shooting down a Saudi Arabian Wing Loong drone over Yemen, showing the wreckage of the drone later. Another Wing Loong was reported shot down ten days later. Houthi media published pictures of the drone wreckage.
- 20 May 2021, Houthi fighters shot down another a Saudi Arabian Wing Loong I drone in Najran region. Displaying photos and a video of the crash site.
- 13 September 2021, Houthi media announced the downing of a Saudi Coalition Wing Loong drone in Kataf area, Saada region, displaying footage of the shootdown.
- January 2021, Houthi forces shot down two UAE Operated Wing Loong drones in Shabwa province.

=== Pakistan ===
In June 2016, a pterodactyl variant of the drone crashed in Pakistan while on an experimental flight near Headpaka area of Mianwali district of Pakistan's Punjab. Until this crash, Pakistan was not a known operator of the Wing Loong.

== Variants ==
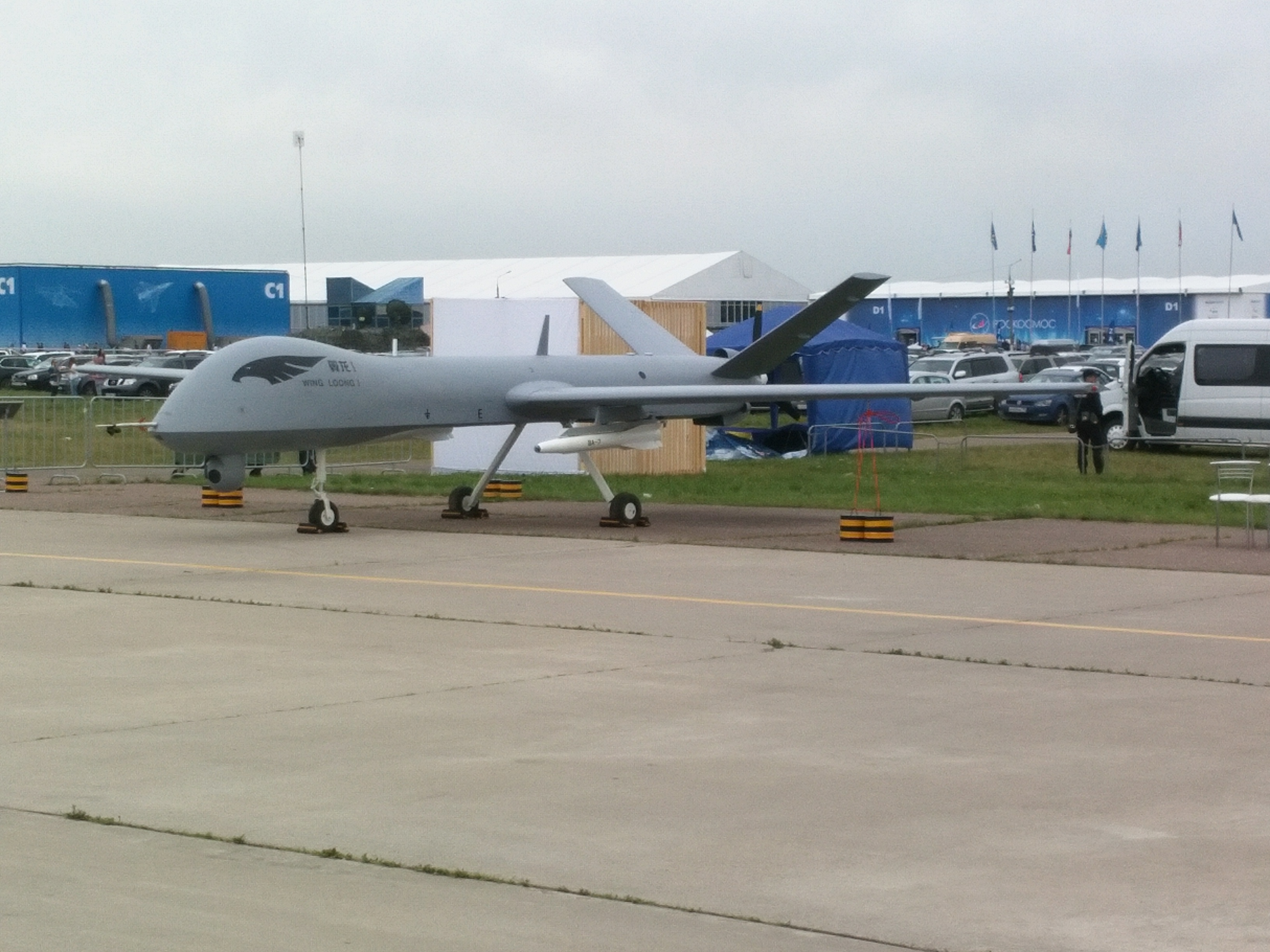
Wing Loong at MAKS 2017

=== Chinese military version ===
WJ-1
The armed version of Pterodactyl I, which is a weapon platform without the reconnaissance/targeting pod under the chin. The designation WJ stands for Wu-Zhuang Wu-Ren-Ji (武装无人机), meaning armed UAV. WJ-1 UAV made its public debut in November 2014 at the 10th Zhuhai Airshow along with its cousin GJ-1.

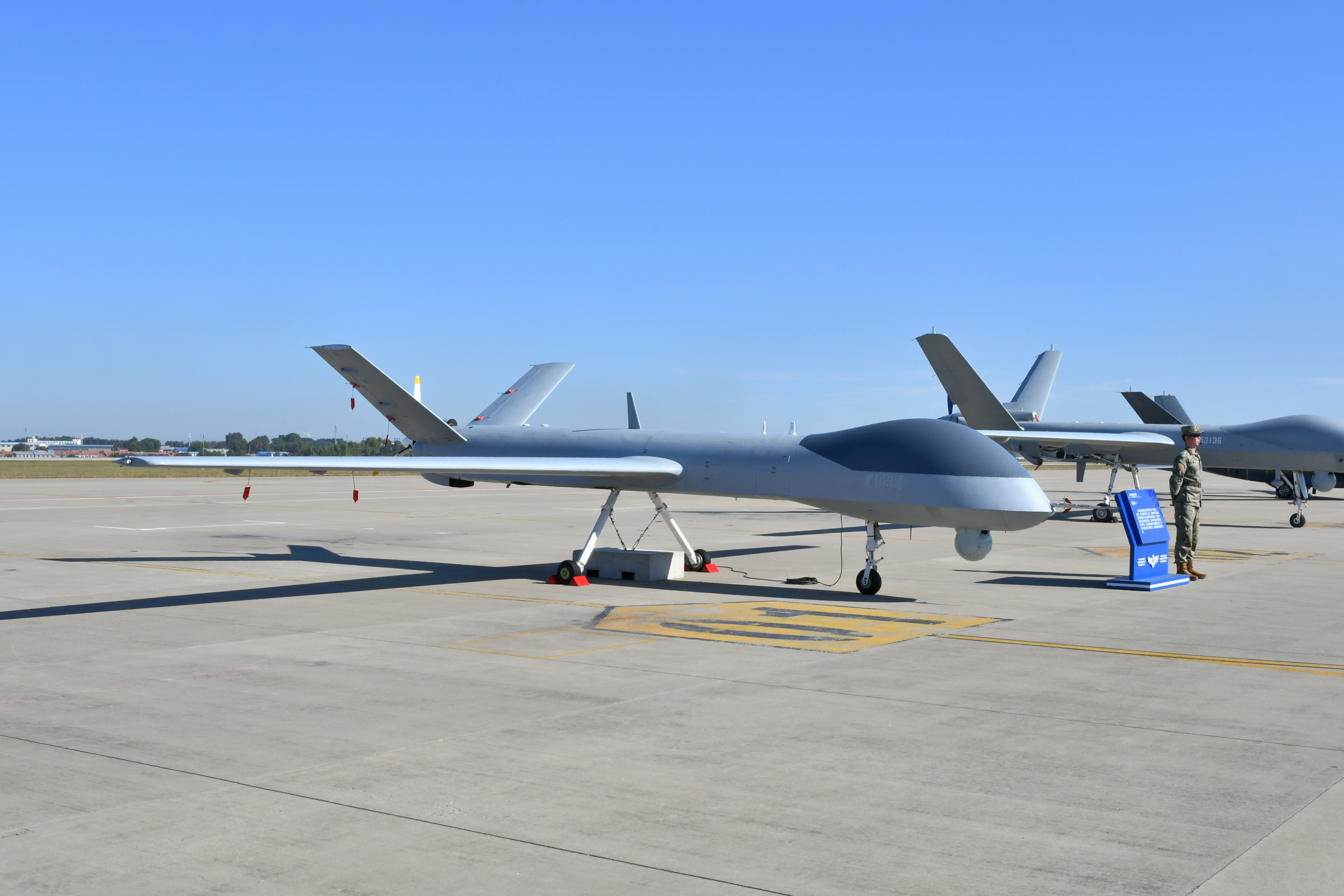
PLAAF GJ-1 drone in 2025

GJ-1
Another armed version of Pterodactyl I that combines the capabilities of both Pterodactyl I and WJ-1 so that it can identify and engage targets on its own. GJ-1 can be distinguished from both Pterodactyl I and WJ-1 in that GJ-1 has both the reconnaissance/targeting pod under the chin as well as hardpoints to carry weapons. The designation GJ stands for Gong-Ji Wu-Ren-Ji (攻击无人机), meaning "attack UAV." GJ-1 UAV made its public debut in November 2014 at the 10th Zhuhai Airshow along with its cousin WJ-1.

=== Export version ===
Pterosaur I
First member of Wing Loong series, with program of Wing Loong begun in May 2005. Maiden flight was completed in October 2007 and payload evaluation flight was completed a year later in October 2008. This first model of Wing Loong series lacked the bulge at the nose tip of the fuselage due to the lack of a satellite antenna, and while the English name used by the developer differed from later models, the Chinese name remains the same, and so is the name Wing Loong for the entire series. The lack of satellite antenna results in cheaper cost, with the reduction of the maximum control range around to 200 km. This model is no longer actively marketed when Pterodactyl I appeared, but is still available as a cheaper alternative up on potential customers’ request.

Pterodactyl I
The second member of the Wing Loong series is distinguished from the earlier Pterosaur I in that there is a bulge at the nose tip of the fuselage to house a satellite antenna, and this is the version most widely publicized and actively marketed as a surveillance platform. United Arab Emirates and Uzbekistan were reported to be the first two foreign customers of Pterodactyl I.
Sky Saker
Sky Saker is a derivative of Wing Loong developed by Norinco mainly intended for export. The Chinese name is Rui Ying (锐鹰), meaning Sharp Eagle, but the English name adopted by the developer is Sky Saker. Sky Saker / Rui Ying carries both a miniature synthetic aperture radar and an electro-optical pod to perform reconnaissance in both the visible light and radar spectra. The capability of Sky Saker / Rui Ying has been exaggerated by many Chinese internet sources claiming that it has both scout and strike capabilities at the same time, but this has been proven to the contrary. According to all info released by Norinco itself (as of 2015), the UAV can employ only a single capability at a time: when the UAV carries the reconnaissance payload, no weaponry is carried. Similarly, when weaponry is carried, the reconnaissance payload is absent.

Wing Loong ID
Upgraded variant of the Wing Loong I, with improved aerodynamics and engine enabling greater takeoff weight, service ceiling, and endurance. Other upgrades include both internal and external stores, as well as communications equipment. The variant launched in 2018 with Egypt being the first buyer of 32 systems. The variant achieved its first flight on 23 December 2018.

Wing Loong 1E
Maiden flight on 20 January 2022. The new drone features larger carrying capacity than previous models.

=== Further development ===
Wing Loong II
An upgraded variant of the Wing Loong, with provisions for up to twelve air-to-surface missiles. Officially entered service with the PLAAF in November 2018.

== Operators ==
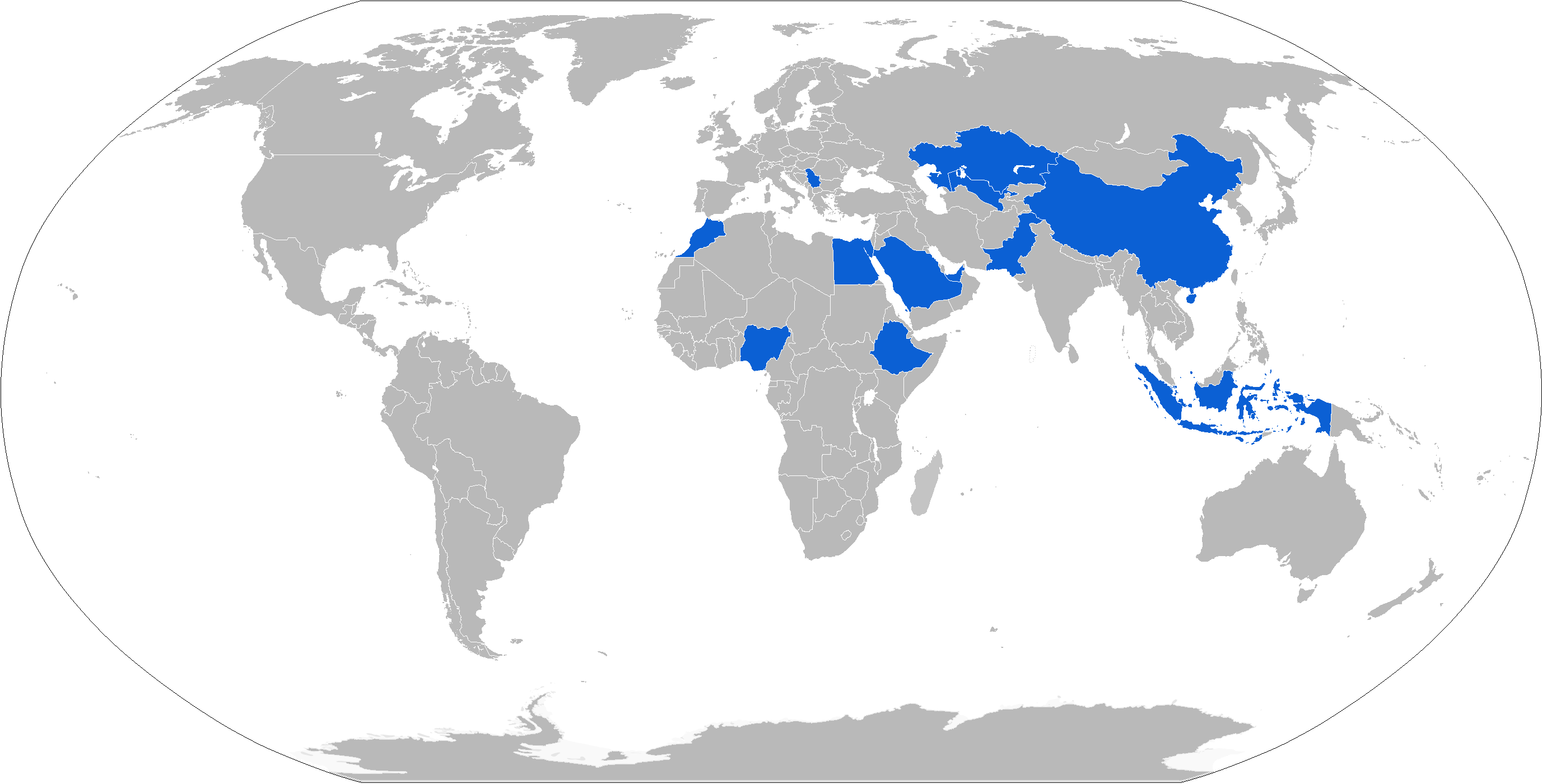
Map with Wing Loong UAV operators in blue

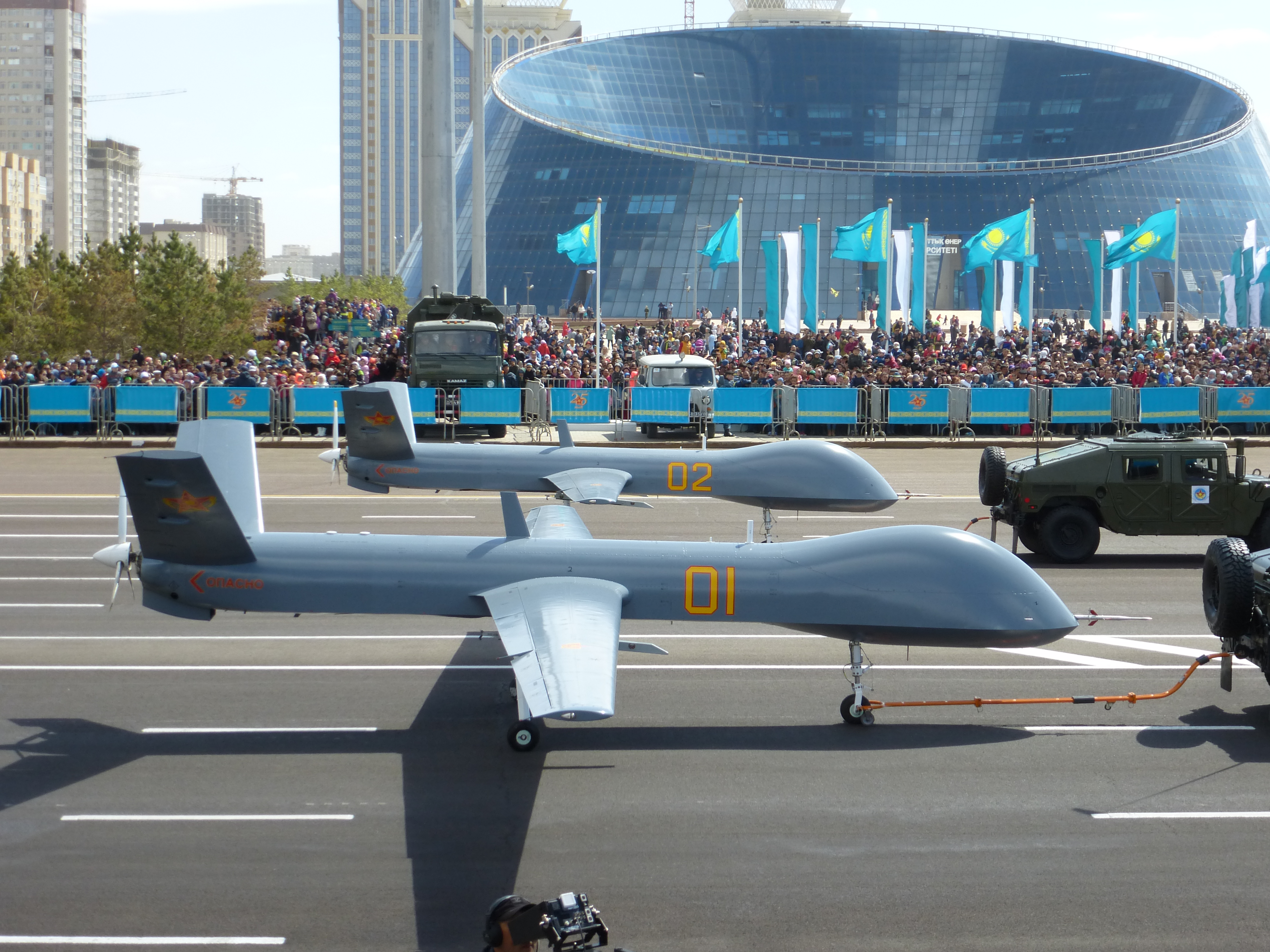
A Kazakh Air Force CAIG Wing Loong during a Defender of the Fatherland Day parade on Independence Square in Nur-Sultan.

- China — 60 units, in service with the People's Liberation Army Air Force
- Egypt — Reportedly exported to as early as 2016, first images released by the Egyptian military in October 2018.
- Ethiopia
- Indonesia
- Kazakhstan — Two exported to in 2016, in service with the Kazakhstan Air Defence Forces
- Morocco — Reportedly donated to Morocco as a gift from UAE in 2020.
- Nigeria
- Pakistan — A Wing Loong crashed in Pakistan on 18 June 2016, raising theories the country may be evaluating the system. A Pakistani defence ministry official told a reporter that an unnamed UAV crashed on an "experimental flight", further fueling evaluating theories. Two years later in October 2018, it was announced that Pakistan Aeronautical Complex and Chengdu Aircraft Corporation would jointly produce 48 Wing Loong II UAVs for use in the Pakistan Air Force.
- Saudi Arabia — Exported to in 2014
- Serbia — Purchased 9
- United Arab Emirates — Exported to in 2011, launch customer for Wing Loong II in 2017.
- Uzbekistan

== Specifications (Wing Loong I) ==
Data from ,

General characteristics

- Crew: None (UAV)
- Length: 9.05 m (29 ft 8 in)
- Wingspan: 14 m (45 ft 11 in)
- Height: 2.77 m (9 ft 1 in)
- Gross weight: 1,100 kg (2,425 lb)
- Powerplant: 1 × Rotax 914 turbocharged, 75 kW (100 shp)
- Propellers: 3-bladed

Performance

- Maximum speed: 280 km/h (170 mph, 150 kn)
- Range: 4,000 km (2,500 mi, 2,200 nmi)
- Endurance: 20 hours
- Service ceiling: 5,000 m (16,000 ft)

Armament

- 200 kilograms (440 lb) of air-to-surface weapons
  - Bombs
    - FT-10
    - FT-9
    - FT-7
    - GB7
    - GB4
  - Missiles
    - BRM1
    - AKD-10

Avionics

- 100 kilograms (220 lb) capacity for sensors

== See also ==
- Chengdu GJ-2
- Chengdu WZ-10
- Chengdu Wing Loong-3
- Mohajer 10

Aircraft of comparable role, configuration, and era

- BAE Mantis
- General Atomics MQ-1 Predator
- TAI Anka
- Elbit Hermes 900

Related lists

- List of Chinese aircraft
- List of unmanned aerial vehicles of the People's Republic of China
