= PL-4 (missile) =

- Type: air-to-air missile
- Place of origin: China

Service history
- Used by: China

Specifications
- Mass: 150 kg
- Length: 3.2 m
- Warhead: High explosive blast-fragmentation 30 kilograms (66 lb)
- Engine: Solid fuel rocket
- Operational range: 18 km
- Maximum speed: 2695 km/h
- Guidance system: Semi-active radar homing (PL-4A); Infrared homing (PL-4B)
- Launch platform: aerial

The PL-4 (Chinese: 霹雳-4; pinyin: Pī Lì-4; lit. 'Thunderbolt-4') was an air-to-air missile (AAM) developed by the People's Republic of China. It was designed by the 612 Research Institute and the Zhuzhou Aeroengine factory. The first version, the PL-4A, was China's first semi-active radar homing (SARH) AAM. It was developed into the infrared homing PL-4B.

== Development ==
The development program of PL-4 started in March 1966. The design may have been influenced by American AIM-7D Sparrow wreckage from the Vietnam War. Prototype ground-testing to the original 1960s requirements was completed in November 1980, with the second phase of development starting in July 1981. The program was canceled in 1984 due to obsolescence and, with the normalization of relations with the United States - the availability of modern Western weapons.

The PL-4 was intended to arm the Chengdu J-9 - which was canceled in 1980 - and then the Shenyang J-8II. Issues with the J-8II's Type 208 radar limited SARH performance, and the missile's cancellation severely affected the aircraft's development.

== Variants ==
PL-4A
SARH version
PL-4B
IRH version
Fenglei-7 (Chinese: 风雷-7)
Anti-radiation missile based on PL-4, with technologies reverse-engineered from AGM-45 Shrike collected from Vietnam War. It was developed between 1977 and 1984 but was eventually canceled.
