= Chengdu J-9 =

Chinese interceptor aircraft project

J-9
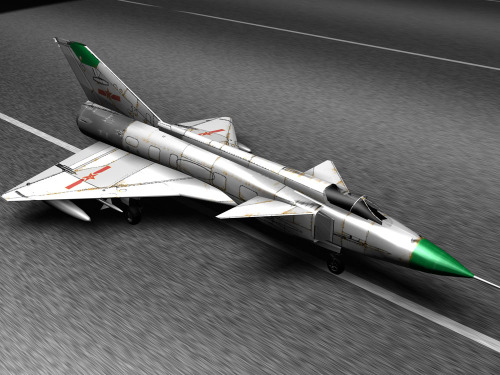
- An artist's rendering of the J-9B-VI

General information
- Type: Interceptor
- National origin: China
- Manufacturer: National 132nd Factory
- Designer: 611 Institute
- Status: Cancelled

History
- Initiated: 1964
- Concluded: 1980

The Chengdu J-9 (Chinese: 歼-9) was an interceptor aircraft that was cancelled during development in the People's Republic of China (PRC). It was proposed in 1964 by the 601 Institute in Shenyang as a higher-performing alternative to the Shenyang J-8. Development was disrupted by the Cultural Revolution and frequently changing requirements; in addition, development was transferred to the National 132nd Factory and the 611 Institute in Chengdu. The program was cancelled in 1980.

== Development ==
By 1964, the Chengdu J-7 was inadequate to perform long-range, high-altitude interceptions. The Chinese Aeronautical Establishment held a conference on 25 October to discuss future fighters. The 601 Institute had two proposals; a twin-engined "scaled-up" J-7 which became the Shenyang J-8, and a higher-performing single-engined option that became the J-9. The J-9 was technically riskier; it was not based on an existing design, and the required engine—an afterburning turbofan generating 83 kN (19,000 lbf) dry and 121 kN (27,000 lbf) reheat thrust—did not exist in China. Shenyang developed a delta and a double-delta concept in 1965.

Development was officially approved following a Ministry of Aerospace Industry (MAI) conference on 12–17 January 1966 with the goal of either an air superiority fighter or a pure interceptor. This was revised on 1 April with new requirements for endurance, rate of climb, and significantly increased range. A development schedule was approved on 12 April. Shenyang responded first with the J-9A-IV (a tailed delta with lateral intakes) and then the J-9B-V (a tailless-delta); the former was unable to meet requirements. The Cultural Revolution paused development. Development on the J-9B-V resumed in 1968. The goal of flying a prototype by the 20th anniversary of the PRC in October 1969 could not be achieved due to major development problems. The MAI shifted work back to the J-9A-IV. In addition, development was transferred to Chengdu because Shenyang was now fully occupied with the J-8. Wang Shounan became the new chief designer.

The Ministry of National Defense issued new requirements on 9 June 1970—and slightly revised in November—for even greater range, speed, and altitude. Chengdu abandoned the J-9A-IV, and reworked the J-9B-V into the J-9B-VI. The J-9B-VI was a canard-delta with lateral intakes; a single ventral intake was rejected. The intended engine, the Woshan WS-6 turbofan, encountered development problems; a reverse-engineered Khachaturov R29-300 turbojet, to be called the WP-15, was selected as a less powerful alternative.

The requirements were revised in February 1975, calling for more range and an armament of four PL-4 air-to-air missiles. In November, the State Planning Commission approved funding for five prototypes, with the first flight to take place in late 1980 or early 1981. However, the program was ended in 1980.

== Specifications (J-9B-VI) ==
Data from Chinese Aircraft: China's Aviation Industry Since 1951

General characteristics

- Wing area: 55.7 m^{2} (600 sq ft) including canards
- Empty weight: 13,000 kg (28,660 lb)
- Powerplant: 1 × Woshan WS-6 turbofan engine, 122.5 kN (27,500 lbf) thrust , or "WP-15" (reverse-engineered Khachaturov R29-300) turbojet, 81 kN (18,000 lbf) thrust

Performance

- Maximum speed: Mach 2.5 at 23,000 m (75,000 ft)
- Range: 2,000 km (1,200 mi, 1,100 nmi)
- Rate of climb: 220 m/s (43,000 ft/min)

Armament

- Missiles: 4 × PL-4 air-to-air missiles

Avionics
Type 205 radar

== See also ==
- Chengdu J-10

Aircraft of comparable role, configuration, and era

- Dassault Mirage 4000
- Saab 37 Viggen
- Mikoyan-Gurevich Ye-8

Related lists

- List of fighter aircraft
