= Chengdu Aircraft Research and Design Institute =

Chinese research institute

AVIC Chengdu Aircraft Research and Design Institute
- 成都飞机设计研究所
- Established: 1970
- Research type: Aerospace, Defence
- Location: 89 Wuhouci Street, Wuhou District, Chengdu, Sichuan, China
- Affiliations: AVIC
- Website: cadi.ac.cn (archived)

AVIC Chengdu Aircraft Research and Design Institute (CADI; 成都飞机设计研究所; historically the 611 Institute) is a design institute that works with the Chengdu Aircraft Industry Group for military aircraft. Built in 1970, it covers an area of 310,000 square meters.

== History ==
In May 1970, the Shenyang design team for the J-9 moved to Chengdu; this was part of the "Third Line" program that moved defence industries to the interior to make them less vulnerable to foreign attack. The team was later renamed as the 611 Institute.

The design work on the cancelled double-canard J-9 influenced later CADI designs. The Chengdu J-10 used the double-canard layout. The Chengdu J-20 also used canards.

== Products ==
- CAC FC-1 / JF-17
- Chengdu J-10
- Chengdu J-20
- CAIG Wing Loong

=== Sichuan Tengden ===
Designed by branch Sichuan Tengden

- Tengden TB-001

== See also ==
- Tu Jida, former chief designer at the institute
- J-XX
- Shenyang Aircraft Design Institute
