= Chengdu Aircraft Corporation =

Chinese aeronautics company

AVIC Chengdu Aircraft Industrial (Group) Co., Ltd.
- Native name: 中航工业成都飞机工业（集团）有限责任公司
- Company type: Subsidiary
- Industry: Aerospace, defense
- Founded: 1958; 68 years ago
- Headquarters: Chengdu, Sichuan, China
- Key people: Wang Guangya (Chairman)
- Products: Military aircraft
- Number of employees: 20,000
- Parent: Aviation Industry Corporation of China
- Website: cac.avic.com

Chengdu Aircraft Corporation
- Simplified Chinese: 成都飞机工业集团
- Traditional Chinese: 成都飛機工業集團
Transcriptions
Standard Mandarin
- Hanyu Pinyin: Chéngdū Fēijī Gōngyè Jítuán

AVIC Chengdu Aircraft Industrial (Group) Co., Ltd., traditionally and more commonly known as Chengdu Aircraft Corporation (CAC), a subsidiary of AVIC, is a Chinese aerospace conglomerate that designs and manufactures combat aircraft and aircraft parts. It was founded in 1958 as the National 132nd Factory in Chengdu, Sichuan, to be an aircraft supplier for the Chinese military.

Chengdu Aircraft Corporation designed and now produces the Chengdu J-10 light-weight multi-role fighter and Chengdu J-20 fifth-generation jet fighter, that are considered to be two of the most advanced weapons in China's inventory, as well as the CAC/PAC FC-1 Xiaolong very light-weight multi-role fighter that is produced in cooperation with Pakistan.

Chengdu Aircraft Corporation has been cited for its success in developing China's first fifth-generation aircraft and stealth fighter jet. Its development led China to become the second country in the world and the first country in Asia to possess fifth-generation and stealth technology.

== History ==
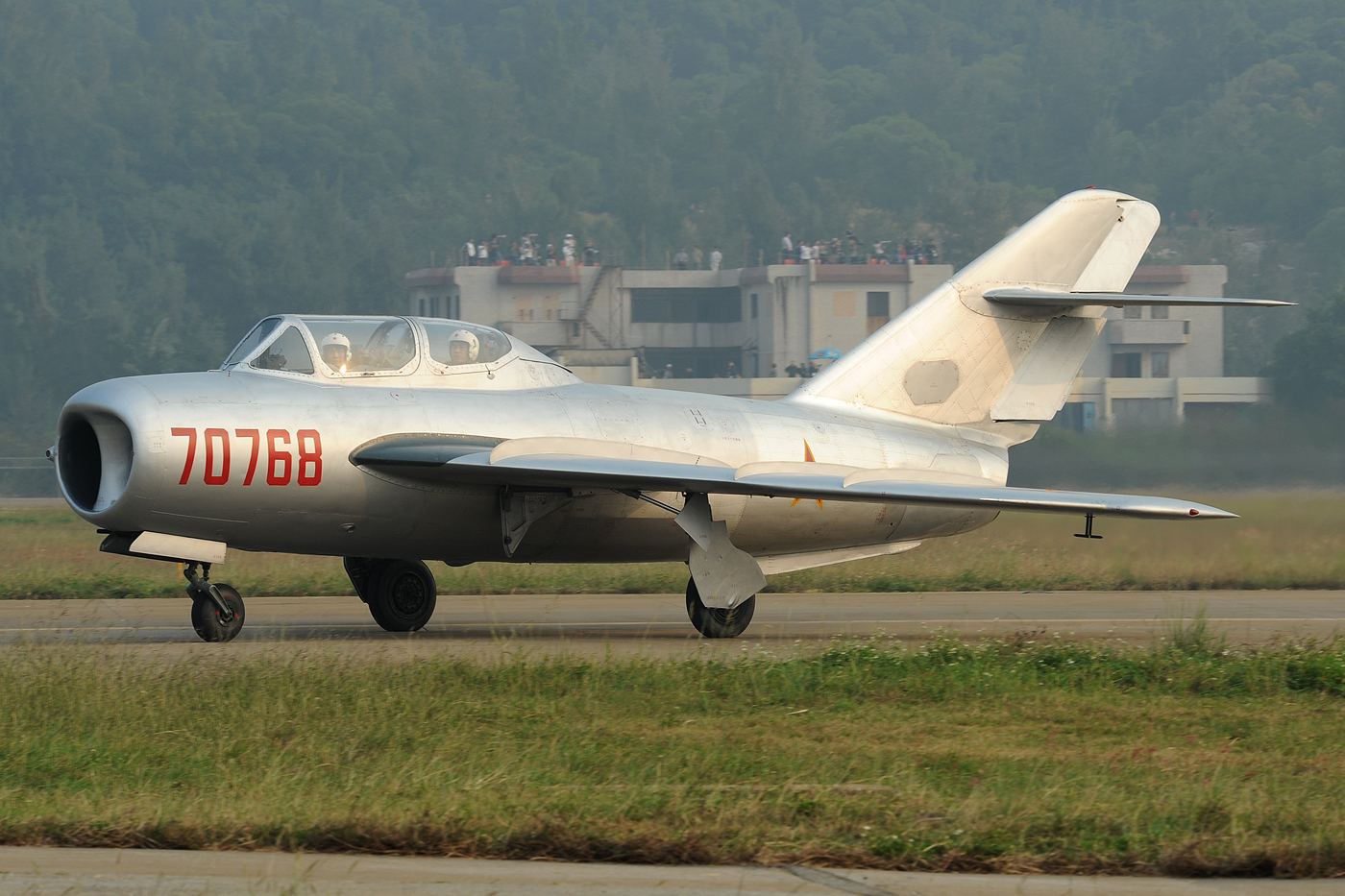
The FT-5

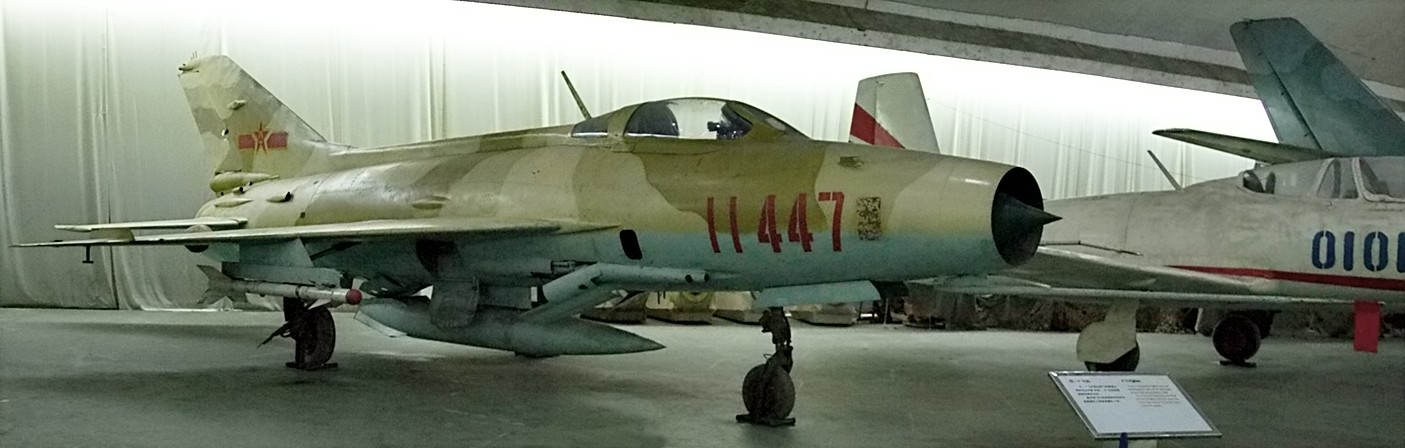
The J-7I at the Chinese Aviation Museum

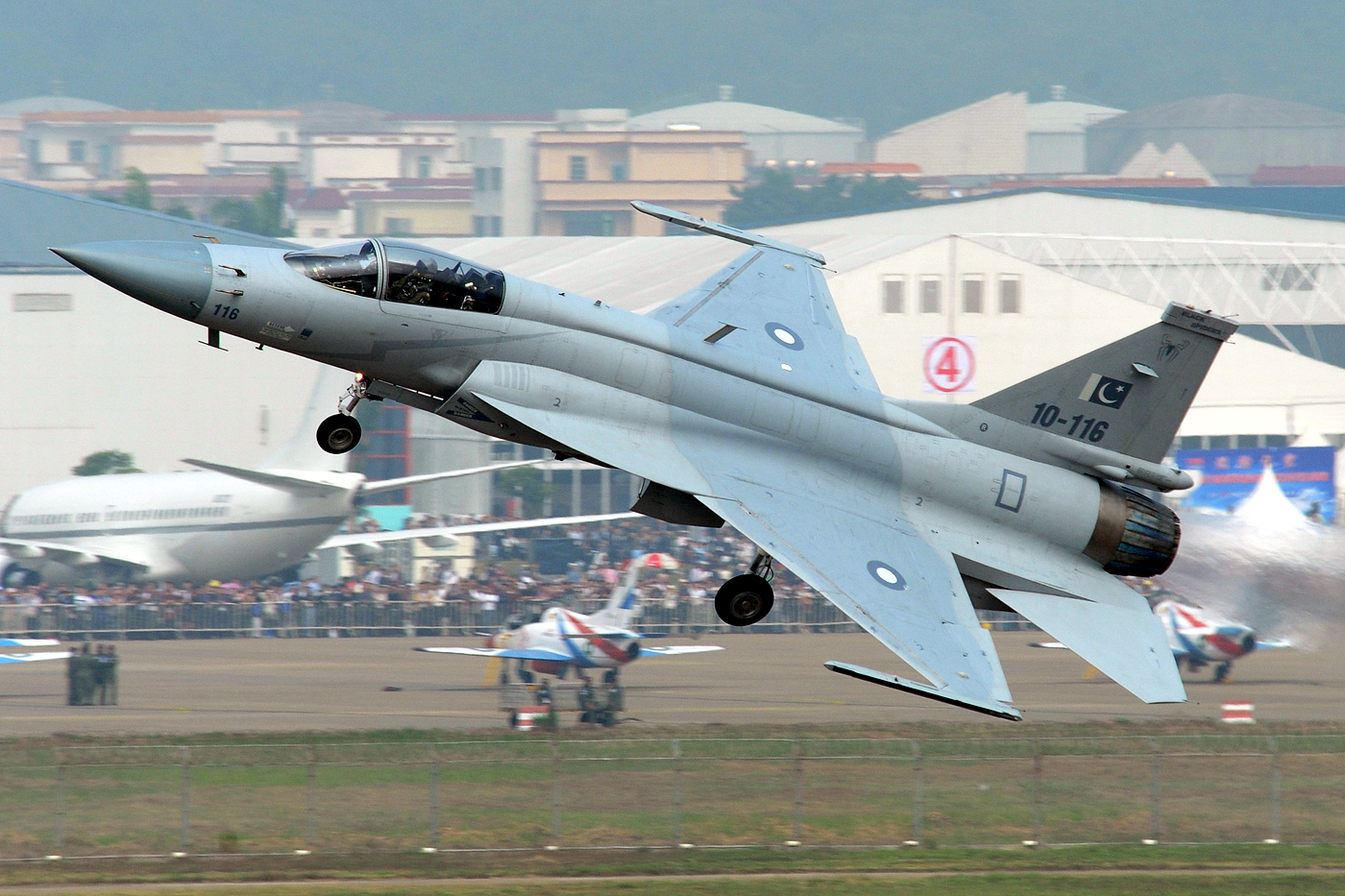
The JF-17 / FC-1

In April 1956 an agreement was signed by China with the Soviet Union which included assistance with China's aviation industry. This included the No. 132 fighter manufacturing plant construction project. Construction started on 18 October 1958 and was basically completed in October 1964. A total of 180 million yuan was invested, the plant covered 507.4 hectares and employed 10,485 people. The first J-5 fighter to be produced made a successful maiden flight in November 1964. The J-5 was then modified into a dual-seat model, the FT-5, whose maiden flight occurred in May 1966. The factory was also preparing to begin manufacture of the J-7. With the beginning of the Cultural Revolution in 1966 the plant was put under military control until 1972.

With the end of the Cultural Revolution in 1976, the No. 132 factory began a new period of development and the facility's focus was slowly shifted to scientific research and production. The maiden flight of the J-7I occurred in March 1970 and in 1975 the J-7II was designed. It was decided that the J-7 required a comprehensive transformation of the plant. Until 1985 an 80,642 square meter workshop was built with new equipment and an annual production capacity of almost 200 J-7 fighters. In 1979 the No. 132 plant was introduced to the outside world as Chengdu Aircraft Company and began exporting military products as well as gradually providing products for civilian use, motorcycles for example. In 1982 the aviation industry of China began to be re-organised and CAC was one of the institutions to be focused on. During the process CAC was re-organised with the principle of "unified leadership and decentralised management".

CAC began using advanced foreign technology and equipment to improve its existing products and speed up development of new products. These were for export as well as the domestic market. The J-7A, F-7IIA, F-7B, F-7M and F-7III were developed and exported to over 10 countries. Developing and producing the J-7M in 1984 was an important achievement as it was then China's most advanced light fighter aircraft. In 1985 the company established a quality assurance system for its military products and was exploring the development of civilian products such as light vehicles, motorcycles, dry cleaning machines, windows and tooling for civilian enterprises. Factories for building hydraulic landing gear fixtures, motorcycle engines, moulds, model aircraft and dry cleaning machinery were established in 1987 and CAC became one of 19 motorcycle production sites. In 1988 a sub-contracting arrangement with the United States was formed and CAC was involved with the production of the McDonnell Douglas MD-80. In 1989 CAC was again re-organised into Chengdu Aircraft Industrial Corporation and promoted to a state enterprise in 1990. The first MD-80 nose section was delivered in 1991.

By 1992, CAC's motorcycle and jack factories were placed under the control of a new company for civilian products and, in 1992, CAC was recognised as a large industrial enterprise in China's aviation industry. The company reformed its wage system and structure in 1993. A quota reduction of 22.3%, 11.9% in staff levels was set. The company's automotive mould production factory was also re-organised. Further reforms to the labour system occurred in 1994, with greater attention paid to business regulation and workers' rights. Sub-contracting production projects were expanded in 1995 with firms in the U.S. (McDonnell Douglas and Boeing), South Korea and Singapore. The company's sales revenue in non-aviation products exceeded 1 million for the first time in 1996 after increased focus on this area. CAC later began producing Airbus A320 and Boeing 757 components, such as vertical and horizontal tails. The company also achieved ISO9001 quality certification in avionics.

The first flight of the Chengdu J-10 fighter in 1998 was an achievement that proved the company's ability to produce China's third generation of fighter technology. In 2002 the first prototypes of the FC-1 / Super-7 fighter, jointly developed with Pakistan, were completed. Digital design, manufacturing and management techniques were developed during this time. The J-7G also made its maiden flight and contracts were signed with Dassault for production of Falcon 2000EX fuel tanks.

== Facilities ==
- Chengdu Airframe Plant
- Chengdu Engine Company - founded as Chengdu Aero-Engine Factory in 1958 and located at a 137 ha (338.5 acres) plant employing 20,000
- Chengdu Aircraft Design Institute
- Wenjiang Airbase (Zh-Wiki)

== Products ==
=== Aircraft ===
- Chengdu JJ-5 (JianJiao-5) basic jet trainer; export model designated FT-5
- Chengdu J-7 - Lightweight interceptor; export models designated F-7 (Operational / No longer in Production)
  - Project Sabre II
- Chengdu J-9 - Cancelled interceptor fighter project from the 1970s (Prototype / Canceled)
- Chengdu J-10 - 4th generation multi-role fighter (Operational / In Production)
- FC-1 Xiaolong/JF-17 Thunder - 4th generation Lightweight multi-role fighter (Operational / In Production)
- Chengdu J-20 - Fifth generation stealth fighter (Operational / In production)
- Chengdu J-36 - Stealth fighter (In development)

=== Business Jet ===
- CBJ800 - Large Business Jet in development

=== Aircraft parts ===
- ACAC ARJ21 nose section
- Chinese licensee of McDonnell Douglas MD-80 / MD-90
- Parts supplier for Northrop Grumman
- Empennage (horizontal stabilizer, vertical fin and tail section) for the Boeing 757
- Parts and maintenance tools for Airbus

=== Engines ===
- licensed version of RD-500K turbojet
- WP6 turbojet - Chinese version of Tumansky RD-9
- LM WP13 turbojet - Chinese version of Tumansky R-13
- components to support users of the Pratt & Whitney JT8D turbofan

=== Unmanned Aerial Vehicles ===
- Chengdu Winglong
- Chengdu Xianglong

== See also ==
- Aviation Industry Corporation of China (AVIC)
- ACAC consortium
- Changhe Aircraft Industries Corporation
- Guizhou Aircraft Industry Co.
- Harbin Aircraft Industry Group
- Hongdu Aviation Industry Corporation
- Shanghai Aviation Industrial Company
- Shaanxi Aircraft Company
- Shenyang Aircraft Corporation
- Xi'an Aircraft Industrial Corporation
