= Changhe Z-18 =

Chinese medium-lift transport helicopter

Z-18
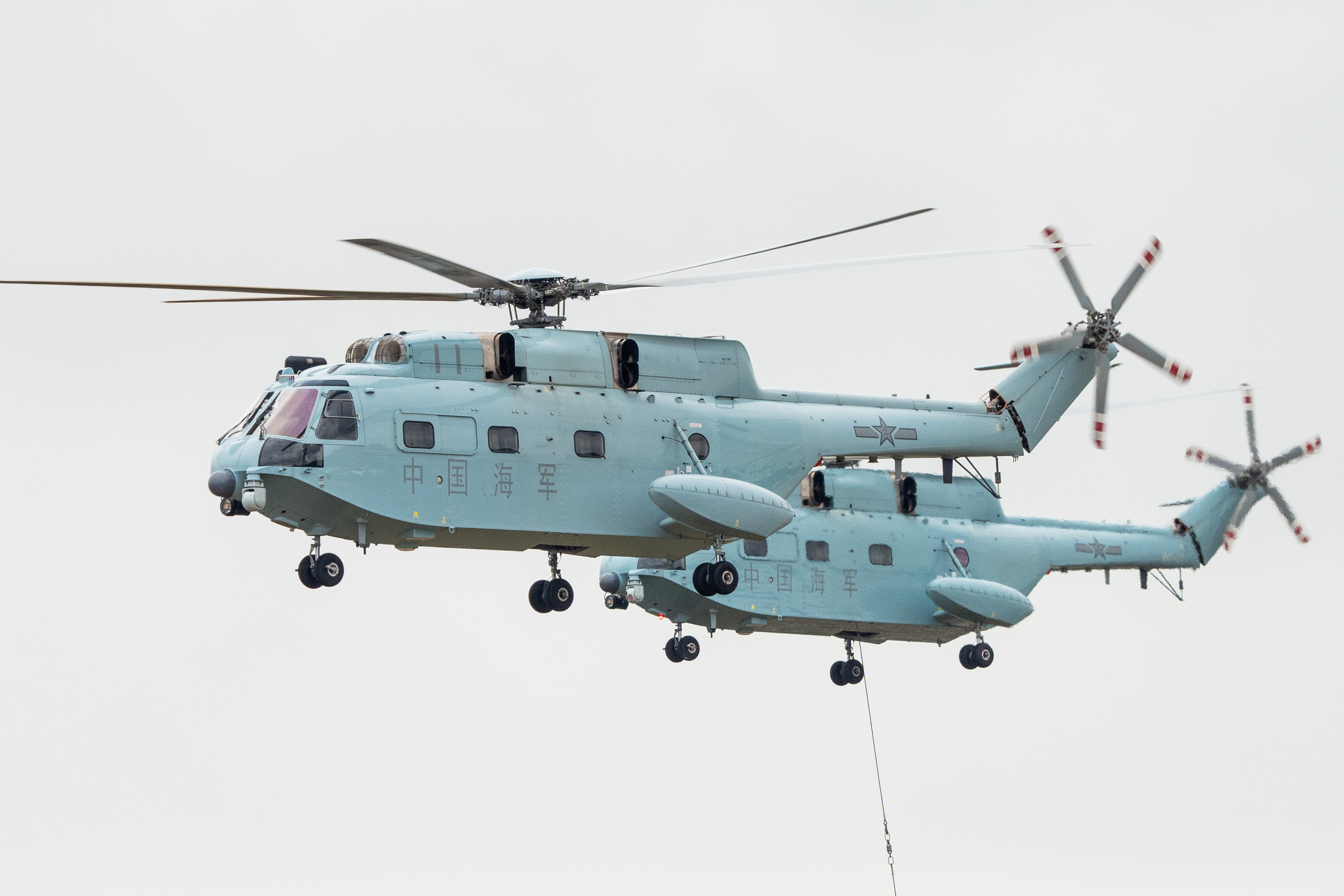
- PLA Navy Z-18 in Zhuhai Airshow 2024, with the visible folding tail

General information
- Type: Utility helicopter
- National origin: China
- Manufacturer: Avicopter (Changhe Aircraft Industries Corporation)
- Status: In service, in production
- Primary user: People's Liberation Army

History
- Introduction date: 2018
- First flight: 2014
- Developed from: Avicopter AC313

The Changhe Z-18, also known as Z-8G, is a medium-lift transport helicopter developed by Changhe Aircraft Industries Corporation (CAIC) to replace the Changhe Z-8.

== Design and development ==
The Z-18 is a development of the Avicopter AC313 and Changhe Z-8, both of which are developments of the Aérospatiale SA 321 Super Frelon.

Notable changes include a redesigned lower fuselage similar to the AC313 which results in larger internal space. It also reportedly makes greater use of titanium and composites in its rotor blades and rotor, and replaces the Z-8's boat-shaped lower fuselage with a tail ramp for small vehicles. It has a glass cockpit and is powered by three WZ-6C turboshafts.

The Z-18's maximum takeoff weight (MTOW) is 13.8 tonnes. In late-2014, the only People's Liberation Army Navy (PLAN) ships able to operate the helicopter at MTOW were aircraft carriers and large amphibious assault ships.

== Operational history ==
The Z-18F anti-submarine warfare (ASW) version was undergoing testing by the end of August 2014.

The army transport Z-18A first appeared in Chinese state media in December 2014, and reportedly underwent high-altitude testing on the Tibetan Plateau in January 2015. The Z-18A reached an altitude of 9,000 m (29,528 ft) during testing.

The Z-18A was in service with the People's Liberation Army Ground Force (PLAGF) by January 2018.

== Variants ==
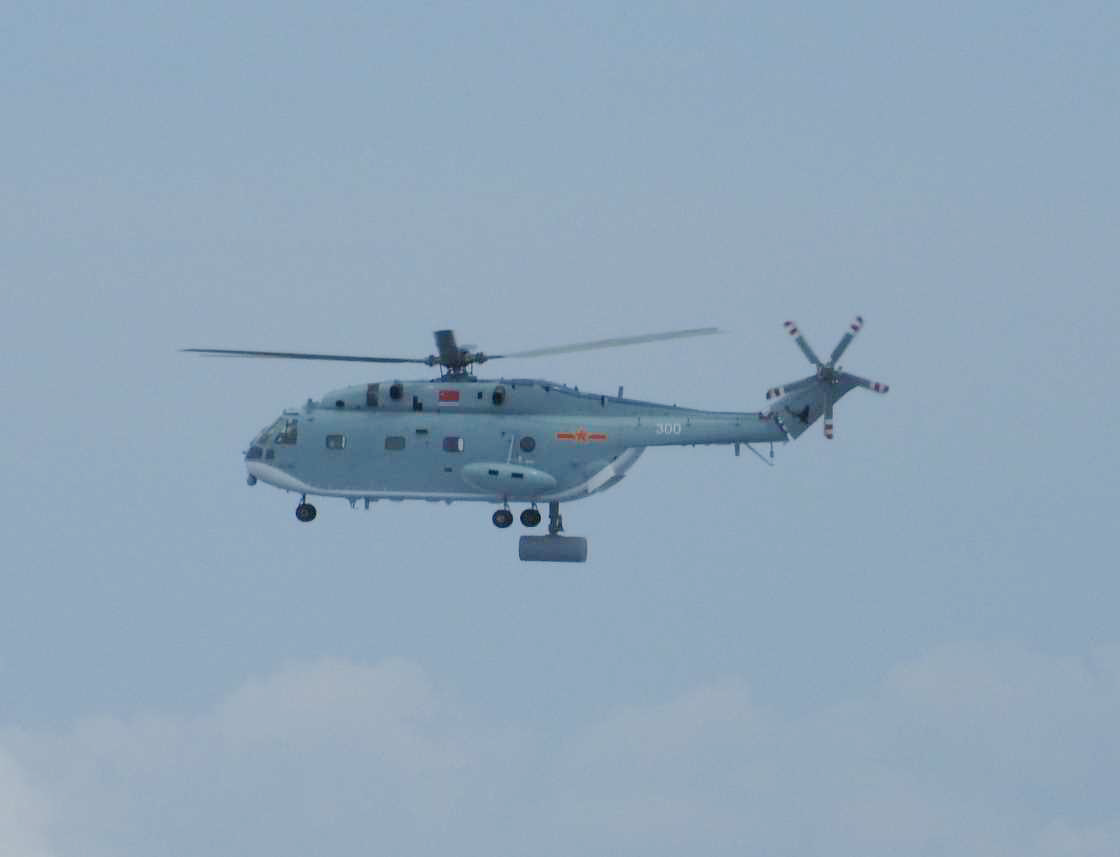
PLANAF Changhe Z-18J AEW from the aircraft carrier Liaoning

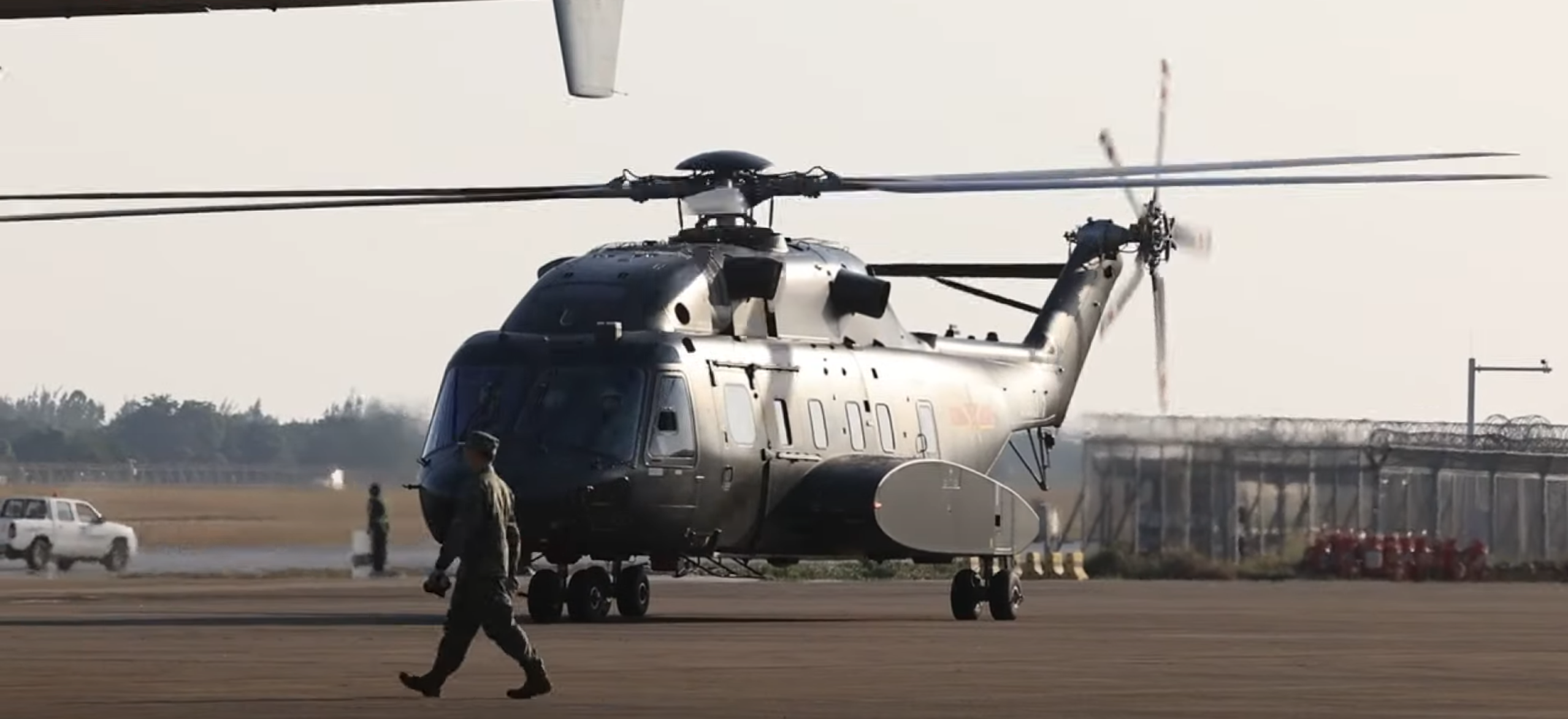
PLAGF Z-8L with its widened airframe

- Z-18: Naval transport variant with folding tail boom and rotor blades. Features a nose-mounted weather radar and FLIR/TV turret.
- Z-18A / Z-8G: Transport variant with extended nose expected to replace Z-8A/B. Features a nose-mounted terrain-following radar. Multiple subvariants with differing equipment configurations such as: SATCOM fairing on tailboom, flare/chaff launchers + MAWS/RWR/LWR sensors on fuselage and sponsons, QJH001 machine gun on side door, ECM equipment on fuselage, retractable SAR radar replacing rear ramp, etc.
  - Z-8L: Transport variant with wide-body fuselage and enlarged fuel sponsons, first spotted in January 2019. The internal width of the load area has been increased from 1.8m to 2.4 m, making it larger than old Z-8 and SA321 variants. Features a nose mounted terrain-following radar. Multiple subvariants with differing equipment configurations such as: SATCOM fairing on tailboom, flare launchers + LWR/RWR sensors on sponsons, RWR/MAWS sensors on front fuselage, roof-mounted FLIR, etc.
- Z-18F: ASW variant with chin-mounted surface search radar, dipping sonar, and may be equipped with up to four lightweight torpedoes and 32 sonobuoys.
- Z-18J: Airborne early warning (AEW) variant, with a lowerable radar antenna in place of the ramp. The radar has a range of 320 km.

== Operators ==
China

- People's Liberation Army Ground Force Aviation - 30 units of Z-8L
- People's Liberation Army Naval Air Force - 4 units of Z-18, 10 units of Z-18F, 4 units of Z-18J and 13 units of Z-8J

== Specifications (Z-18F) ==
Data from Military Today

General characteristics

- Crew: 2 flight crew
- Capacity:
  - 27-30 troops or
  - 15 stretchers or
  - small vehicles or 5 tonnes of cargo to a range of up to 1000 km. (Z-18A)
- Length: 23.05 m (75 ft 7 in) (overall, rotors turning)
- Height: 7 m (23 ft 0 in)
- Empty weight: 7,000 kg (15,432 lb)
- Max takeoff weight: 13,800 kg (30,360 lb)
- Powerplant: 3 × WZ-6C turboshafts
- Main rotor diameter: 19 m (62 ft 4 in)
- Maximum speed: 336 km/h (209 mph, 181 kn)
- Service ceiling: 9,000 m (29,528 ft)

Armament

- Up to 4 Yu-7 ASW torpedoes or YJ-9 anti-ship missiles
- Up to 32 sonobuoys

== See also ==
Related development

- Aérospatiale Super Frelon
- Avicopter AC313
- Changhe Z-8

Aircraft of comparable role, configuration, and era

- AgustaWestland AW101
- Mil Mi-38
- NHIndustries NH90
- Sikorsky S-92
- Sikorsky MH-60R Seahawk

Related lists

- List of rotorcraft
