= Avicopter AC313 =

Chinese civilian helicopter

AC313
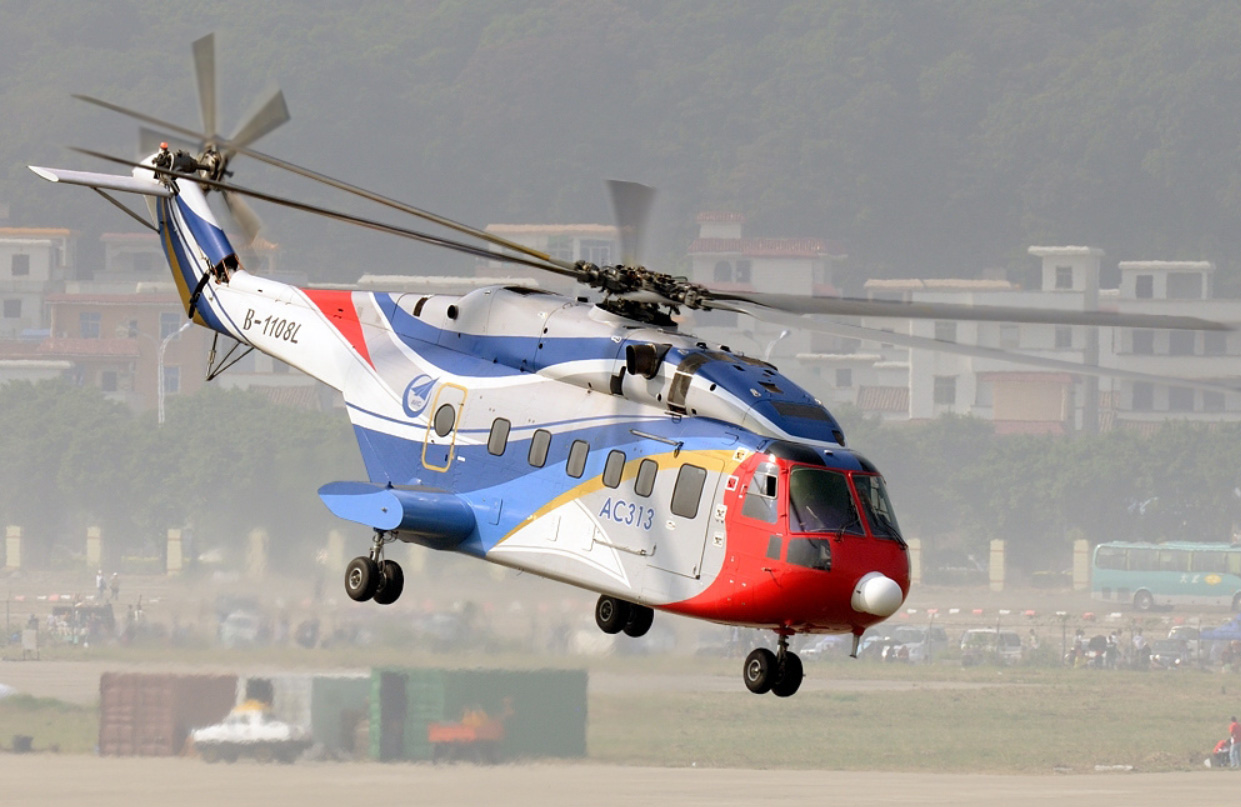
- The AC313 makes it first public demonstration flight at the Zhuhai Air Show in November 2010.

General information
- Type: Helicopters
- National origin: China
- Manufacturer: Avicopter
- Status: In service

History
- Manufactured: 2010-present
- Introduction date: Dec 5, 2013
- First flight: 18 March 2010
- Developed from: Changhe Z-8
- Variant: Changhe Z-18

The Avicopter AC313 (also known as the Changhe Z-8F-100) is a civilian helicopter built by Avicopter (AVIC Helicopter Company). It is a development of the earlier Changhe Z-8, itself a locally produced version of the Aerospatiale Super Frelon.

== Design and development ==
The AC313 is an updated design based on the earlier Harbin Z-8, itself a development of the Aérospatiale Super Frelon. The prototype first flew at Jingdezhen, Jiangxi on 18 March 2010. It is designed to carry 18 passengers, has a reported maximum range of 1,050 kilometres, and a maximum takeoff weight of 13 tonnes.

It is equipped with three Pratt & Whitney Canada PT6B-67A engines, the AC313 is a single-rotor helicopter with tail rotors, side-by-side pilot seating, and a non-retractable landing gear. Although based on a 1960s design, the AC313 has been developed to use composite materials for the rotor blade and titanium main rotor. Composite materials are used on 50% of the helicopter, and titanium is used for the remainder. The interior comes equipped with a modern integrated digital avionics system and has a cabin height of 1.83 m and 23.5 m^{3} in space. Designed to carry 27 passengers and two crew in the transport role, it has also been designed to be used for VIP transport, medical evacuations (where it can carry 15 casualties), and for search and rescue operations. In terms of cargo, it can carry up to 4 tonnes internally or 5 tonnes on a sling. AC313 is equipped with an electronic flight instrument system.

The AC313 is only the second helicopter to be able to operate in the Qinghai-Tibet Plateau, the first being Sikorsky S-70C Black Hawk. The flight testing period for the 13-tonne AC313 was conducted in Hulunbuir City, Inner Mongolia, starting in January, where it was tested to operate in extremely low temperatures as low as minus 46C marking the scope of Asia's largest-tonnage helicopter meeting the mission requirements of the cold climate and the Earth's polar regions. The helicopter also set its speed record of 336 km per hour during the testing period. The AC313 became the first China-made aircraft authorized by China's civil aviation authority in January to fly in high-altitude regions of over 4,500 meters above sea level.

The AC313 has recently received a Type Certificate issued by the Civil Aviation Administration of China (CAAC).

Following Chinese certification, the first five AC313 are to be delivered to Flying Dragon Special Aviation, in 2011, but no aircraft have been delivered yet. Avicopter has plans to certify the AC313 for sale in Europe and the United States. Xu Chaoliang, the chief designer of the helicopter, said the company has so far received 32 orders from national and international customers.

Equipped with an advanced instrument landing system, the helicopter can be used for disaster relief even in blizzard weather in plateau regions.

CAIH, a wholly owned subsidiary of the China Aviation Industry Corp, is expected to produce 300 helicopters annually by 2015, making it one of the major helicopter suppliers in the world. Headquartered in Tianjin, the company is mainly engaged in the research and development, production, maintenance and sales of helicopters and other aircraft and aviation components.

== Variants ==
AC313
Commercial helicopter model derived from Changhe Z-8F.
AC313A
Improved AC313 with significant structural redesign, with enlarged internal load area similar to that of Changhe Z-8L. Maiden flight on 17 May 2022.
Z-8WJ
People's Armed Police (PAP) variant. Combined elements from the Changhe Z-8B and the AC313.

== Operators ==
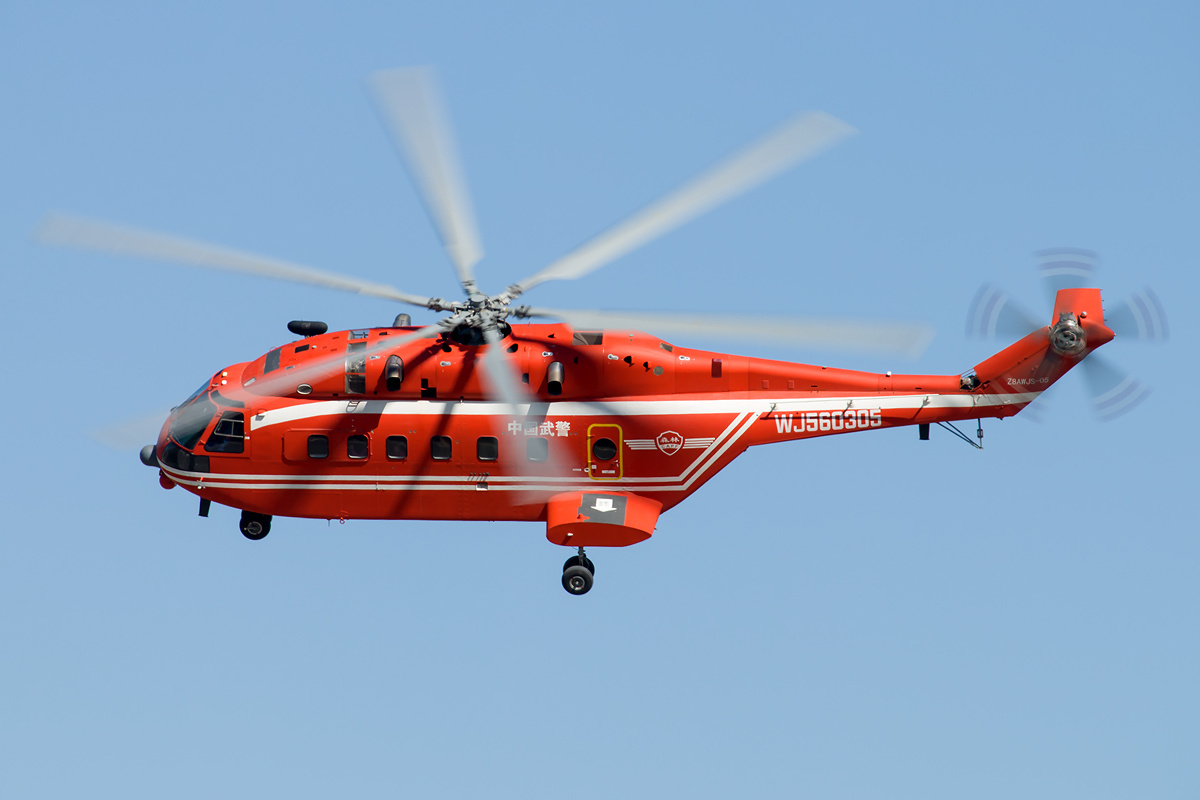
People's Armed Police Forestry Corps Z-8WJ

- China
  - People's Armed Police Forestry Corps - 10 ordered

== Specifications ==
Data from AVIC Changhe Aircraft Industry (Group) Corporation LTD. and Nanchang Municipal Industries and Communications Bureau

General characteristics

- Crew: 2 pilots
- Capacity: 27 passengers or 13 Casualties
- Length: 23.045 m (75 ft 7 in)
- Width: 18.9 m (62 ft 0 in)
- Height: 6.741 m (22 ft 1 in)
- Empty weight: 7,560 kg (16,667 lb)
- Max takeoff weight: 13,000 kg (28,660 lb)
- Fuel capacity: 3800 kg
- Powerplant: 3 × P&W Canada PT6B-67A turboshaft engines

Performance

- Maximum speed: 244 km/h (152 mph, 132 kn)
- Ferry range: 1,050 km (650 mi, 570 nmi)
- Endurance: 5.3 hours
- Rate of climb: 7.6 m/s (1,500 ft/min)

== See also ==
Related development

- Changhe Z-8
- Changhe Z-18

Aircraft of comparable role, configuration, and era

- AgustaWestland AW101
- Sikorsky S-92
- Mil Mi-38

Related lists

- List of rotorcraft
