= Changhe Z-8 =

Chinese military helicopter

Z-8
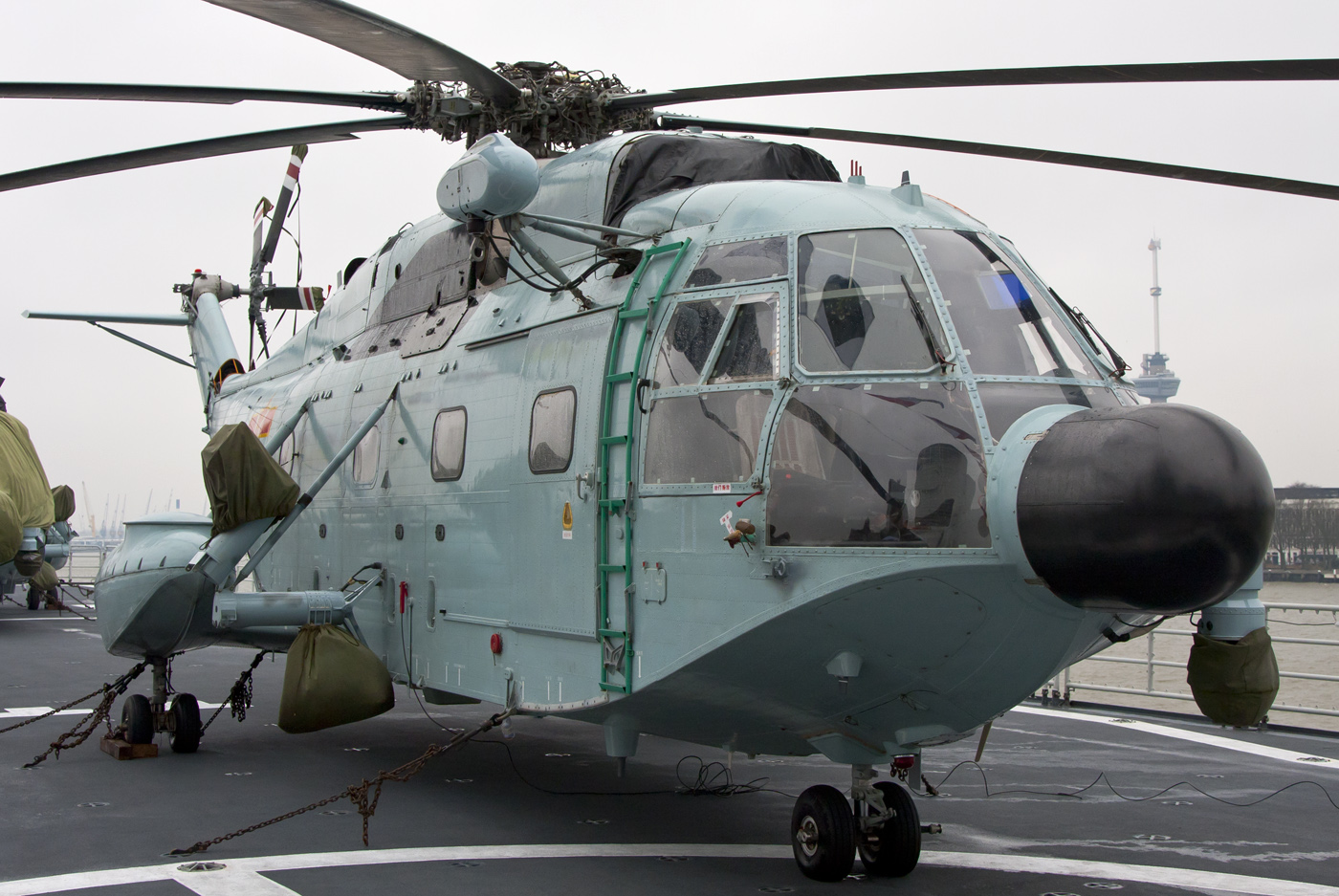
- A PLA Navy Z-8 onboards Changbai Shan (989)

General information
- Type: Transport helicopter
- National origin: China
- Manufacturer: Changhe Aircraft Industries Corporation
- Status: In service
- Primary user: See Operators

History
- Manufactured: 1989–present
- Introduction date: 5 August 1989
- First flight: 11 December 1985
- Developed from: Aérospatiale SA 321 Super Frelon
- Variants: Avicopter AC313; Changhe Z-18

The Changhe Z-8 is a Chinese three-engined heavy-lift military transport helicopter with utility and armed variants, manufactured by Changhe Aircraft Industries Corporation. It is a license-built variant of the French Aérospatiale SA 321 Super Frelon.

== History and development ==
China purchased French SA 321 Super Frelon in the 1970s and began licensed production of the Super Frelon locally in 1976. Developed by the Changhe Aircraft Company, the Chinese production was known as the Z-8. The local production project encountered difficulties and was halted until 1984. On 11 December 1985, the first Chinese-produced Z-8 took its maiden flight, and the second prototype took flight in October 1987. The Z-8 was delivered to the PLA Naval Aviation for trials and used for mine clearance, minelaying, and anti-submarine warfare with the initial production beginning in the same year. On 12 November 1994, the Z-8 was officially certified.

In the 1990s, the Z-8 production slowed because the Chinese Navy did not have sufficient numbers of warships with large enough hangars to accommodate the Z-8. The smaller Harbin Z-9 was preferred. The production numbers were around 15-20. In 2002, a new program began to improve Z-8's avionics and serialization for services in other military branches. The PLA Ground Force requested a utility variant, designated Z-8F, which took its maiden flight in April 2004. The Z-8F was equipped with Pratt & Whitney turboshaft engines. The Z-8 was later derived to a dozen of different variants in all PLA branches, as well as the improved Changhe Z-18.

China has also developed a domestic civil helicopter variant of the Z-8, which is marketed as the Avicopter AC313. The AC313 has a maximum takeoff weight of 13.8 tonnes, is capable of carrying up to 27 passengers, and has a maximum range of 900 km (560 mi).

After the 2008 Sichuan earthquake, Z-8 helicopter production received a massive boost as the event had proved the helicopter's value in humanitarian missions. New engine acquisition and design changes were implemented to improve some of the known issues that had affected the Z-8 for decades. The Chinese People's Armed Police ordered 18 Z-8 helicopters; by 2013, at least five helicopters had been delivered, and most had been assigned to forestry firefighting units. During subsequent earthquake relief operations, Z-8 helicopters have been deployed to perform rescue and logistical missions.

== Variants ==
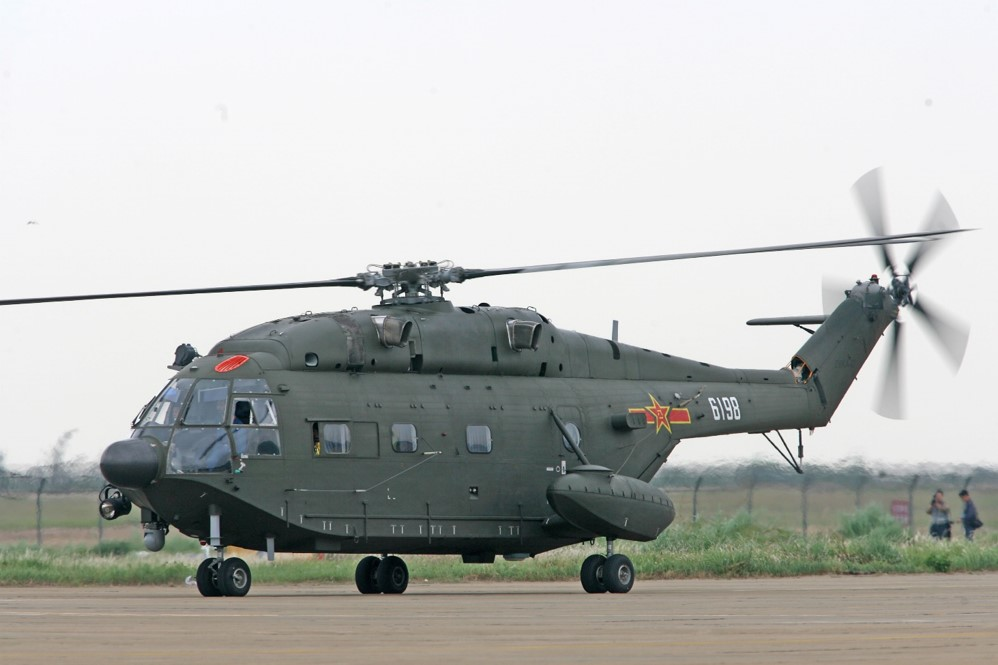
PLA Ground Force Z-8A

Changhe Z-8
Original variant for the People's Liberation Army Naval Air Force (PLA Navy Aviation).
Changhe Z-8A
Improved Z-8 with a higher domestic content rate. Used by the PLA Ground Force.
Changhe Z-8B
Improved Z-8A with digital cockpit and electronic flight control system. Floats removed.
Changhe Z-8C
Interim Z-8 model transitional model with the amphibious Z-8 airframe and Z-18 avionics for the PLA Navy.
Changhe Z-8D
Advanced Z-8 for naval operations and amphibious assault support. Wide-body airframe similar to that of Z-8L.
Changhe Z-8F
Chinese built version with Pratt & Whitney Canada PT6B-67A turboshaft engines. Major improvements include new intake filtration systems, composite rotor wings, de-icing systems, new avionics, new auxiliary power unit (APU), etc.
Changhe Z-8G
Z-8F with major improvements to engines and avionics. Also known as the Changhe Z-18A.

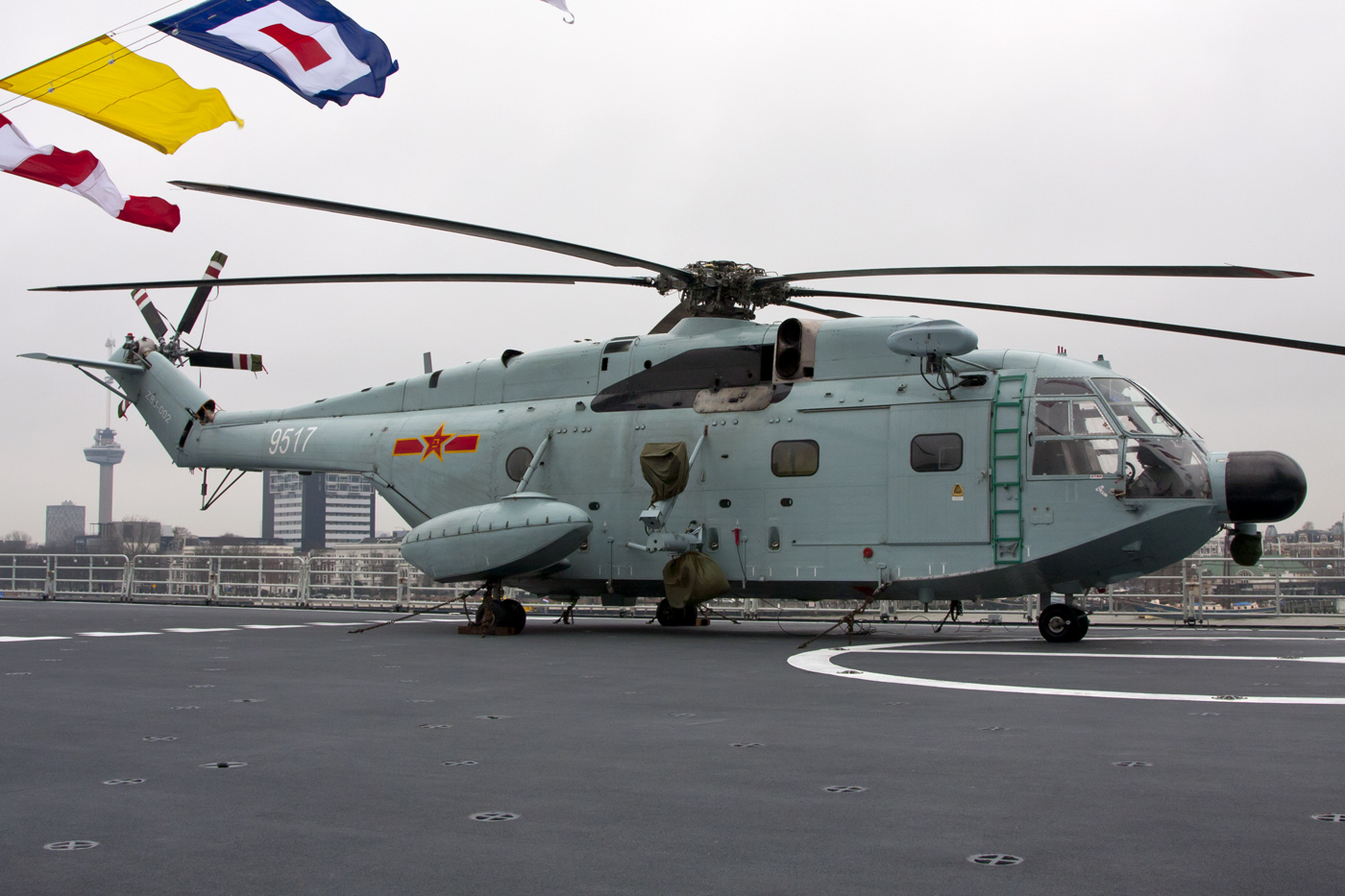
PLA Navy Z-8J

Changhe Z-8J
Improved Z-8B. Used by the PLA Navy.
Changhe Z-8JA
PLA Navy transport variant.
Changhe Z-8JH
PLA Navy medical evacuation (MEDEVAC) variant.
Changhe Z-8S
PLA Navy reconnaissance variant.

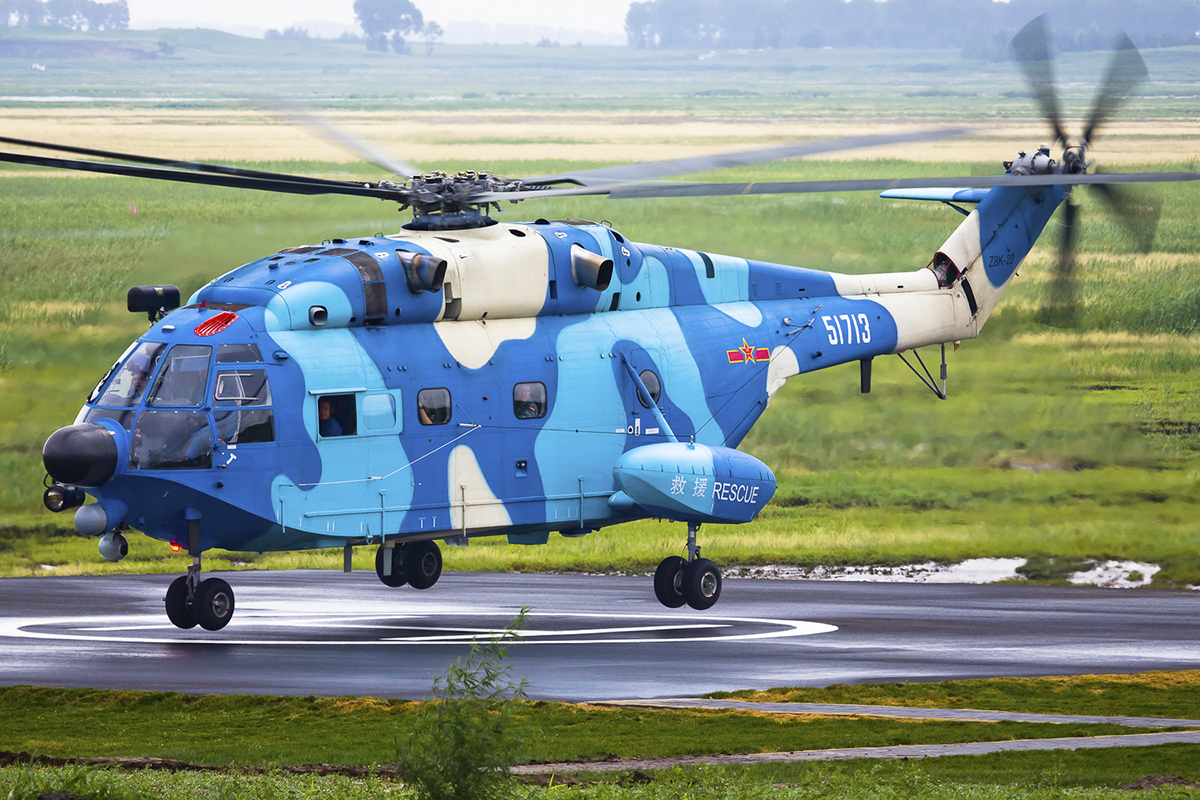
PLA Air Force (PLAAF) Z-8KA

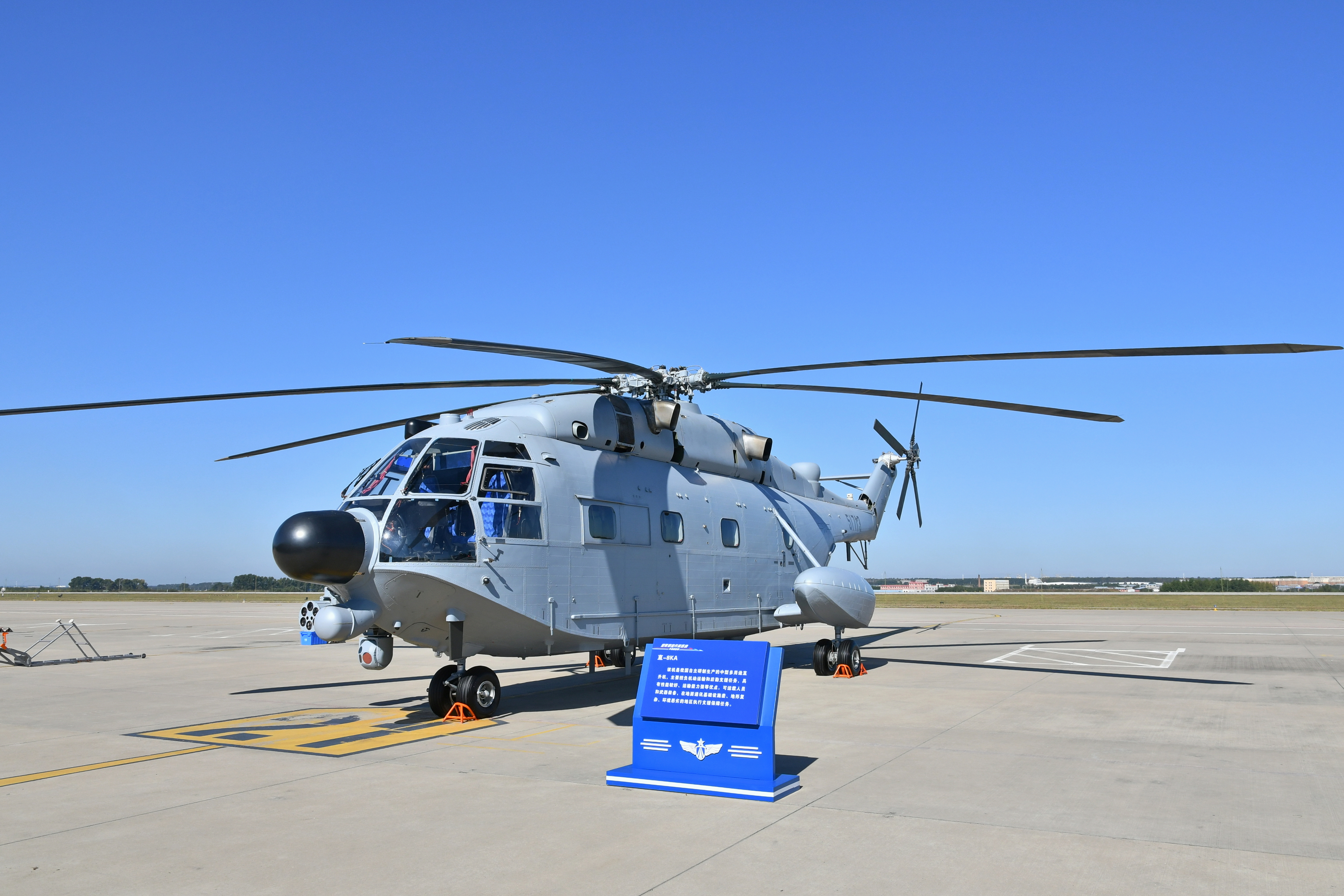
PLA Air Force (PLAAF) Z-8KA (later variant)

Changhe Z-8K
PLA Air Force search and rescue (SAR) variant.
Changhe Z-8KA
PLA Air Force combat search and rescue (CSAR) variant.
Changhe Z-8AEW
Chinese AEW helicopter with retractable radar antenna, AESA radar, 360 degree coverage, redesigned nose similar to the AC313, and FLIR.

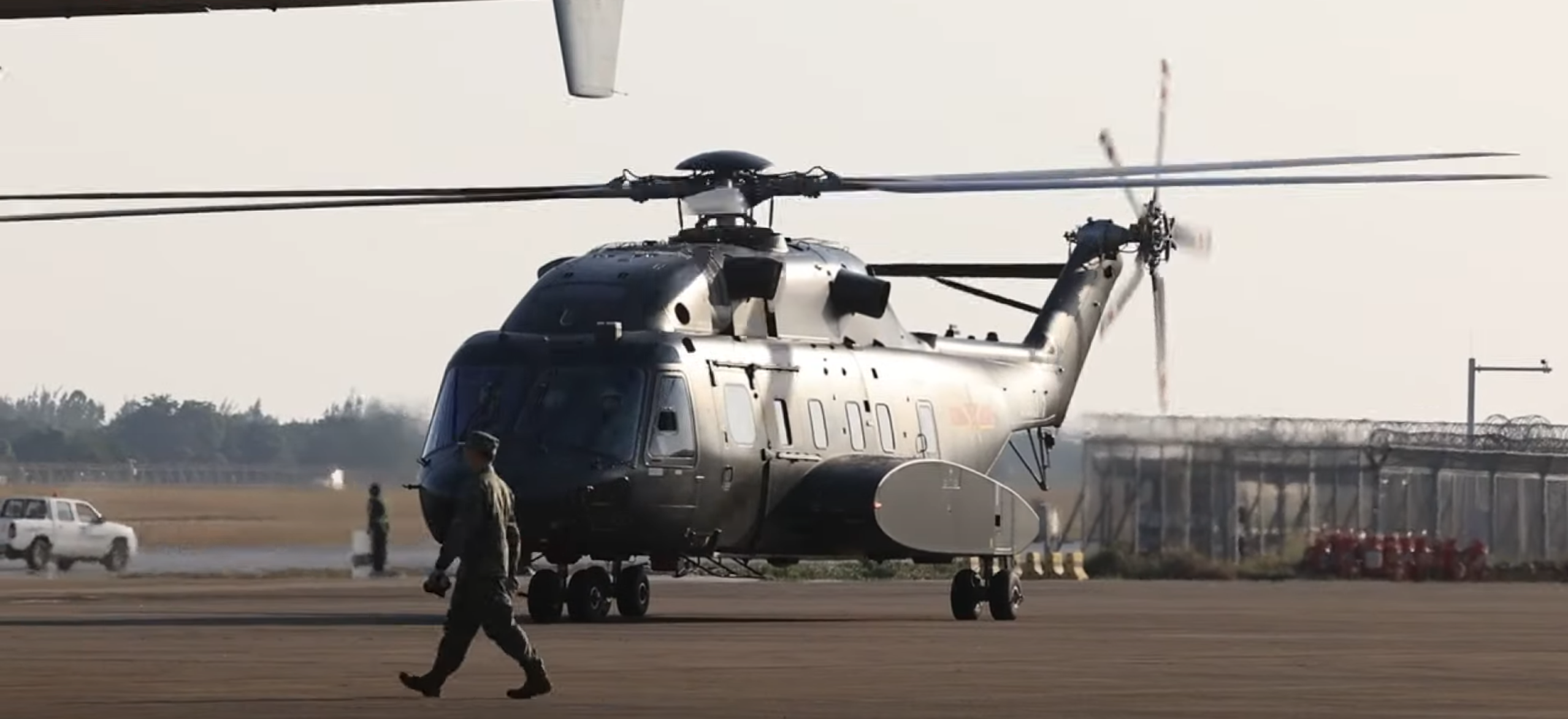
Changhe Z-8L with its widened airframe

Changhe Z-8L
Improved Z-8G with wide-body fuselage and enlarged fuel sponsons, first spotted in January 2019. The internal width of the load area has been increased from 1.8m to 2.4 m, making it larger than old Z-8 and SA321 variants.
Changhe Z-8WJ
People's Armed Police (PAP) variant. Combined elements from the Z-8B and the civilian AC312.
Changhe Z-8WJS
PAP variant with IR camera, better datalink, and ability to carry firefighting bucket.
Changhe Z-8AWJS
People's Armed Police Forestry Corps variant with firefighting capabilities.
Avicopter AC313
Commercial helicopter model derived from the Z-8F.
Avicopter AC313A
Commercial helicopter model derived from the Z-8L
Changhe Z-18
Improved Z-8. A major overhaul of the Z-8F with improved high-altitude flight capability. It can operate at airports on the Tibetan Plateau with a service ceiling above 9,000 m (30,000 ft). Also called Z-8 Major Mods. (Chinese: 直-8大改) and Z-8F-100 during the development.

== Operators ==
China

- People's Liberation Army Naval Air Force: 9 Z-8; 13 Z-8J; 4 Z-8JH; 2 Z-8S.
- People's Liberation Army Ground Force Aviation: 135 Z-8F as of 2025.
- People's Liberation Army Air Force: 18 as of 2024.
- People's Armed Police

== See also ==
Related development

- Aérospatiale SA 321 Super Frelon
- Avicopter AC313
- Changhe Z-18

Aircraft of comparable role, configuration, and era

- Agusta A.101
- AgustaWestland AW101
- Mil Mi-8
- Sikorsky SH-3 Sea King

Related lists

- List of rotorcraft
