= TGV 001 =

French high speed train prototype

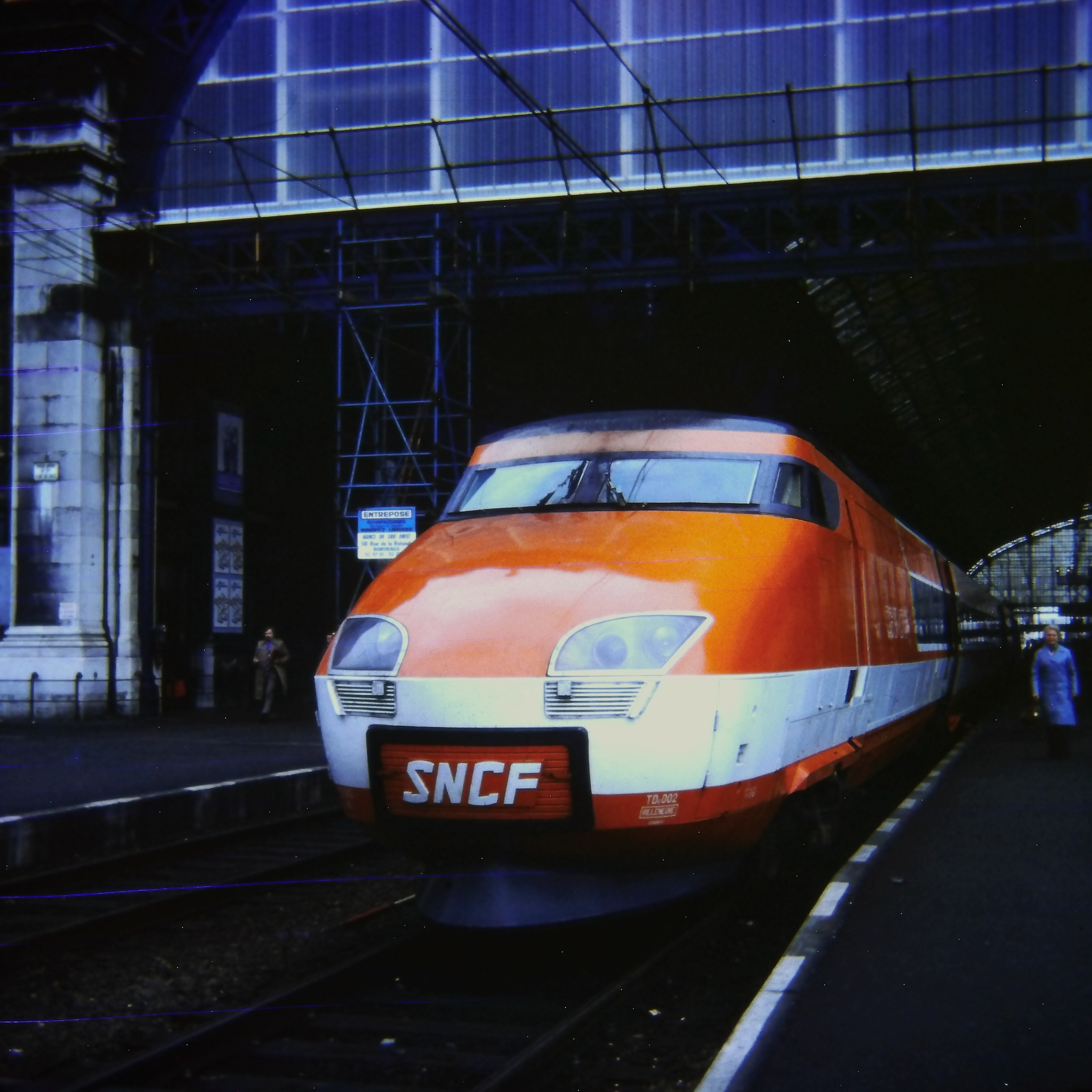
TGV 001 at Bordeaux-Saint-Jean station

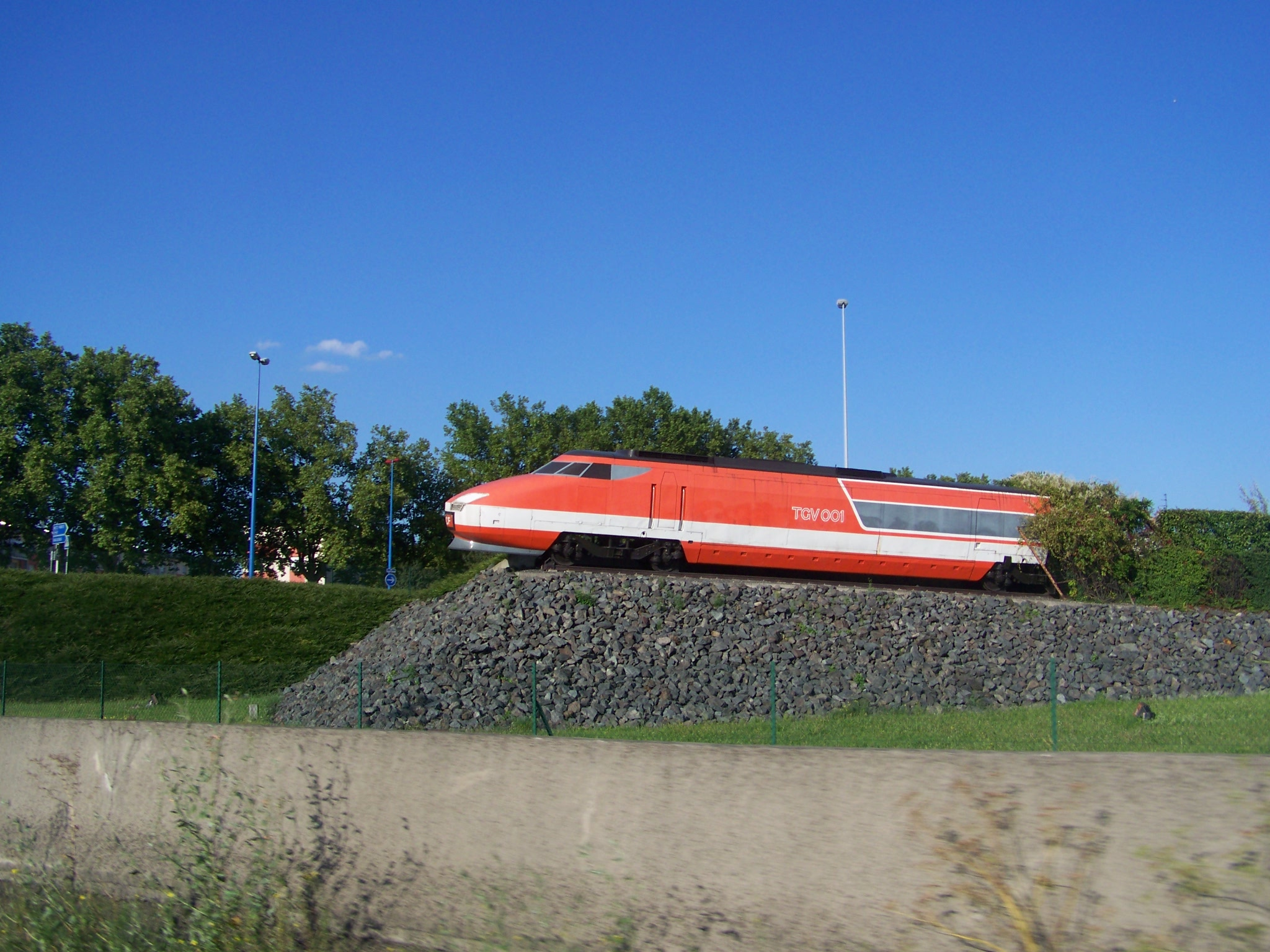
T 001 seen from the A4 motorway in Bischheim.

The TGV 001 (Train à Grande Vitesse 001) is an experimental gas turbine-powered TGV prototype built by Alstom in France. Commissioned in 1969, began testing in 1972 and reached speeds between 250–300 kilometres per hour (160–190 mph). It was part of a vast research program on high rail speeds which covered all technical aspects, principally traction, the behaviour of the vehicles, braking, aerodynamics and signalling. Originally, two trains were to be built, but only one was produced. The second was to be a tilting train equipped with an active tilting system, but was abandoned owing to technical difficulties.

== Description ==
This turbotrain was built in a radically different fashion than its predecessors (the ETG and the RTG); it was composed of two power cars and three carriages, all with driving axles. This concept as well as the shape of the TGV 001 was kept when designing the future TGV.

Each axle was equipped with a traction motor with the advantage of small weight per axle but maximum power. Electric traction permitted dynamic braking, particularly effective at high speeds. Each power car was equipped with two Turbomeca Turmo turbines (TURMO III G then TURMO X), also used in the Super Frelon helicopters. As well as having direct control of the turbines, the power cars were equipped with traction, braking and signalling controls.

The TGV 001 was an articulated train; each carriage shared one bogie with the next. This setup ensured greater stability and permitted the suspension to be placed near the centre of gravity of each carriage, thus reducing rolling in curves.

== Service ==
Despite setting the speed record for a gas turbine-powered locomotive at 318 kilometres per hour (198 mph), this train never saw commercial use.

== History ==
TGV 001 was finished on 24 March 1972 and began to undergo testing on 4 April 1972. It went on to carry out 5,227 test runs, running five hundred thousand kilometres (310,000 mi) and breaking the 300-kilometre-per-hour (190 mph) barrier 175 times.

TGV 001 still holds the world speed record for a gas turbine-electric locomotive, having travelled at 318 kilometres per hour (198 mph) on 8 December 1972.

The 1973 oil crisis caused a sharp increase in the price of oil, after which it was deemed impractical to use oil to power the TGV, and the project turned to electric traction.

Tests officially concluded on 19 June 1978.

== Preservation ==
- T 001: Bischheim (Bas-Rhin) 48.614729°N 7.727189°E
- T 002: Belfort (Territoire de Belfort) 47.643008°N 6.889863°E

== See also ==
- British Rail APT-E
- Gas turbine locomotive#Gas turbine-electric
- SNCF
- Turbotrain
