= Changhe Aircraft Industries Corporation =

Chinese helicopter manufacturer

- Type: Subsidiary
- Industry: Aerospace, defense
- Founded: 1969; 57 years ago
- Headquarters: Jingdezhen, Jiangxi, China
- Key people: Yu Feng (Chairman)
- Products: Military aircraft, helicopters
- Total assets: CN¥4.3 billion
- Number of employees: 4,300
- Parent: Aviation Industry Corporation of China
- Website: www.changhe.com

Changhe Aircraft Industries Corporation (CAIC) (Chinese: 昌河飞机工业(集团)有限责任公司) is a Chinese helicopter manufacturer and supplier to the Chinese military. It is a member of the Aviation Industry Corporation of China (AVIC). The company is based in the city of Jingdezhen in Jiangxi province. Changhe employs 4300 employees in two production facilities with 1.29 million sq. metres and 0.22 million sq. metres of construction area. It has a joint venture with Agusta Helicopter (Jiangxi Changhe-Agusta Helicopter Co., Ltd) and relationship with Sikorsky Aircraft Corporation. Its subsidiary, Changhe Machinery Factory, is a major automobile company in China.

== History ==
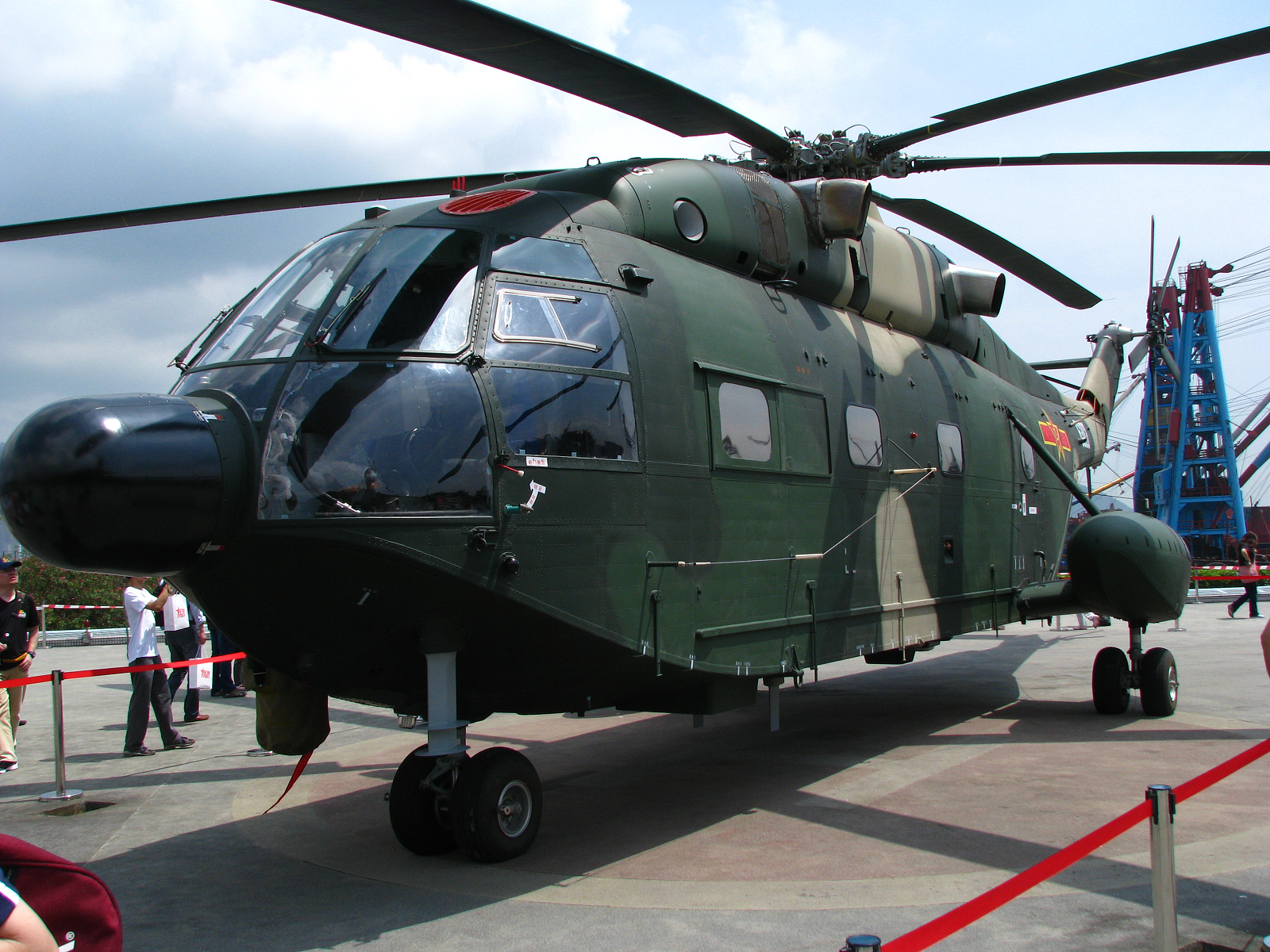
Changhe Z-8

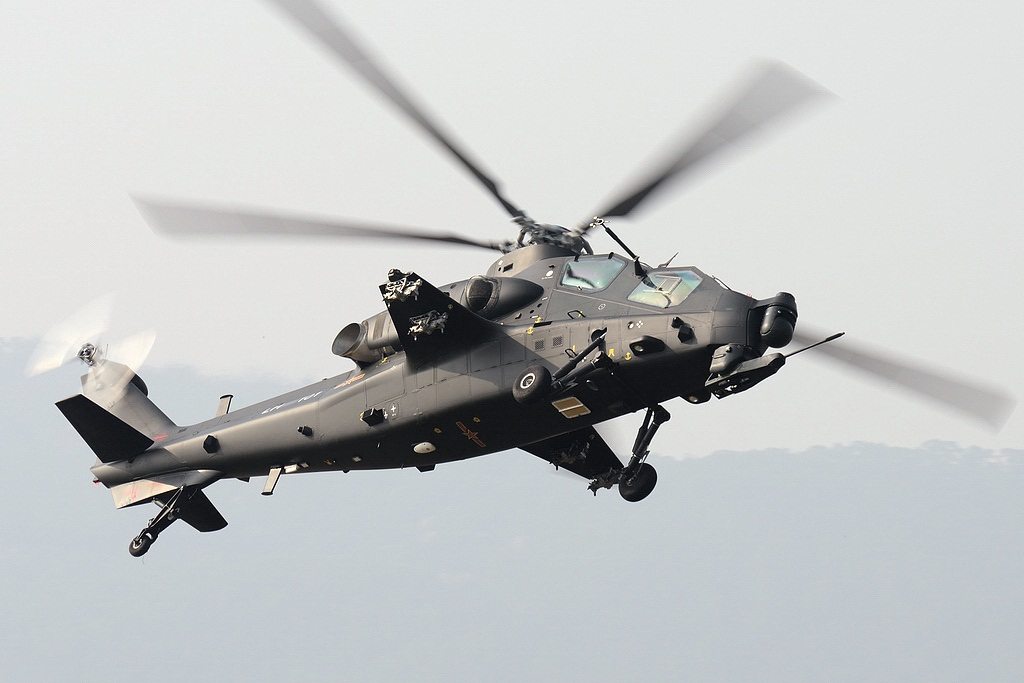
A Changhe Z-10 at 2012 Zhuhai Airshow

The company was established in 1969 as a state enterprise and now as a contractor to the People's Liberation Army.

== Products ==
Helicopters

- Changhe Z-10 - attack helicopter currently in production; it is built to replace Z-9W
- Changhe Z-8 - naval and Z-8A army heavy transport helicopter; Chinese variant of SA321Ja Super Frelon
- Changhe CA109 - utility helicopter; Chinese version of A109
- Changhe Z-11 - light military utility helicopter
- Changhe Z-18- a replacement for the Z-8 Super Frelon

Parts

- Tail rotor pylon for the Sikorsky S-92
- Fuselage for the Sikorsky S-76

== See also ==
- Aviation Industry Corporation of China (AVIC)
- ACAC consortium
- Chengdu Aircraft Industry Group
- Guizhou Aircraft Industry Co.
- Harbin Aircraft Manufacturing Corporation
- Hongdu Aviation Industry Corporation
- Shaanxi Aircraft Company
- Shanghai Aviation Industrial Company
- Shenyang Aircraft Corporation
- Xi'an Aircraft Industrial Corporation
