= SNCASE SE.3200 Frelon =

French helicopter built in the late 1950s

SE.3200 Frelon

General information
- Type: Military transport helicopter
- National origin: France
- Manufacturer: SNCASE; Sud Aviation
- Number built: 2

History
- First flight: 10 June 1959
- Developed into: Aérospatiale SA 321 Super Frelon

The SNCASE SE.3200 Frelon (Hornet) is a French helicopter built in the late 1950s. Intended to serve as a multirole helicopter for the French Army, Air Forces and Navy, two prototypes were built and flown before the project was replaced by the SA 321 Super Frelon.

== Design and development ==
The SNCASE SE.3200 Frelon was a heavy helicopter designed to equip the French Armed Forces, replacing the Sikorsky S-58 built under license by then SNCASE (Société Nationale de Construction Aéronautique Southeast).

The specifications called for an aircraft of less than 5 tonnes gross weight. The prototypes were powered by three Turbomeca Turmo IIIB 750 hp turbines to avoid all risk of engine failure: production aircraft were to have used the 1000hp Turmo IIC. The engines drove a single four blade rotor. SE 3200 Frelon presenting with a fuselage rather short on the sides with two fuel tanks a capacity of 1100 liters each offering the opportunity to be drop with the tip back, swivel, should facilitate the loading of light vehicles. The Frelon was able to carry light vehicles or 24 fully-equipped troops or 15 stretchers and two attendants if used as an air ambulance. It was equipped with a fixed tricycle landing gear.

Only two prototypes were built, the first one flying on 10 June 1959 at Paris – Le Bourget Airport.

== Specifications ==
Data from

General characteristics

- Length: 15.19 m (49 ft 10 in) with rotor folded
- Empty weight: 4,500 kg (9,920 lb)
- Gross weight: 7,498 kg (16,530 lb)
- Max takeoff weight: 8,001 kg (17,640 lb)
- Powerplant: 3 × Turbomeca Turmo IIIB , 520 kW (700 hp) each
- Main rotor diameter: 14.99 m (49 ft 2 in)

Performance

- Maximum speed: 246 km/h (153 mph, 133 kn)
- Cruise speed: 232 km/h (144 mph, 125 kn)
- Ferry range: 1,300 km (810 mi, 700 nmi)
- Service ceiling: 4,700 m (15,400 ft) at all-up weight of 5647 kg (12,450 lbs)

== See also ==
Related development

- Aérospatiale SA 321 Super Frelon

Aircraft of comparable role, configuration, and era

- Agusta A.101

Related lists

- List of helicopters
