= Agusta A.101 =

Italian helicopter prototype, 1960s-1971

A.101
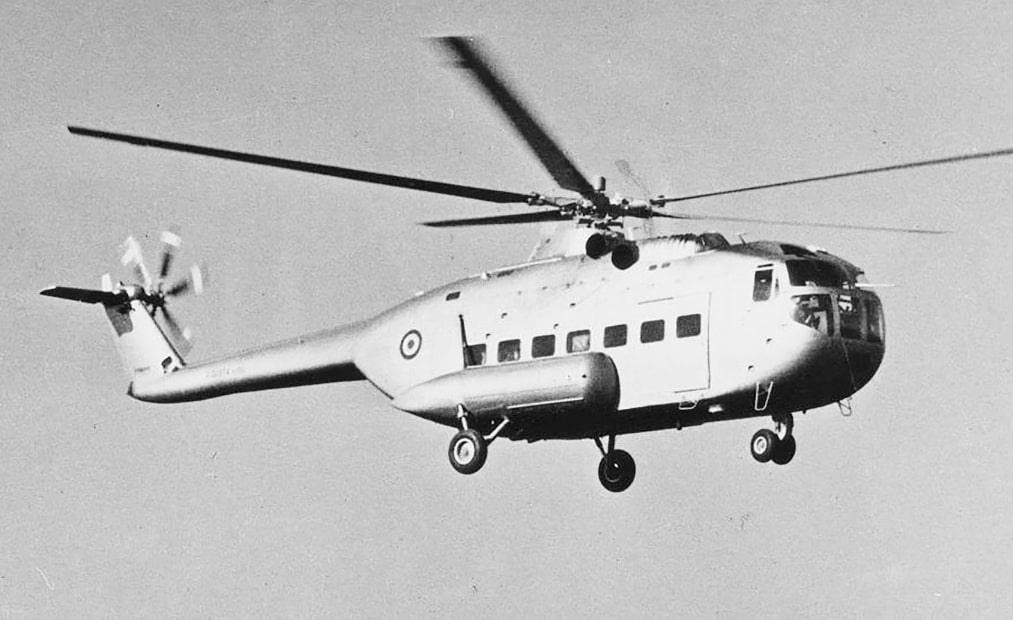
- A.101 helicopter in flight

General information
- Type: Transport helicopter
- Manufacturer: Agusta
- Designer: Filippo Zappata
- Number built: 1

History
- First flight: 19 October 1964

The Agusta A.101 (originally designated AZ.101) was a large prototype transport helicopter developed and produced by the Italian rotorcraft manufacturer Agusta.

Work on the A.101 started during the early 1960s. The prototype performed its maiden flight on 19 October 1964. Despite prospective orders from the Italian armed forces, no buyers emerged for the type after the Italian government opted for the Sikorsky SH-3 Sea King licensed to Agusta instead. Accordingly, the project was abandoned in 1971. The prototype is currently in storage at the Museo Agusta.

== Design and development ==
The A.101 was of conventional, single-rotor configuration with a tricycle undercarriage and powered by triple turboshaft engines. The fuselage was provided with a rear loading ramp and two large sliding troop doors. On 19 October 1964, the prototype A.101 performed its maiden flight.

The final stage in the A.101's development was to stretch the fuselage by 3 m (10 ft) and upgrade the engines to the more powerful General Electric T58. This resulted in a marked improvement in performance, but in the end, the Italian government opted for licence-built variants of the American Sikorsky SH-3 Sea King, which would be produced by Agusta in place of their indigenous design. Having not secured any orders for the A.101, the company decided against proceeding with quantity production of the type.

The single prototype is stored for preservation at the Museo Agusta at Cascina Costa.

== Variants ==
A.101D
The original concept by Filippo Zappata exhibited in model form at the Milan Trade Fair in April 1958, also designated AZ.101, acknowledging Zappata's role in the design process. Power was to have been supplied by three 750 hp (559 kW) Turbomeca Turmo engines.
A.101G
The sole prototype powered by three 1,400 hp (1,044 kW) Rolls-Royce Gnome H.1400 turboshaft engines
A.101H
A projected up-rated version, stretched by 3 m (10 ft), with tricycle undercarriage and powered by three General Electric T58 turboshaft engines.

== Specifications (A.101G configuration) ==
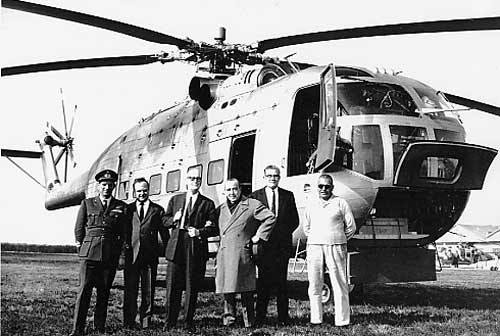
A.101 helicopter in 1964. Third from right is Count Domenico Agusta and fourth is Filippo Zappata

Data from Jane's All The World's Aircraft 1969–70

General characteristics

- Crew: 2
- Capacity: up to 36 passengers / 18 stretchers with five attendants / 5,000 kg (11,000 lb) payload
- Length: 20.19 m (66 ft 3 in) including tail rotor
- Width: 4.64 m (15 ft 3 in) with rotor blades folded
- Height: 6.56 m (21 ft 6 in) to top of rotor head
- Empty weight: 6,850 kg (15,102 lb)
- Gross weight: 12,400 kg (27,337 lb)
- Max takeoff weight: 12,900 kg (28,440 lb)
- Fuel capacity: 2,000 L (530 US gal; 440 imp gal) in fuselage side fairings
- Powerplant: 3 × de Havilland H.1400 Gnome turboshaft engines, 1,000 kW (1,400 shp) each for take-off

1,250 shp (930 kW) maximum continuous

- Main rotor diameter: 20.4 m (66 ft 11 in)

Performance

- Maximum speed: 217 km/h (135 mph, 117 kn) at MTOW
- Cruise speed: 201 km/h (125 mph, 109 kn) at MTOW
- Range: 378 km (235 mi, 204 nmi) at MTOW
- Service ceiling: 2,950 m (9,680 ft) at MTOW
- Hover ceiling IGE: 1,400 m (4,600 ft) at MTOW
- Hover ceiling OGE: 600 m (1,970 ft) at MTOW
- Rate of climb: 9.7 m/s (1,910 ft/min) at MTOW

Avionics
VFR and IFR instrumentation with provision for autostab and autopilot

== See also ==
- AgustaWestland AW101

Aircraft of comparable role, configuration, and era

- SNCASE SE.3200 Frelon
