= CA109 =

CA109 may refer to:

- A variant of the AgustaWestland AW109E for China
- California State Route 109, a highway in the US state of California
- Caldwell 109, a star cluster
