= Turbomeca Turmo =

Family of turboshaft engines

Turmo
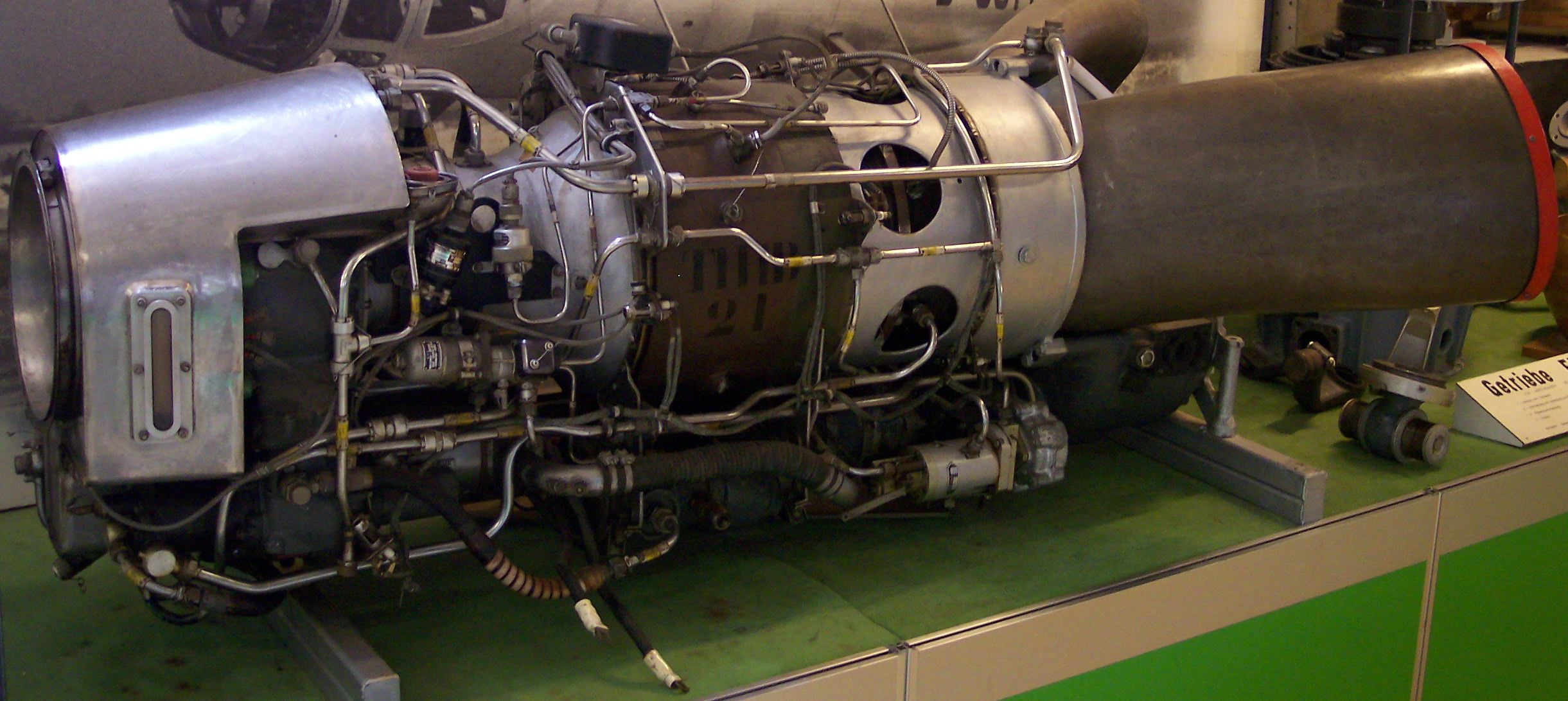
- Turbomeca Turmo IIIB
- Type: Turboshaft/turboprop
- National origin: France
- Manufacturer: Turbomeca
- Major applications: Aérospatiale SA 321 Super Frelon; Aérospatiale SA 330 Puma; Bréguet 941
- Developed into: Bristol Siddeley Nimbus

The Turbomeca Turmo is a family of French turboshaft engines manufactured for helicopter use. Developed from the earlier Turbomeca Artouste, later versions delivered up to 1,300 kW (1,700 shp). A turboprop version was developed for use with the Bréguet 941 transport aircraft.

Current versions are built in partnership with Rolls-Royce, and the engine is produced under licence by the Chinese Changzhou Lan Xiang Machinery Works as the WZ-6 and Romanian Turbomecanica, Bucharest, as the Turmo IV-CA.

== Design and development ==
The Turmo was initially developed with a single-stage centrifugal compressor, annular combustion chamber and single stage turbine. Power output was from a single-stage free power turbine and was initially 200 kW (270 hp).

During early post-war helicopter development, the use of cold and hot rotor tip-jets was widely investigated. To provide large mass-flow air for efficient operation of the tip-jets, Turbomeca developed a gas turbine driven gas producer, powered by the free power-turbine of the Turmo to deliver the required gas flow.

== Variants ==
Data from:-Jane's all the World's Aircraft 1957–58

Turmo I
The initial version of the Turmo; max continuous gearbox output 200 kW (270 shp) at 3,000 rpm, at 33,750 rpm gas generator speed.
Turmo II
Developed version of the Turmo I; max continuous gearbox output 240 kW (320 shp) at 34,000 rpm gas generator speed.
Turmo III
With 2-stage free power-turbine, pressure ratio 5.7:1; Maximum shaft output 560 kW (750 shp), max continuous 450 kW (600 shp) at 33,400 rpm
Turmo IIIB
Turmo IIIC
A 890 kW (1,200 hp) turboshaft powering the Sud-Aviation Frelon prototypes.
Turmo IIIC_{2}
Developed from the IIIC delivering 970 kW (1,300 hp) maximum output
Turmo IIIC_{3}
Maximum rating 1,100 kW (1,500 hp) at 33,500 rpm for production Super Frelon helicopters
Turmo IIIC_{4}
Military variant.
Turmo IIIC_{5}
Turmo IIIC_{6}
Turmo IIIC_{7}
Turmo IIID
Turboprop for the proposed Breguet Br 942 STOL transport, maximum rating 913 kW (1,225 hp).
Turmo IIID_{2}
996 kW (1,335 hp) at 22,460 free turbine rpm
Turmo IIID_{3}
1,080 kW (1,450 hp) at 33,500 rpm
Turmo IIIF
1,150 hp (860 kW) at 32,100 rpm for use on Turbotrain and Turboliner
Turmo IVB
Military Variant
Turmo IVC
Civil Variant
Turmo IV-CA
Licence production in Romania
Turmo VI
Turboprop engine with two axial stages, one centrifugal compressor stage and two free power turbine stages, rated at 1,300 kW (1,800 hp) at 32,000 rpm.
Turmo XII
1,600 hp (1,200 kW) for use on Class T 2000 Turbotrain and TGV 001.
WZ-6
Licence production at the Changzhou Lan Xiang Machinery Works in the People's Republic of China.

== Applications ==
Turboshaft

- Sud-Est SE.3140 Alouette II
- Aérospatiale SA 321 Super Frelon
- Aérospatiale SA 330 Puma
- Bölkow Bo 46
- IAR 330
- SNCASE SE.3200 Frelon
- N.300 Naviplane

Turboprop

- Breguet Br 940 Integral
- Bréguet 941
- Breguet 941S

Automobile

- Renault Étoile Filante

Train

- Turbotrain
- SNCF Class T 2000
- Turboliner
- TGV 001

== Specifications (Turmo IIIC_{7}) ==
Data from Flight International.

==== General characteristics ====
- Type: Two-shaft turboshaft
- Length: 182 cm (71.65 in)
- Diameter: 71.6 cm (28.19 in)
- Dry weight: 325 kg (717 lb)

==== Components ====
- Compressor: Single-stage axial, single-stage centrifugal
- Combustors: Annular, reverse-flow
- Turbine: Two-stage compressor turbine, two-stage power turbine

==== Performance ====
- Maximum power output: 1,217 kW (1,632 hp)
- Overall pressure ratio: 5.9:1
- Air mass flow: 6.2 kg/s (820 lb/min)
- Power-to-weight ratio: 3.74 kW/kg (2.27 hp/lb)

== See also ==
Related development

- Turbomeca Turmo I

Related lists

- List of aircraft engines
