= Aérospatiale SA 321 Super Frelon =

1962 transport helicopter family

SA 321 Super Frelon
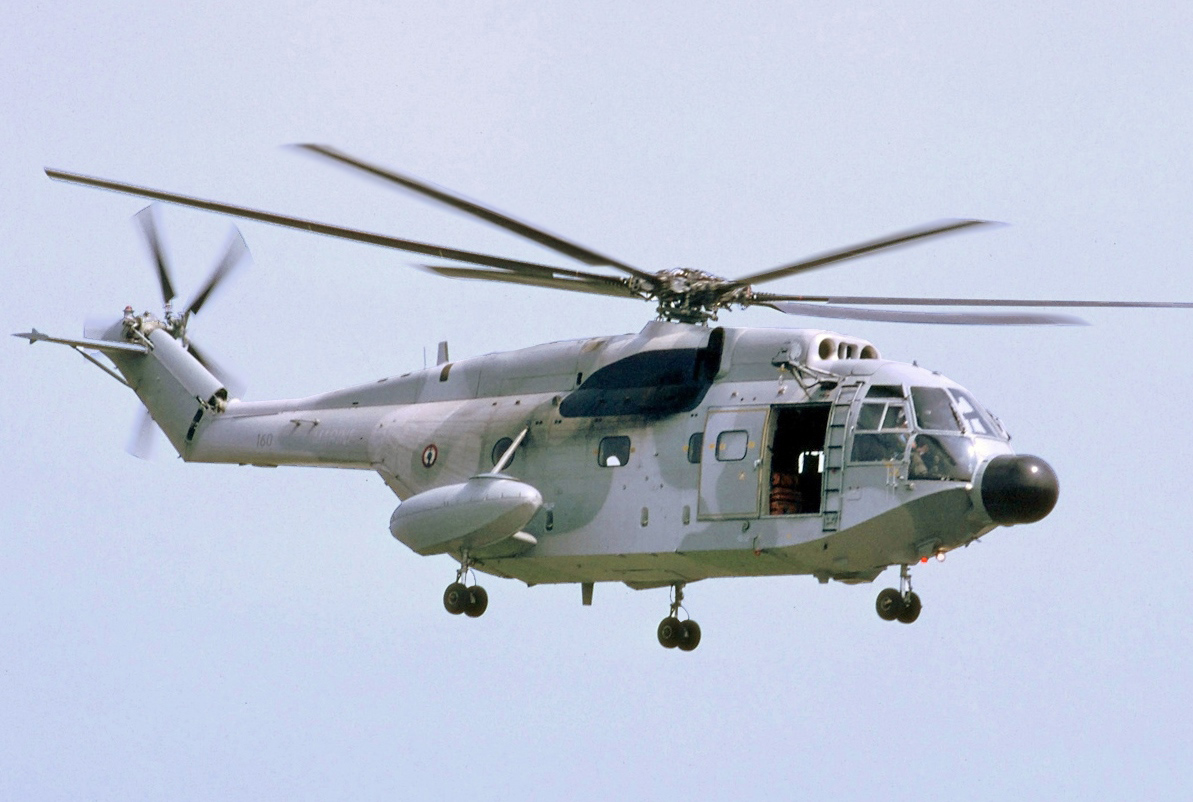
- A Super Frelon helicopter of the French Navy

General information
- Type: Transport helicopter
- National origin: France
- Manufacturer: Sud Aviation; Aérospatiale
- Status: In service with the People's Liberation Army Naval Air Force
- Primary users: French Navy People's Liberation Army Air Force; South African Air Force; Iraqi Air Force
- Number built: 110

History
- Manufactured: 1962–1981
- Introduction date: 1966
- First flight: 7 December 1962
- Developed from: SNCASE SE.3200 Frelon
- Developed into: Changhe Z-8

The Aérospatiale (formerly Sud Aviation) SA 321 Super Frelon ("Super Hornet") is a three-engined heavy transport helicopter produced by aerospace manufacturer Sud Aviation of France. It held the distinction of being the most powerful helicopter to be built in Europe at one point, as well as being the world's fastest helicopter.

The Super Frelon was a more powerful development of the original SE.3200 Frelon, which had failed to enter production. On 7 December 1962, the first prototype conducted the type's maiden flight. On 23 July 1963, a modified Super Frelon flew a record-breaking flight, setting the new FAI absolute helicopter world speed record with a recorded speed of 217.7 mph (350.4 km/h). Both civilian and military versions of the Super Frelon were produced; the type was predominantly sold to military customers. In 1981, Aerospatiale, Sud Aviation's successor company, chose to terminate production due to a lack of orders.

The Super Frelon was most heavily used by naval air arms, such as the French Naval Aviation and the People's Liberation Army Naval Air Force. On 30 April 2010, the type was retired by the French Navy, having been replaced by a pair of Eurocopter EC225 helicopters as a stopgap measure pending the availability of the NHIndustries NH90 helicopter. The Super Frelon was in use for an extended period within China, where it was manufactured under license and sold by the Harbin Aircraft Industry Group as the Changhe Z-8. A modernised derivative of the Z-8, marketed as the Avicopter AC313, performed its first flight on 18 March 2010.

== Development ==
=== Background ===
The SA.3210 Super Frelon was developed by French aerospace company Sud Aviation from the original SE.3200 Frelon. During the type's development, Sud Aviation had risen to prominence as a major helicopter manufacturer, having exported more rotorcraft than any other European rival. Having produced the popular Aérospatiale Alouette II and Aérospatiale Alouette III, the firm was keen to establish a range of helicopters fulfilling various roles, functions, and size requirements; two of the larger models in development by the early 1960s were the Super Frelon and what would become the Aérospatiale SA 330 Puma. The Super Frelon was the largest helicopter in development by the firm, being substantially increased over the earlier Frelon, and was considered to be an ambitious design at the time.

The earlier Frelon had been developed to meet the requirements of both the French Navy and the German Navy, which both had released details on its anticipated demands for a heavy helicopter; however, these requirements were revised upwards by the customer, leading to the redesign and emergence of the Super Frelon. Changes included the adoption of much more powerful engines, using three Turbomeca Turmo IIIC turboshaft engines, each capable of generating 1,320 shp (980 kW) on the prototypes (later uprated to 1,500 shp (1,100 kW) on production models) in place of the Frelon's 750 / 800 shp (560 / 600 kW) Turbomeca Turmo IIIB engines; these drove a 62 ft (19 m) six-bladed main rotor, instead of the Frelon's 50 ft (15 m) four-bladed one, and a five-bladed (instead of four-bladed) tail rotor. Overall, the modified design provided for a greatly increased gross weight, from 17,650 to 26,450 lb (8,010 to 12,000 kg), whilst improving the rotorcraft's aerodynamic efficiency and handling qualities.

Additional external changes between the Frelon and Super Frelon had been made, such as the original stubby tail boom having been replaced by a more conventional one, albeit with a crank in it to raise the tail rotor clear of vehicles approaching the rear loading ramp. Taking note of American experiments with amphibious helicopters, the Super Frelon's fuselage was redesigned into a hull, featuring a bow, planing bottom and watertight bilge compartments. Various foreign manufacturers participated in the development and manufacturing of the type; American helicopter company Sikorsky was contracted to supply the design of a new six-bladed main rotor and five-bladed tail rotor, while Italian manufacturer Fiat supplied the design for a new main transmission.

=== Into flight ===
On 7 December 1962, the first prototype Super Frelon conducted the type's maiden flight. On 28 May 1963, it was followed by the second prototype. The first prototype was tailored towards meeting the needs of the French Air Force, while the second was fully navalised, including lateral stabilising floats fixed to the undercarriage. On 23 July 1963, a modified prototype Super Frelon helicopter was used to break the FAI absolute helicopter world speed record, having attained a maximum speed of 217.7 mph (350.4 km/h) during the flight. Flown by Jean Boulet and Roland Coffignot, a total of three international records were broken, these being: speed over 3 km at low altitude, 212.03 mph (341.23 km/h); speed at any altitude over 15 and 25 km, 217.77 mph (350.47 km/h); and 100 km closed circuit 207.71 mph (334.28 km/h).

By April 1964, the two prototypes had accumulated 388 flying hours, which included 30 hours of seaworthiness trials performed with the second prototype. In January 1964, the third Super Frelon prototype made its first flight, the fourth first flew during May 1964, and a pair of pre-production models were completed during the latter half of 1964. The third prototype participated in a series of accelerated wear trials to establish component endurance and overhaul lifespan, while the fourth prototype was assigned to further tests of equipment for the naval environment.

By July 1964, the French Government had placed an initial order for the Super Frelon, intended to perform logistic support duties at the Centre Experimental du Pacifique; negotiations for a further order was already being negotiated for the naval version, which were to be equipped for anti-submarine duties. However, West German support for the Super Frelon programme had already declined by this point, partially due to interest in the rival Sikorsky SH-3 Sea King, which was evaluated against the type.

Both civilian and military versions of the Super Frelon were built, with the military variants being the most numerous by far, entering service with the French military as well as being exported to Israel, South Africa, Libya, China and Iraq. Three military variants were produced: military transport, anti-submarine and anti-ship. The transport version is able to carry 27 equipped troops, or alternatively 15 stretchers for casualty evacuation tasks.

== Design ==
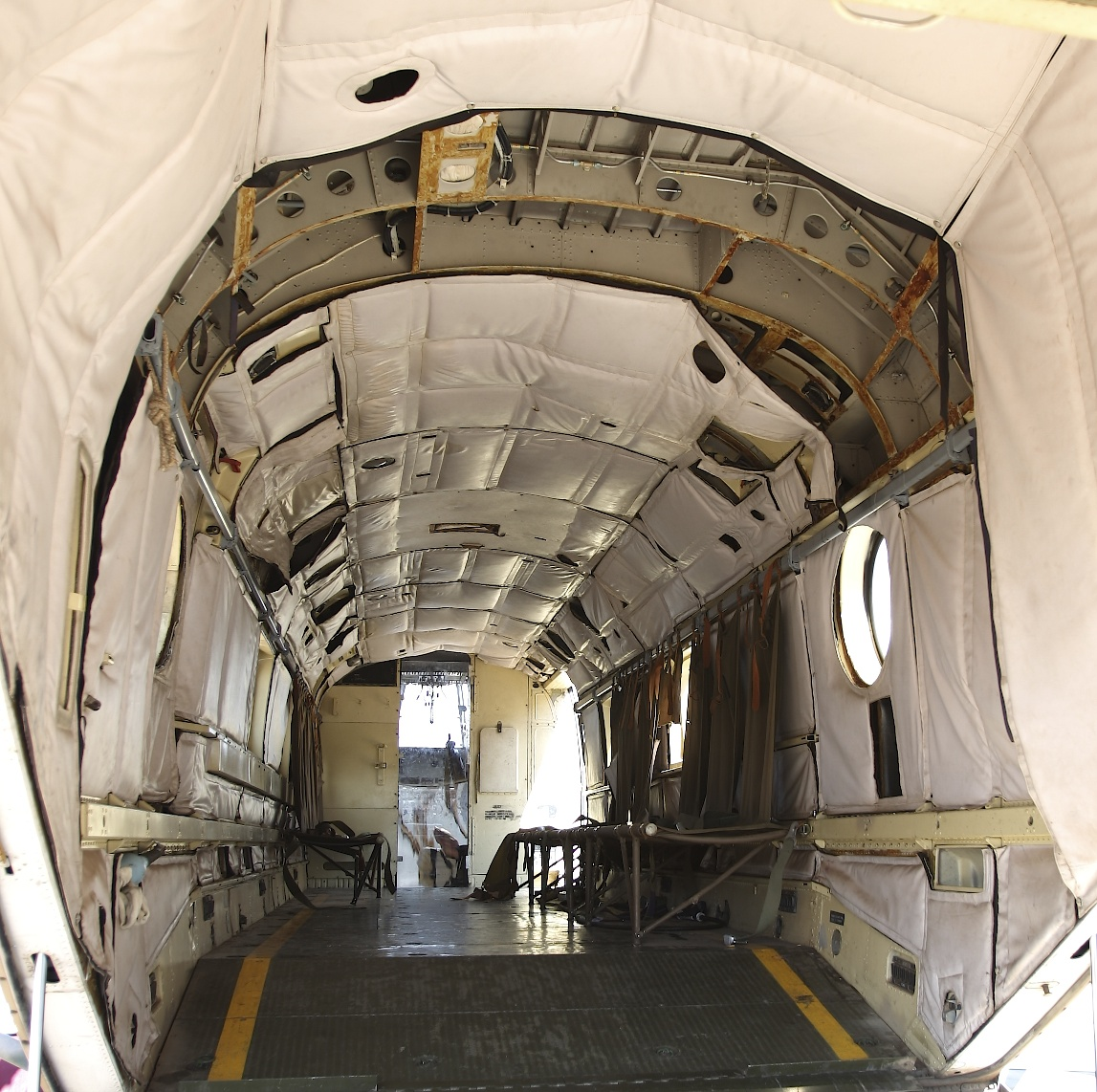
The load deck of a Super Frelon

The Aérospatiale SA 321 Super Frelon is a large, heavy-lift single-rotor helicopter, furnished with a relatively atypical three-engine configuration; these are Turboméca Turmo IIIC turboshaft engines set on top of the fuselage, a pair of turbines positioned side by side at the front and one located aft of the main rotor. The naval anti-submarine and anti-ship variants are usually equipped with navigation and search radar (ORB-42), and a 50-metre rescue cable. They are most often fitted with a 20 mm cannon, countermeasures, night vision, a laser designator and a Personal Locator System. The Super Frelon can also be fitted for inflight refueling.

The front engines have simple individual ram intakes, while the rear one is fitted with a semi-circular scoop to provide air; all three bifurcated exhausts are near to the rotor head. The three engines and the reduction gearbox are mounted on a horizontal bulkhead and firewall, which forms the roof of the cabin and upper structural member of the fuselage. The engines are isolated by multiple firewalls, including transverse firewalls separating front and rear engines from the rotor gearbox, and zonal engine firewalls. Eight sturdy hinged doors provide access to the compact Turmo engines, which have ample space around them to enable ground crew to service them without using external platforms.

The fuselage is actually a hull, which makes use of a semi-monocoque light alloy construction; according to aerospace publication Flight International, the hull design was "reminiscent of flying-boat engineering". The main cabin lacks any transverse bracing, except for a single bulkhead between the cockpit and cabin. Substantial built-up frames connect the strengthened roof structure with the floor/planing-bottom of transverse under-floor bulkheads and outer skin. A conventional exterior skin is used, employing longitudinal stiffeners as well as two lines of deep channel members, while the under-floor cross members are reinforced with vertical stiffeners. There is no keel at the floor level; there are horizontal members between frames, which are stiffened by transverse shear angles. Flexible fuel cells are stored in four watertight under-floor compartments lying fore and aft of the rotor axis, while the floor itself is fitted with removable panels. A hatch set into the floor, positioned approximately underneath the rotor axis, is used for sling-load operations.

At the rear of the cabin is a tapered section of simple semi-monocoque construction, which is closed by a robust hinged rear loading ramp, which serves as the main entrance for bulky loads or equipment. The loading ramp is jettisonable in emergency situations. Additionally, there is a sliding door located on the forward starboard side, while a small hinged emergency door is set on the aft port side. The tail boom uses conventional semi-monocoque construction, supported by closely spaced notched channel-section frames and continuous stringers, absent of any major longitudinal sections or longerons. The cranked section carrying the tail rotor and trim plane is more robust, strengthened by a solid-web spar, frames, and stiffeners. The juncture of the main boom and cranked section is hinged in order to reduce the rotorcraft's folded length to 58 ft (18 m). Along the top of the boom, the shaft for the tail rotor is covered by a fairing.

The fixed landing gear has twin wheels on each of the three vertical shock absorber-equipped struts. The main leading gear units are mounted on triangulated tubular structures, while the nose gear is bracketed to the cockpit bulkhead via a watertight seal in the planing bottom. The main wheels have hydraulic brakes operated from the pedals, complete with a parking hand brake, while the nose unit is fully castoring. The nose, which is covered by large glazed panels, has a bow chine and planing bottom built as a unit with the flight deck, which is higher than the main cabin floor.

== Operational history ==
=== China ===
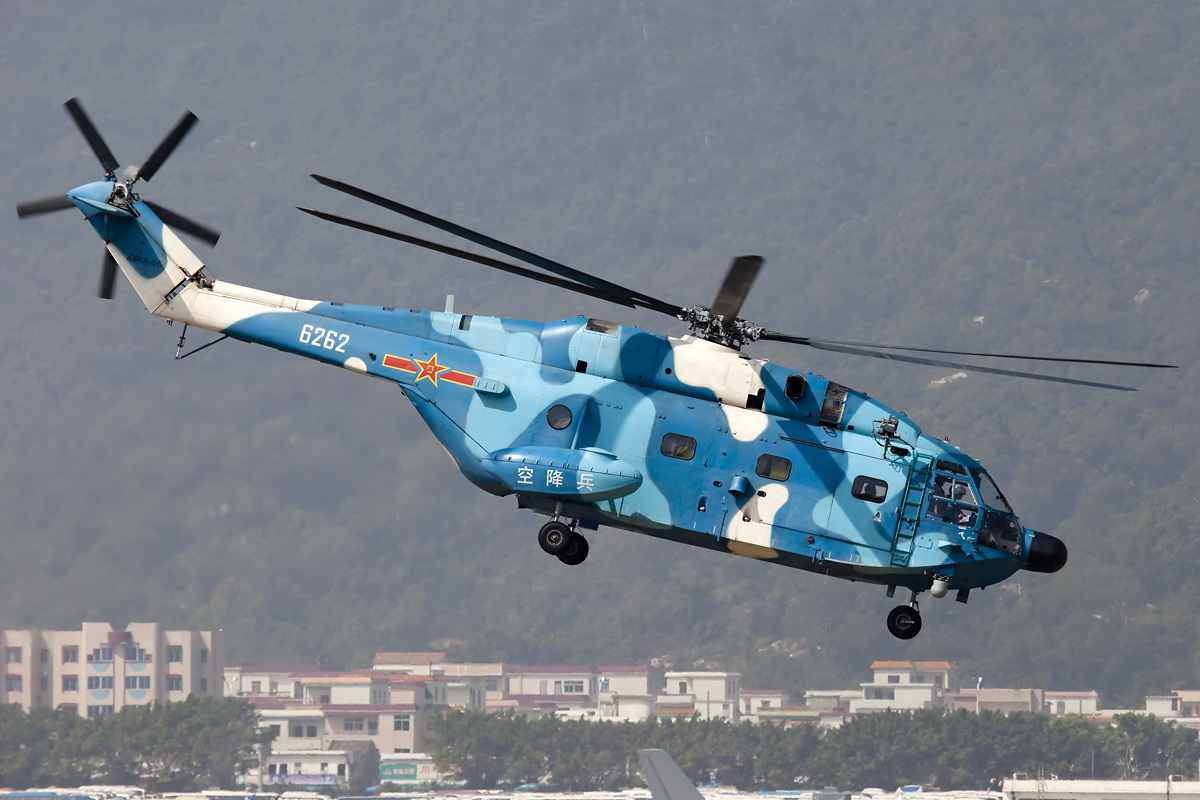
PLAAF Z-8K

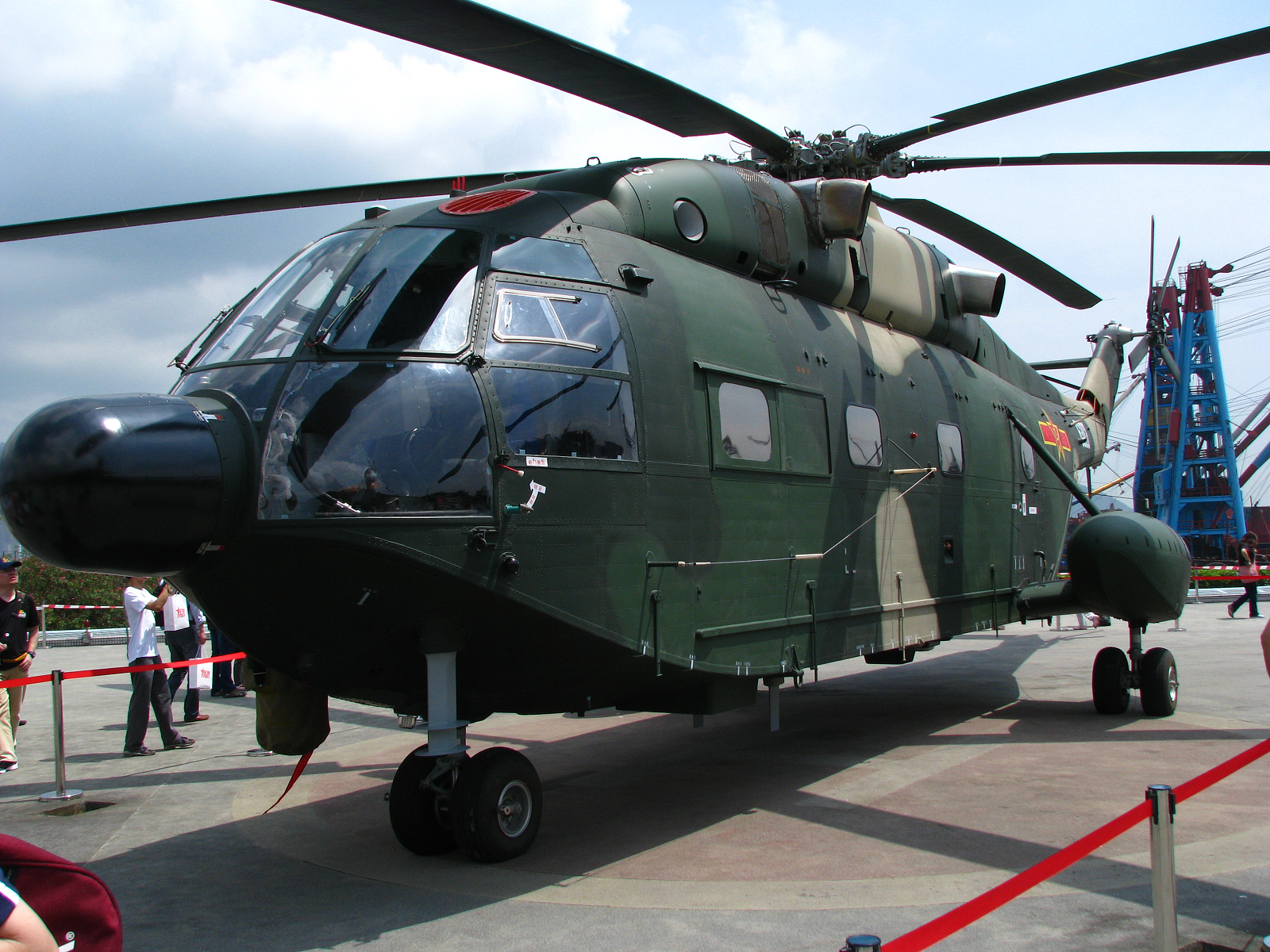
A PLAAF Z-8KH

From December 1975 to April 1977, China took delivery of a batch of 12 SA 321 Super Frelon navalised helicopters. These helicopters came in two variants: anti-submarine warfare (ASW) and search and rescue (SAR) versions. The Super Frelon was the first helicopter of the People's Liberation Army (PLA) to be capable of operating from the flight deck of surface vessels.

China began the localized production of the Super Frelons under license with the help of France in 1976, where it is known under the designation Changhe Z-8. On 11 December 1985, the first Chinese-produced Z-8 took its maiden flight, and the second prototype took flight in October 1987. The Z-8 was delivered to the PLA Naval Aviation for trials and used for mine clearance, minelaying, and anti-Submarine Warfare with the initial production beginning in the same year. On 12 November 1994, the Z-8 was officially certified.

China has also developed a domestic civil helicopter variant of the Z-8, which is marketed as the Avicopter AC313. The AC313 has a maximum takeoff weight of 13.8 tonnes, is capable of carrying up to 27 passengers, and has a maximum range of 900 km (559 miles).

After the 2008 Sichuan earthquake, Z-8 helicopter production received a massive boost as the event had proved the helicopter's value in humanitarian missions. New engine acquisition and design changes were implemented in order to iron out some of the known issues that had affected the Z-8 for decades. The Chinese People's Armed Police ordered 18 Z-8 helicopters; by 2013, at least five helicopters had been delivered, the majority of these having been assigned to forestry firefighting units. During subsequent earthquake relief operations, Z-8 helicopters have been deployed to perform rescue and logistical missions.

=== France ===
In October 1965, the SA 321G ASW helicopter joined the French Naval Aviation (Aeronavale). Apart from ship-based ASW missions, the SA321G also carried out sanitisation patrols in support of Redoutable-class ballistic missile submarines. Some aircraft were modified with nose-mounted targeting radar for Exocet anti-ship missiles. Five SA321GA freighters, originally used in support of the Pacific nuclear test centre, were transferred to assault support duties.

In 2003, the surviving Aeronavale Super Frelons were assigned to transport duties, including commando transport, VertRep, and SAR.

The SA321G Super Frelon served with Flotille 32F of the French Aviation navale, operating from Lanvéoc-Poulmic in Brittany in the Search and Rescue role. They were retired on 30 April 2010, replaced by two Eurocopter EC225 helicopters purchased as stop-gaps until the NHIndustries NH90 came into service in 2011–12.

=== Iraq ===
Starting in 1977, a total of 16 Super Frelons were delivered to the Iraqi Air Force; equipped with radar and Exocet missiles, the Iraqi models were designated as the SA 321H. These rotorcraft were deployed in the lengthy Iran–Iraq War and during the 1991 Gulf War, in which at least one example was destroyed.

During the Iran–Iraq War, Iraq started using Super Frelon and its other newly purchased Exocet-equipped fighters to target Iranian shipping in Persian Gulf in an event now known as the Tanker War. Two of the Iraqi Super Frelons were downed by Iranian fighters, one by a long-range shot of AIM-54A Phoenix by an F-14 Tomcat (during Operation Pearl) while under way over Persian Gulf, and one by an AGM-65A Maverick fired from an Iranian F-4 Phantom in July 1986, while attempting to take off from an oil rig.

=== Israel ===
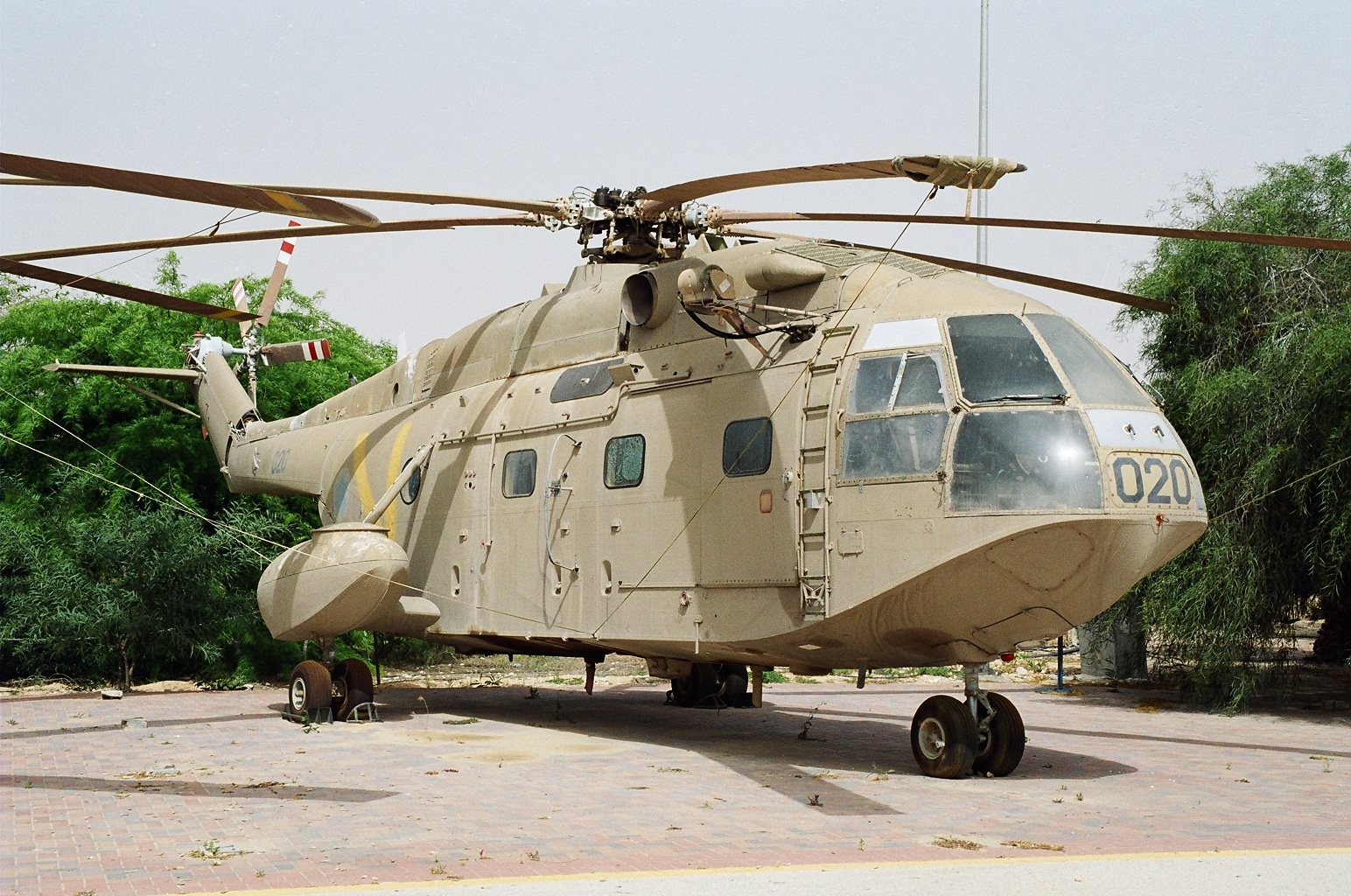
An Israeli Air Force Super Frelon at the Air Force Museum in Hatzerim

Israel placed an order for six SA 321K Super Frelons in 1965 to equip the Israeli Air Force with a heavy lift transport capability. The first of these helicopters arrived on 20 April 1966, enabling the inauguration of 114 Squadron, which operated the type out of Tel Nof. An additional six Super Frelons were ordered during the following year.

The Israeli military had initially hoped to use the Super Frelons for deploying Panhard AML-90 light armoured cars in support of airborne operations, but this concept was dropped when tests revealed the helicopter was incapable of handling the vehicle's combat weight. A total of four helicopters had arrived by the start of the 1967 Six-Day War, during which they flew 41 sorties. Israeli Super Frelons saw extensive service during the War of Attrition, participating in operations such as Helem, Tarnegol 53 and Rhodes.

The type was once again in service during the Yom Kippur War, following which Israel replaced the original Turbomeca Turmo engines with the 1,390 kW (1,870 shp) General Electric T58-GE-T5D engine. The Super Frelons also took part in the Israeli invasion of Lebanon in June 1982. Due to their relatively high maintenance cost and poor performance capabilities compared to the IAF CH-53s, they were eventually retired in 1991.

=== Libya ===
In 1980–1981, six radar-equipped SA 321GM helicopters and eight SA 321M SAR/transports were delivered to Libya.

=== South Africa ===
South Africa ordered sixteen SA 321L helicopters in 1965, which were delivered by 1967 and assigned to 15 Squadron of the South African Air Force (SAAF). At least two were deployed to Mozambique in support of Rhodesian military operations against insurgents of the Zimbabwe African National Liberation Army between 1978 and 1979. Others were mobilised for evacuating South African paratroops from Angola during Operation Reindeer.

In August 1978, the South West African People's Organization sparked a major border incident between South Africa and Zambia when its guerrillas fired on an SAAF Super Frelon landing at Katima Mulilo from Zambian soil. The South Africans retaliated with an artillery strike, which struck a Zambian Army position.

=== Syria ===
In October 1975, it was widely reported that Syria had ordered fifteen unspecified Super Frelons from France as part of an arms deal funded by Saudi Arabia. While the Syrian Air Force did issue a requirement for fifteen of the specific aircraft, and recommended purchasing up to fifty, by 1984 the sale had still not materialized.

== Variants ==
=== French models ===
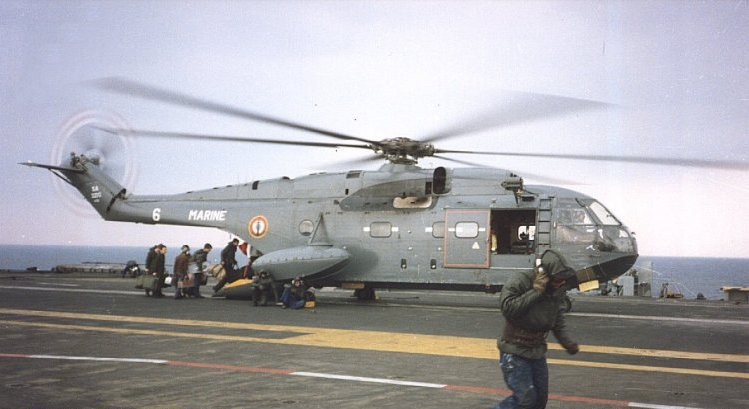
A Super Frelon loading and about to take off from the flight deck of the aircraft carrier Clemenceau

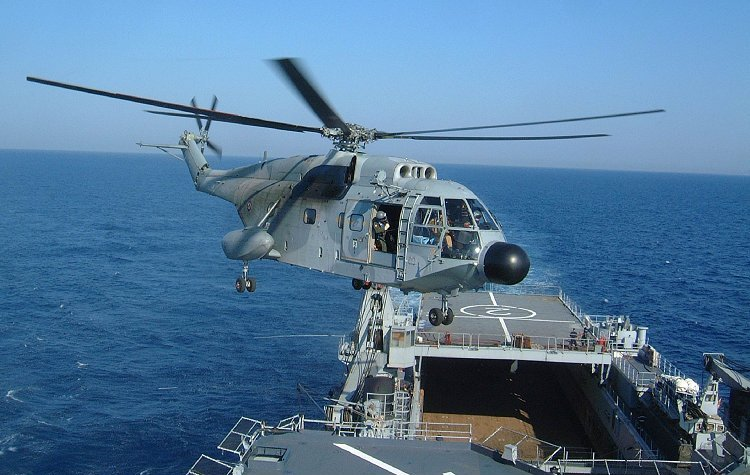
A Super Frelon of the 32F wing, landing on Ouragan

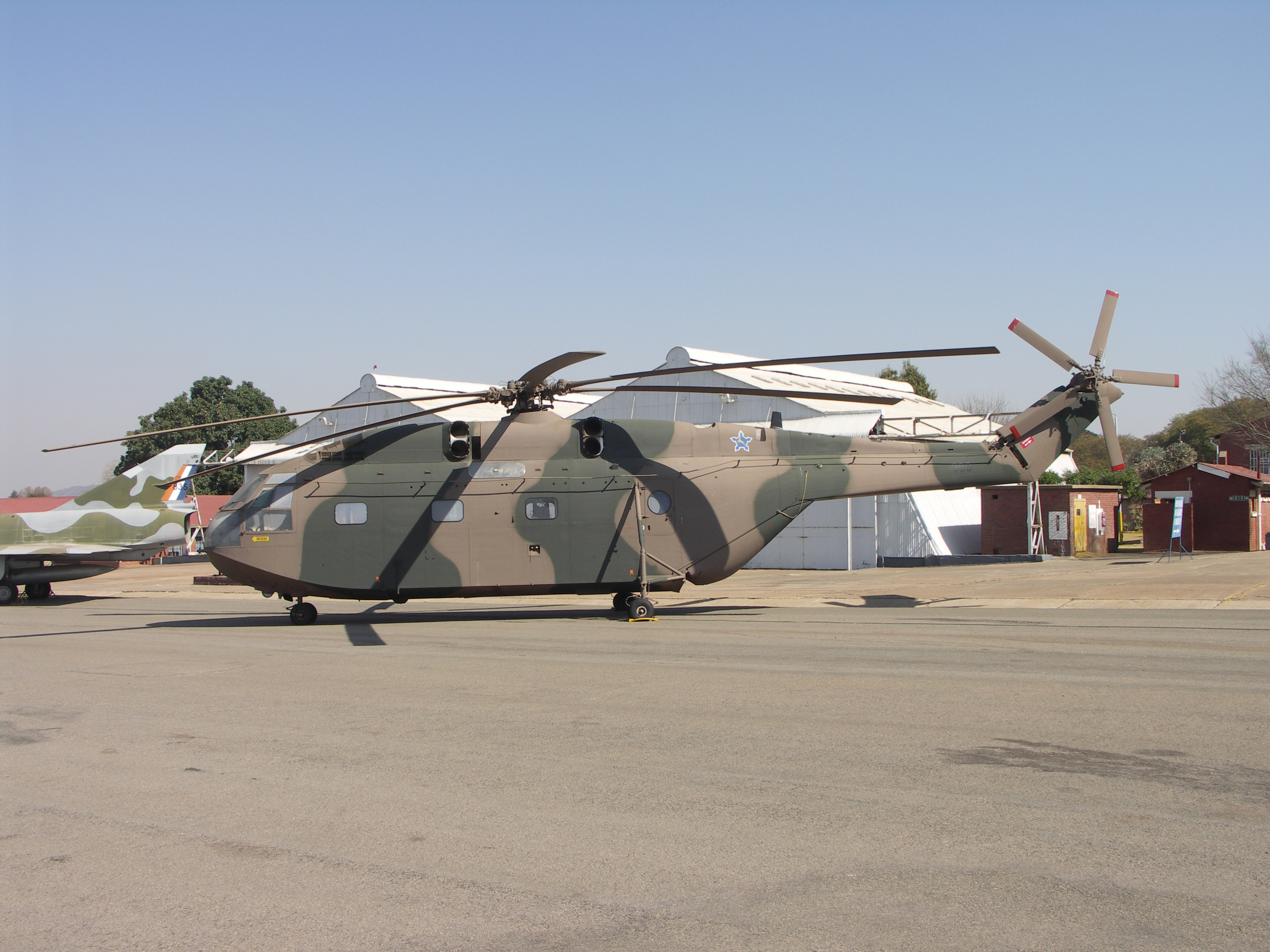
A South African Air Force SA 321L

SE.3200 Frelon
Prototype transport helicopter powered by three 597 kW (800 hp) Turbomeca Turmo IIIB engines driving a four-bladed rotor of 15.2 m (50 ft) diameter. Two built, the first flying on 10 June 1958.
SA 321
Preproduction aircraft. Four built.
SA 321G
Anti-submarine warfare version for the French Navy, it was powered by three Turbomeca IIIC-6 turboshaft engines; 26 built.
SA 321Ga
Utility and assault transport helicopter for the French Navy.
SA 321GM
Export version for Libya, fitted with Omera ORB-32WAS radar.
SA 321H
Export version for Iraq, it was powered by three Turbomeca Turmo IIIE turboshaft engines, fitted with Omera ORB-31D search radar, and armed with Exocet anti-ship missiles.
SA 321F
Commercial airline helicopter, powered by three Turbomeca IIIC-3 turboshaft engines, with accommodation for 34 to 37 passengers.
SA 321J
Commercial transport helicopter and accommodation for 27 passengers.
SA 321Ja
Improved version of the SA 321J.
SA 321K
Military transport version for Israel.
SA 321L
Military transport version for South Africa, fitted with air inlet filters.
SA 321M
Search and rescue, utility transport helicopter for Libya.

=== Foreign derivatives ===
Changhe Z-8
Chinese-built version with three Changzhou WZ-6 turboshaft engines.
Changhe Z-8AEW
Chinese Z-8 variant with retractable radar antenna, AESA radar, 360 degree coverage, redesigned nose similar to the AC313, and FLIR.
Changhe Z-8L
Chinese Z-8 variant with wide-body fuselage and enlarged fuel sponsons, first spotted in January 2019. The internal width of the load area has been increased from 1.8m to 2.4 m, making it larger than old Z-8 and SA321 variants.
Changhe Z-8WJS
Chinese Z-8 variant variant with IR camera, better datalink, and ability to carry firefighting bucket

== Operators ==
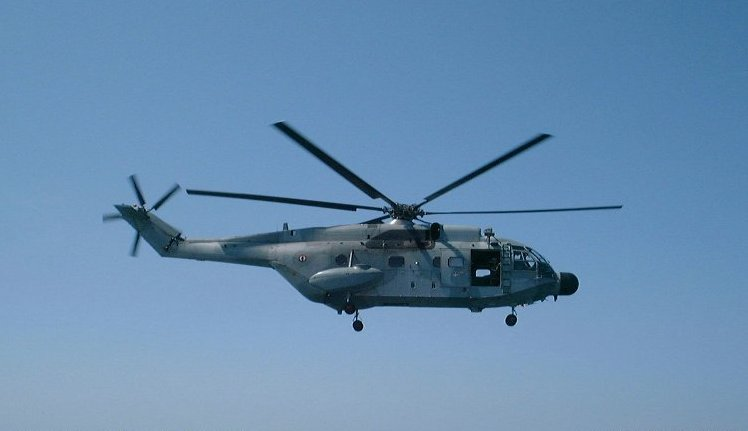
A Super Frelon helicopter of the 35F wing of the French Navy

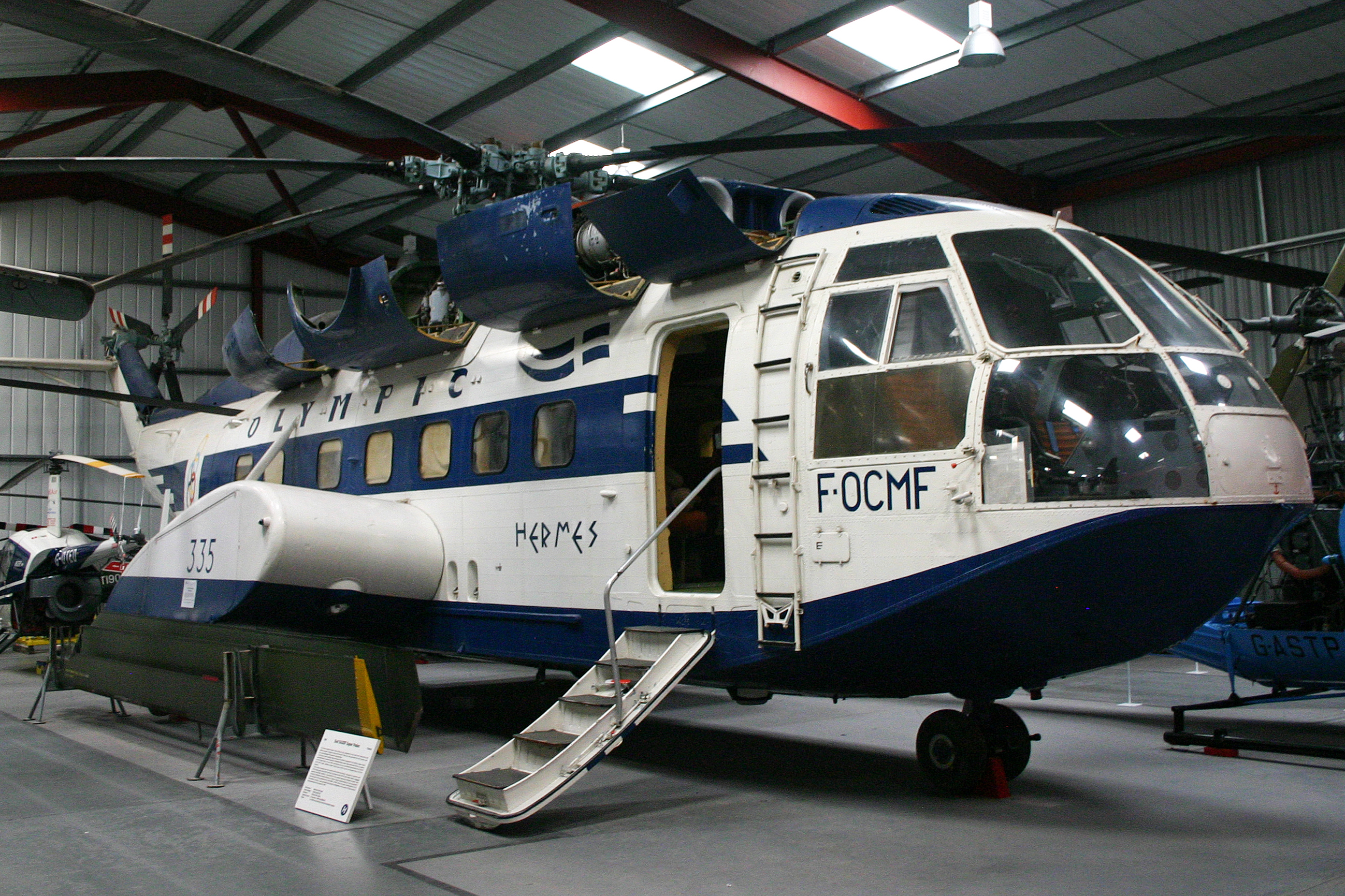
Olympic Airways SA321F Super Frelon F-OCMF now preserved at The Helicopter Museum Weston-super-Mare

China

- People's Liberation Army Air Force
- People's Liberation Army Ground Force
- People's Liberation Army Naval Air Force
- People's Armed Police
  - People's Armed Police Forestry Corps (Z-8WJS) (defunct, handed to National Fire and Rescue Administration)
- National Fire and Rescue Administration
  - National Fire and Rescue Administration Daqing Aerial Rescue Detachment (Z-8WJS) (Inherited from PAP Forestry Corps)
  - National Fire and Rescue Administration Kunming Aerial Rescue Detachment (Z-8WJS)

France

- French Naval Aviation - retired

Greece

- Olympic Airways

Indonesia

- Indonesian Air Force - retired
- Pelita Air Service - the sole example was transferred to the Indonesian Air Force

Iraq

- Iraqi Air Force - 10 delivered in 1980-1981 but status unknown since Gulf War and not with current fleet

Israel

- Israeli Air Force - retired 1996

Libya

- Libyan Air Force - not with current fleet
- Libyan Navy - not with current fleet

South Africa

- South African Air Force - operated 17 and retired after 1990

Zaire

- Air Force of Zaire

== Specifications (Naval Super Frelon) ==
Super Frelon

Data from Jane's All The World's Aircraft 1976–77,

General characteristics

- Crew: 5
- Capacity:
  - 27 passengers or
  - 15 stretchers
- Length: 23.03 m (75 ft 7 in) (overall, rotors turning)
- Fuselage length: 19.40 m (63 ft 8 in)
- Height: 6.66 m (21 ft 10 in)
- Empty weight: 6,863 kg (15,130 lb)
- Max takeoff weight: 13,000 kg (28,660 lb)
- Fuel capacity: 3,975 L (1,050 US gal; 874 imp gal) (normal)
- Powerplant: 3 × Turboméca Turmo IIIC turboshafts, 1,160 kW (1,550 shp) each
- Main rotor diameter: 18.90 m (62 ft 0 in)
- Main rotor area: 280.6 m^{2} (3,020 sq ft)

Performance

- Cruise speed: 249 km/h (155 mph, 134 kn) at sea level
- Never exceed speed: 275 km/h (171 mph, 148 kn)
- Range: 1,020 km (630 mi, 550 nmi)
- Endurance: four hours
- Service ceiling: 3,150 m (10,330 ft)
- Rate of climb: 6.66 m/s (1,312 ft/min)

Armament

- 4× homing torpedoes in the ASW role or
- 2× Exocet missiles with the ORB-31 radar-equipped variant

== See also ==
Related development

- Avicopter AC313
- Changhe Z-8
- SNCASE SE.3200 Frelon

Aircraft of comparable role, configuration, and era

- Agusta A.101
- AgustaWestland AW101
- Mil Mi-8
- Sikorsky SH-3 Sea King

Related lists

- List of rotorcraft
