= Stealth helicopter =

Class of helicopters

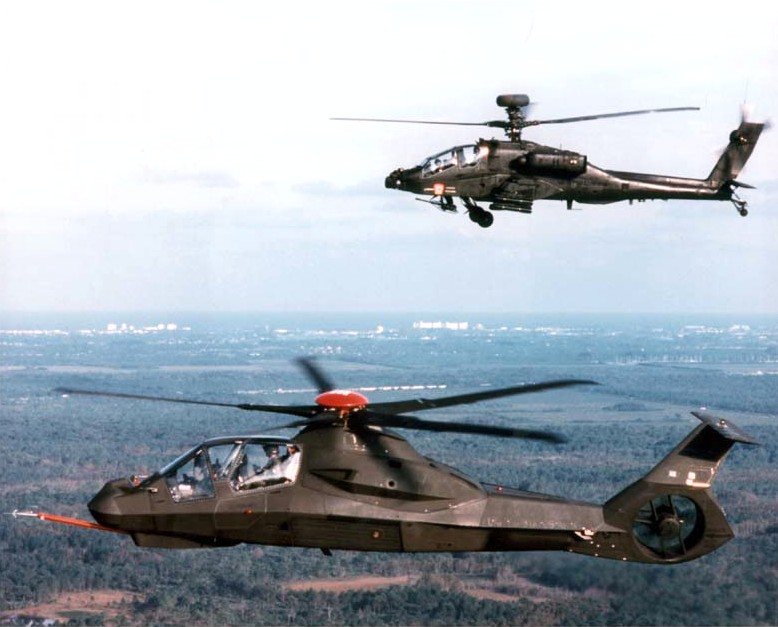
A stealthy RAH-66 Comanche (foreground) flying in formation with a non-stealthy AH-64 Apache (background)

Stealth helicopters are helicopters that incorporate stealth technology to decrease an enemy's detection ability. There is a diverse range of technologies used to achieve this decreased detectability; these have largely involved the reduction of several different signatures typically generated by a rotorcraft, including those of noise, radar, and infrared.

In many ways, helicopters are less suitable for stealth technology than fixed-wing aircraft are; one such area is their rotor blades, which not only generate copious noise levels but can also give off a strong radar signature. However, blade designs have been developed that can significantly reduce noise, which has traditionally been a major issue for any operation involving the clandestine use of helicopters. Numerous helicopters have incorporated profiled fuselages to reduce their radar cross-section (RCS). Constructing elements of the rotorcraft from certain materials is another means of minimizing radar visibility.

It is known that some nations have used such rotorcraft operationally, albeit in a limited scope, since the 1970s; a modified Hughes 500P was used by the Central Intelligence Agency (CIA) during the Vietnam War. Various helicopters have been furnished with infrared exhaust suppressors to reduce their vulnerability to infrared homing weapons. Attack helicopters, such as the Changhe Z-10, Eurocopter Tiger, and HAL Prachand have incorporated numerous presence reduction technologies into their design to increase their survivability. The raid on the compound of Osama bin Laden in May 2011 utilized what appeared to be two Sikorsky UH-60 Black Hawks, heavily modified for quieter operations and employing stealth technology to be less visible to radar. Furthermore, various nations have stated their ambitions to introduce their own stealth helicopters.

== History ==
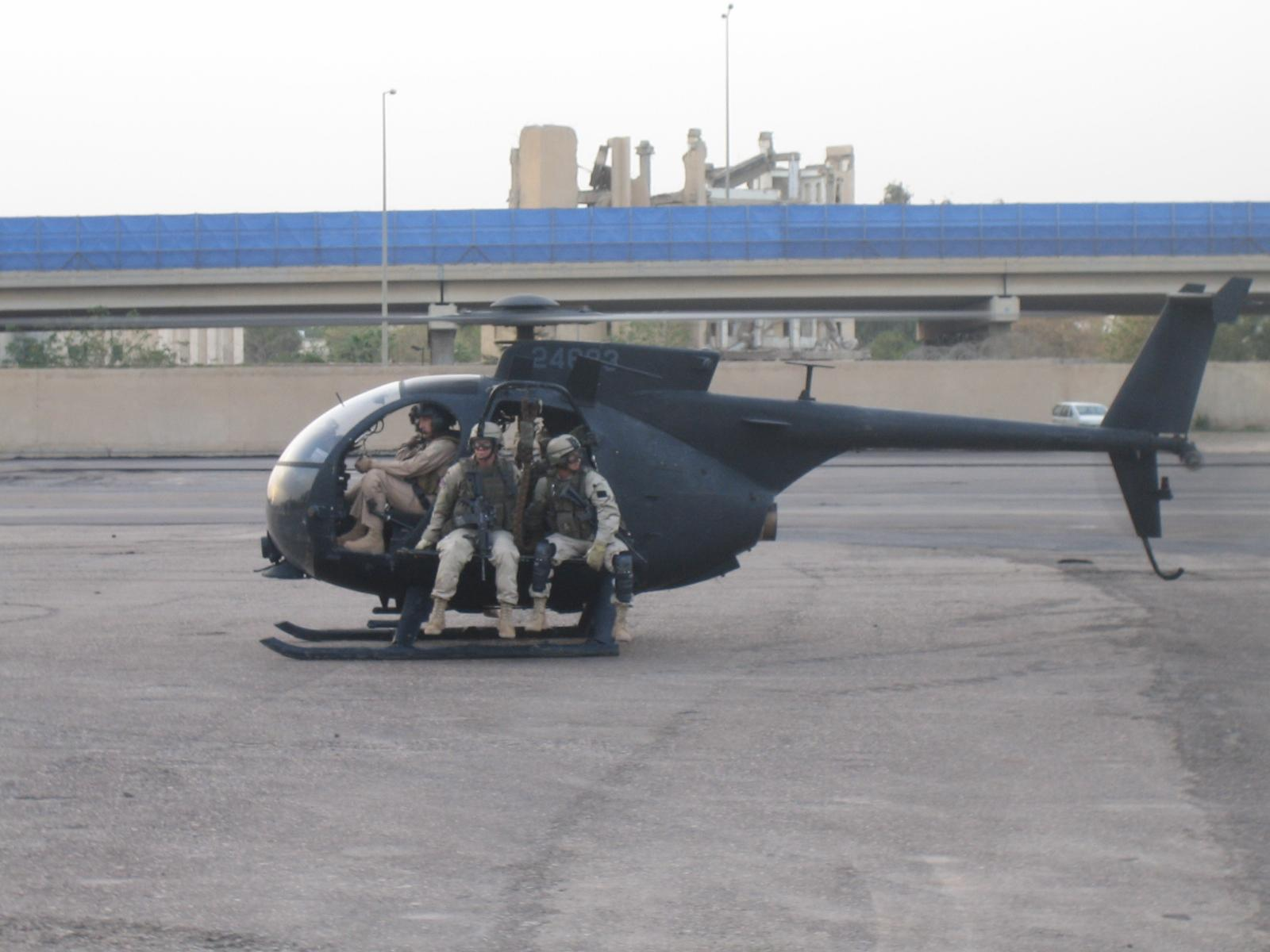
An OH-6 Cayuse, similar to the Hughes 500P

Efforts to develop helicopters which possessed low observability characteristics commenced during the Cold War period. It was during this time that several different stealth helicopters would first emerge. The Central Intelligence Agency (CIA) was one such party seeking such rotorcraft, during the early 1970s, a single modified Hughes 500P was produced for the agency; it had a reduced noise operation capability, leading to its nickname of "The Quiet One". It was reportedly used in at least one operation by the CIA, to deploy a wiretap during the Vietnam War.

Such helicopters were considered advantageous by several military planners. The United States Army sought to develop a stealth helicopter for aerial reconnaissance missions; between 1996 and 2004, work on the Boeing/Sikorsky RAH-66 Comanche entered the prototype stage with an eye towards production. However, the Comanche programme was ultimately cancelled, both due to rising costs and the considerable technical issues which had been experienced. However, other efforts continued. It is known that a number of Sikorsky UH-60 Black Hawks have been outfitted with stealth technologies; these features reportedly include the use of specialized materials, along with numerous harsh angles and flat surfaces across the exterior fuselage, techniques that had previously been employed upon other stealth aircraft.

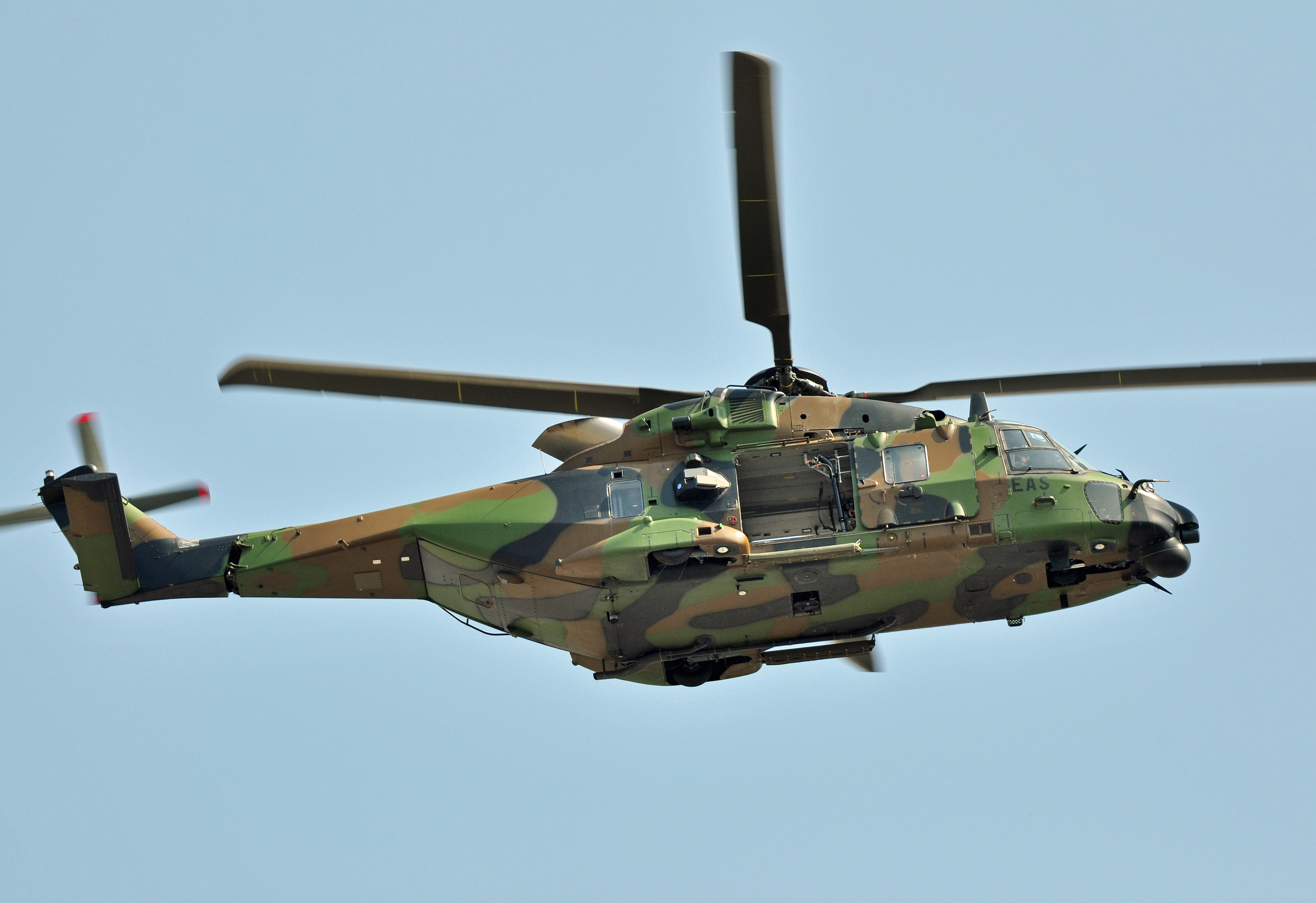
A French Army NHIndustries NH90

Various other nations have worked on stealth helicopter technology. During the 1980s, British company Westland Helicopters undertook a top secret research programme towards developing a stealth attack helicopter. Being based on the Westland Lynx, the proposed design was internally designated WG 47; its configuration included a faceted fuselage with internally stored weapons, twin canted tail rotors and the routing of engine, environmental and cooling system exhausts into a side-exiting infrared suppressor. It featured a tandem cockpit, the glazing of which was specifically angled outward to eliminate optical glint towards the horizon. The programme was concluded during 1987.

Westland's stealth helicopter research subsequently influenced its other programs; the NHIndustries NH90 was one such beneficiary via the application of stealth profiling techniques into its fuselage design. The AgustaWestland AW159 Wildcat, advanced development of the Westland Lynx, also incorporated several stealth features, such as infrared exhaust suppressors; such devices have been installed on other platforms by the company, including the AgustaWestland Apache. Such measures augment the effectiveness of its defensive aids suite, which includes missile warning sensors and countermeasures dispensers.

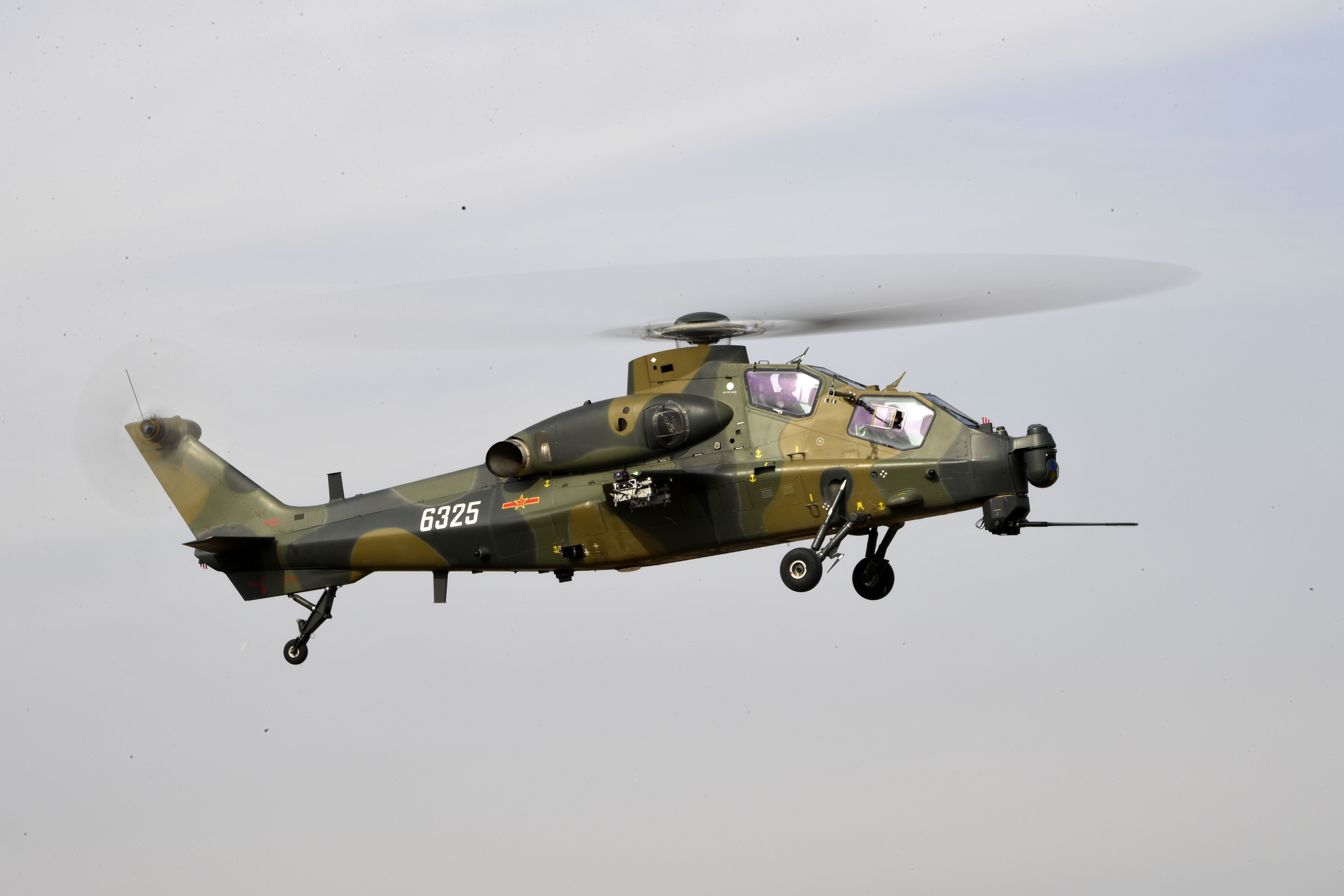
PLAAF Z-10K, featuring a rhombic fuselage blended into the canted upper and lower parts

In 1990s, the 602nd Aircraft Design Institute of Aviation Industry Corporation of China (AVIC) and Kamov Design Bureau co-developed the Changhe Z-10 helicopter, which is designed to incorporate stealth characteristics. The airframe features a slim, rhombic shape, blended fuselage with the top and bottom half canted inward and merging with the stub wings and tail boom, creating a distinctive ridge line, intended to reduce helicopter's frontal profile and radar cross section (RCS). The radar-absorbent material is applied to the fuselage to reduce radar reflection. The Z-10's engine system is fitted with the Hover Infrared Suppression System (HIRSS), mixing in the engine exhaust with cold air to reduce the helicopter's infrared characteristic. Later serial production of Z-10 modified the engine nozzle from sideway-facing to the upward-facing direction, further reducing the signature from heat radiation. Beside the Z-10, the Harbin Z-19 attack helicopter, which was derived from the Eurocopter AS365 Dauphin, had reportedly integrated several stealth features to enhance its survivability. In 2013, rumours circulated that China had reverse engineered its own stealth helicopter using knowledge gained from the Osama bin Laden raid; China has issued strong denials that it has ever had access to the stealth helicopter's wreckage. During late 2015, reports emerged that a new Chinese attack helicopter with stealthy characteristics was being actively developed.

It is believed that one or multiple of the UH-60 Black Hawks used in the raid upon Osama bin Laden's compound on 1 May 2011 featured stealth technologies. Prior to the raid, the existence of such helicopters had been unknown. One of the UH-60s had crashed during the raid, leading to the remains being recovered and studied by various authorities, revealing the existence of this type to the public. The helicopter's most notable features are the extreme modifications to the nose, the "doghouse" where the engines and main gearbox are situated, as well as the engine intakes and exhausts. It also has a heavily modified rotor hub. All of these features appear to be designed to reduce its radar signature, especially from the critical forward hemisphere aspect.

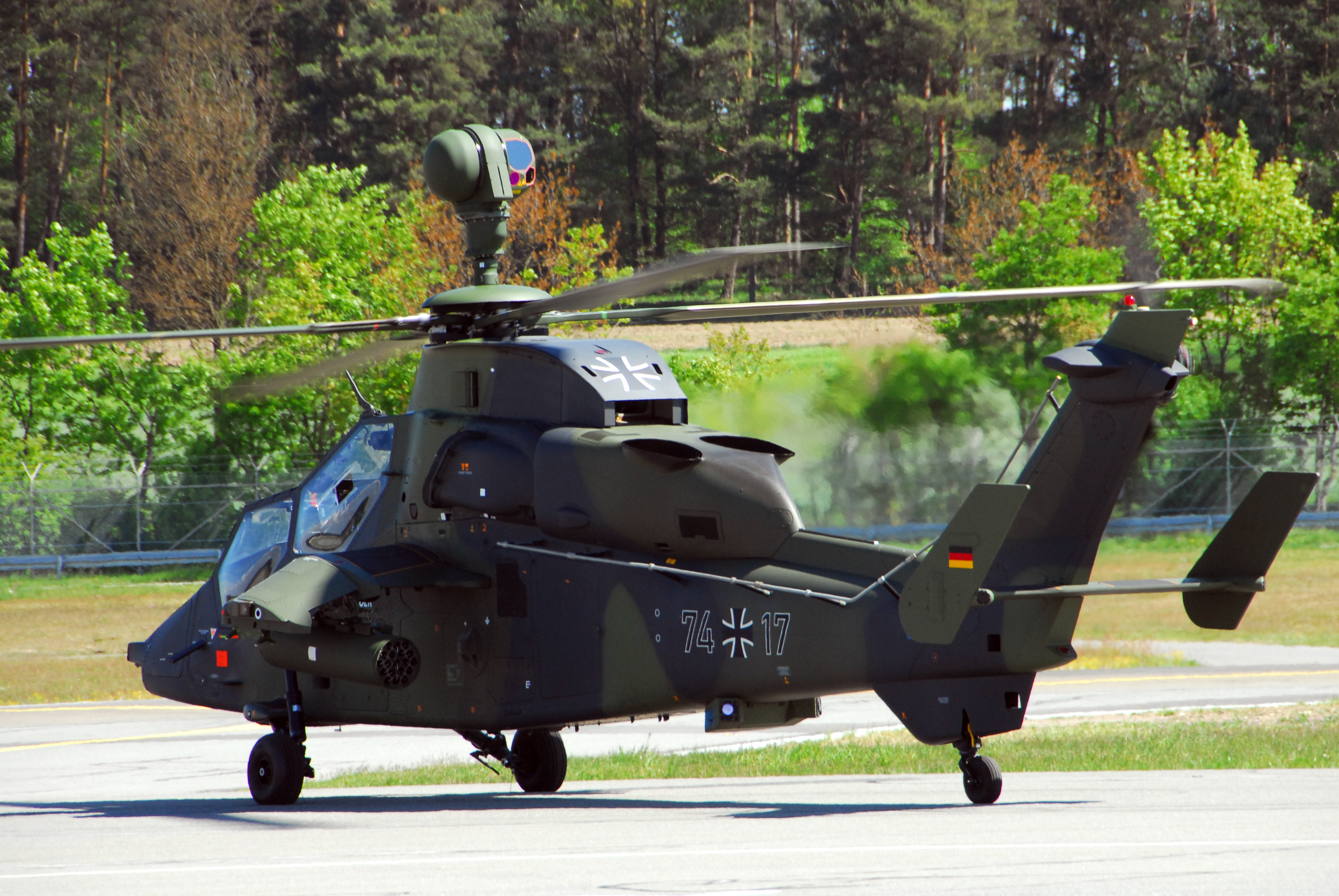
A German Eurocopter Tiger at Grafenwöhr Army Airfield

Several production helicopters, including the HAL Prachand and Eurocopter Tiger, reportedly feature presence-reduction measures or "stealth". The use of advanced composite materials on the airframe has commonly resulted in reductions in an aircraft's radar cross-section (RCS). In the case of the Eurocopter Tiger, numerous measures were incorporated in its design so that it would possess minimal visual, radar, infra-red and acoustic signatures, which enhances the Tiger's battlefield survivability. HAL's Prachand (LCH) is reported to feature a digital camouflage system, an infrared (IR) suppressor fitted to the engine exhaust, and an exterior covered by canted flat panels to minimise its radar cross-section (RCS). It is furnished with an integrated dynamic system, including a hinge less main rotor and bearing-less tail rotor, which works in conjunction with an anti-resonance isolation system to dampen vibrations.

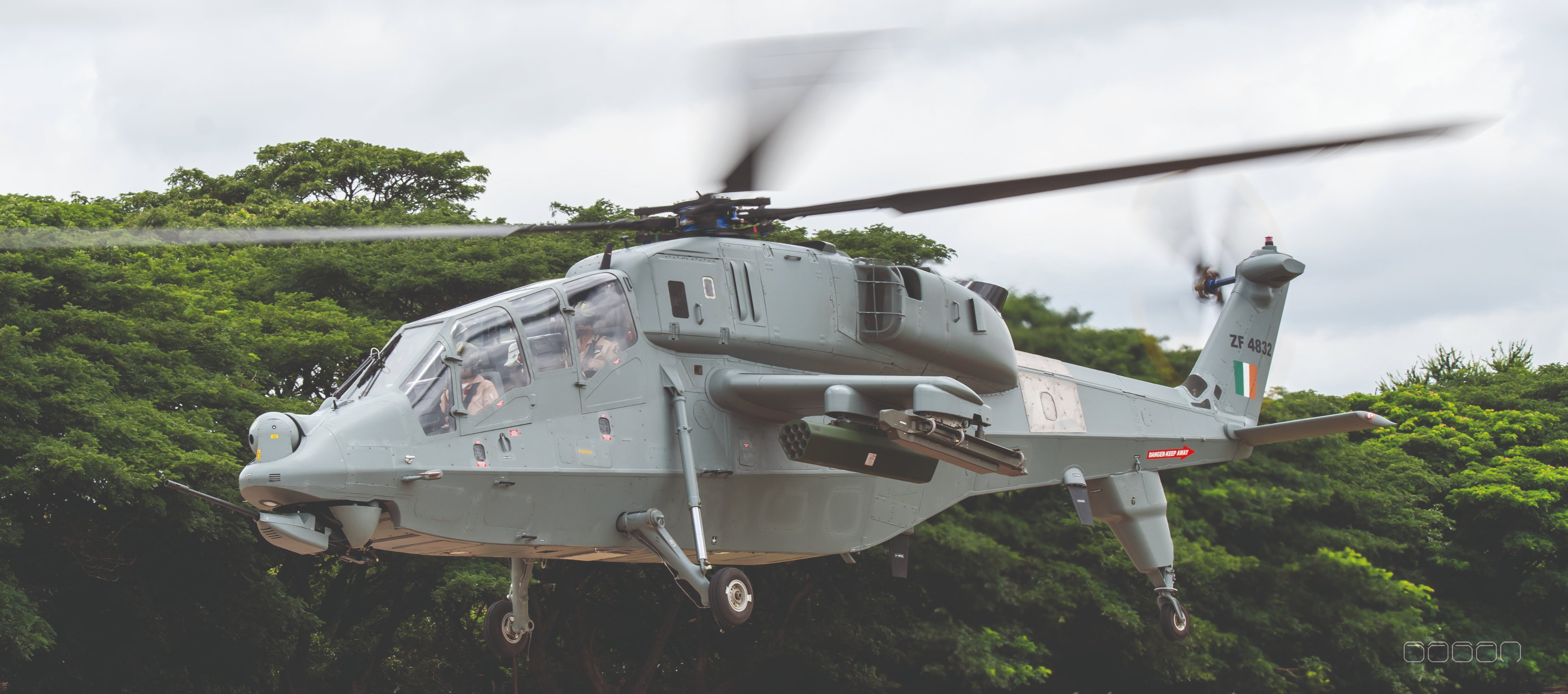
An Indian Air Force HAL Prachand (LCH)

Bell 360 Invictus, is a reconnaissance and attack helicopter that is being is offered to the US Army's Future Attack Reconnaissance Aircraft (FARA). It is currently under development and incorporates a smooth, rounded fuselage, single rotor, back tail rotor and internal weapons bay, intended to reduce radar signature. While the exact extent of the 360s stealth properties may not be available for security reasons, the visible external shape and internal weapons bay do seem to exhibit radar signature reducing capabilities.

During October 2018, leaked images of a future as-of-yet unnamed Kamov helicopter that possessed stealth features appeared online. The footage was displayed in a meeting chaired by Sergei Mikheyev, General Designer of the Kamov Design Bureau, in front of Russian officials. The stealth technology used to decrease the RCS of this helicopter and to avoid its detection includes infrared heat suppressing systems and various stealthy fuselage contour constructions, in addition to an internal weapons bay. Alternative design proposals have since emerged, one harnessing an unorthodox canard configuration that was allegedly capable of great manoeuvrability and a high top speed along with its stealth features.

== See also ==
- Index of aviation articles
- Black helicopter
- Unmanned aerial vehicle
