= WZ-9 =

WZ9 or WZ-9 may refer to:

- AVIC WZ-9, a Chinese turboshaft engine
- Harbin Z-9W, a Chinese attack/utility helicopter
- Shenyang WZ-9 Divine Eagle, a Chinese unmanned aerial vehicle
