= AVIC WZ-9 =

WZ-9
- Type: turboshaft
- National origin: People's Republic of China
- Manufacturer: AVIC South Aviation Industry Company
- Designer: AVIC Air Power Machinery Research Institute
- Major applications: Changhe Z-10

The WZ-9 is a turboshaft engine developed by the Aviation Industry Corporation of China. It entered production in 2009.

== Variants ==
WZ-9
1,000 kW (1,300 shp) Turboshaft engine for the Z-10 helicopter.
WZ-9C
1,200 kW (1,600 shp) upgraded turboshaft engine for the newer batches of the Z-10 helicopter.

== Specifications (WZ-9) ==
==== General characteristics ====
- Type: turboshaft engine
- Length:
- Diameter:
- Dry weight:

==== Components ====
- Compressor:

==== Performance ====
- Maximum power output: 1,000 kW (1,341 hp)
