= 602nd Aircraft Design Institute =

602nd Aircraft Design Institute is a Chinese design institute and jointer partners with Xian Aircraft Industry Corporation of military aircraft. The institute is located at 20 Renmin Road in Yanliang District of Xi'an near the Yanliang Air Base.

Their key clients are the People's Liberation Army Naval Air Force and the People's Liberation Army Air Force.

They are a main contractor for the Xian JH-7, a two-seater twin-engine fighter-bomber in service with the People's Liberation Army Naval Air Force (PLANAF).

== Products ==
- Xian JH-7 - tandem fighter-bomber
