= DJI Agras =

Chinese agricultural drone

Agras
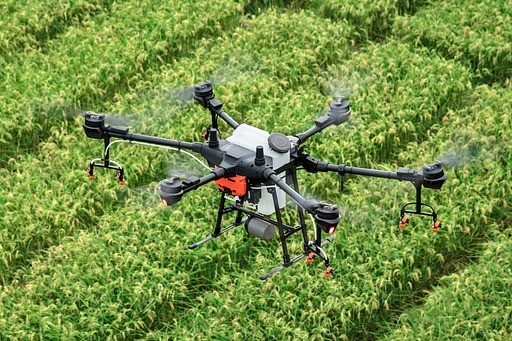
- Agras T16 flying over a field

General information
- Type: Agricultural drone
- National origin: China
- Manufacturer: DJI

History
- Manufactured: 2015–present
- Developed into: DJI FlyCart

The DJI Agras is a series of multirotor agricultural drones released by the Chinese technology company DJI. It was first released in 2015 with a 10 L (2.6 US gal) pesticide tank. Later models gradually increased tank capacity up to 100 L (26 US gal). The Agras was built for aerial application, and is also used for military applications and disease control.

== Design and development ==
=== MG-series ===
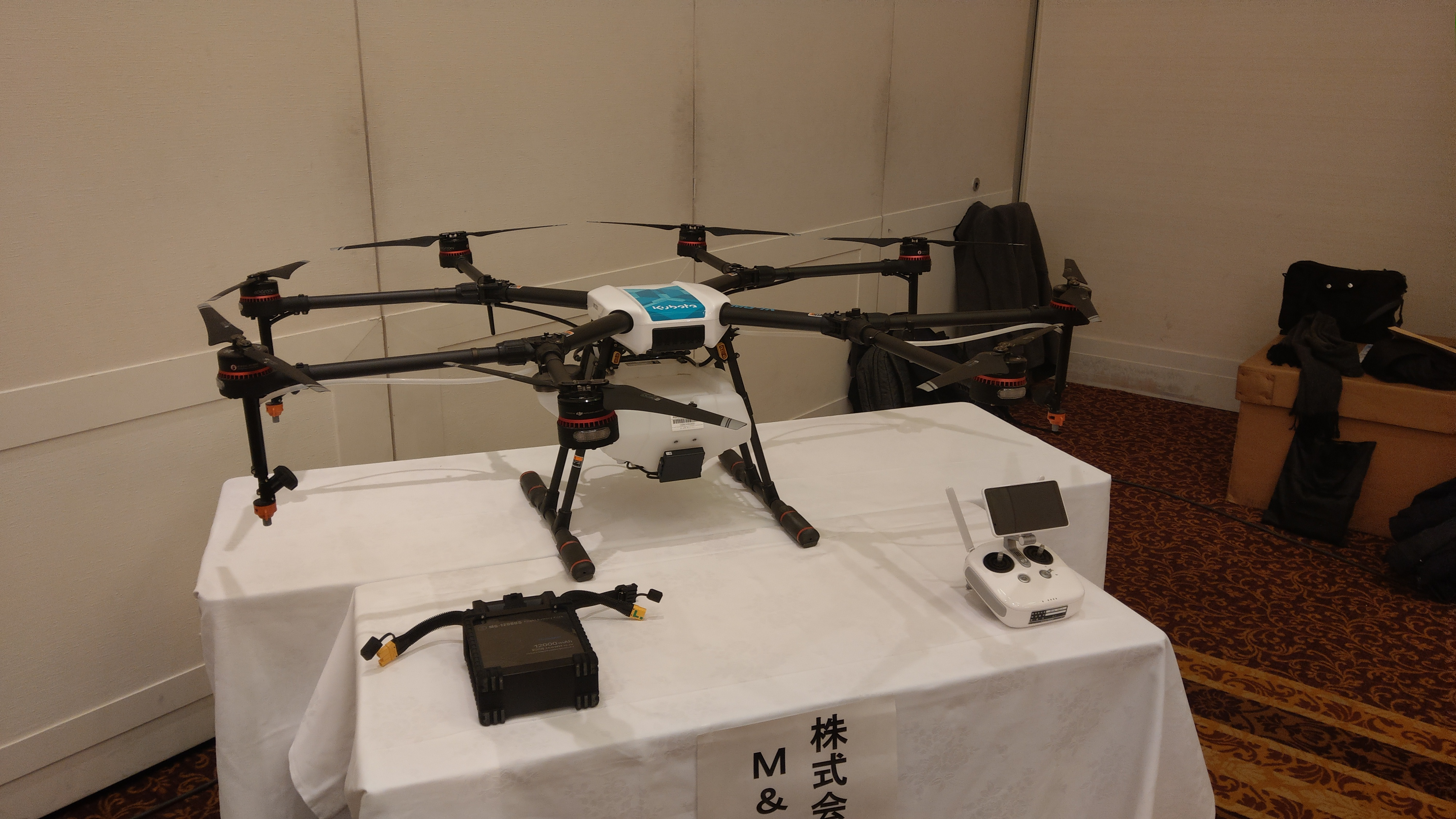
Agras MG-1S

DJI released the Agras MG-1 in November 2015. The first DJI drone designed for agriculture, the Agras MG-1 is a foldable octocopter (eight-rotor helicopter) with four XR11001 spray nozzles for aerial application and a 10 kg (22 lb) or 10 L (2.6 US gal) pesticide tank. The drone's sealed body features an integrated centrifugal cooling system for the motors with a filter to prevent intake of particles to reduce motor wear. Each spray nozzle is powered by a motor and can coordinate spray intensity with the drone's airspeed. The drone is capable of returning to a saved position after refilling its tank and recharging its battery. The Agras MG-1 is powered by a DJI MG-12000 battery, giving it a hover time of 24 minutes with a 12.5 kg (28 lb) takeoff weight or 10 minutes with a 22.5 kg (50 lb) takeoff weight.

The improved Agras MG-1S was released in November 2016, differing from its predecessor primarily in the addition of a forward/rearward obstacle avoidance system and the capability for both manual and automatic operations. The Agras MG-1S RTK was released alongside the standard MG-1S, differing in that it has a built-in real-time kinematic (RTK) positioning module. The Agras MG-1SA was released in November 2017 with a first-person view (FPV) camera.

The Agras MG-1P and MG-1P RTK were released alongside the MG-1SA in November 2017. The MG-1P series features an FPV camera like the MG-1SA, but also has four XR11001VS spray nozzles and is powered by a DJI MG-12000P battery, giving it a hover time of 20 minutes with a 13.8 kg (30 lb) takeoff weight or 9 minutes with a 23.8 kg (52 lb) takeoff weight.

=== T-series ===
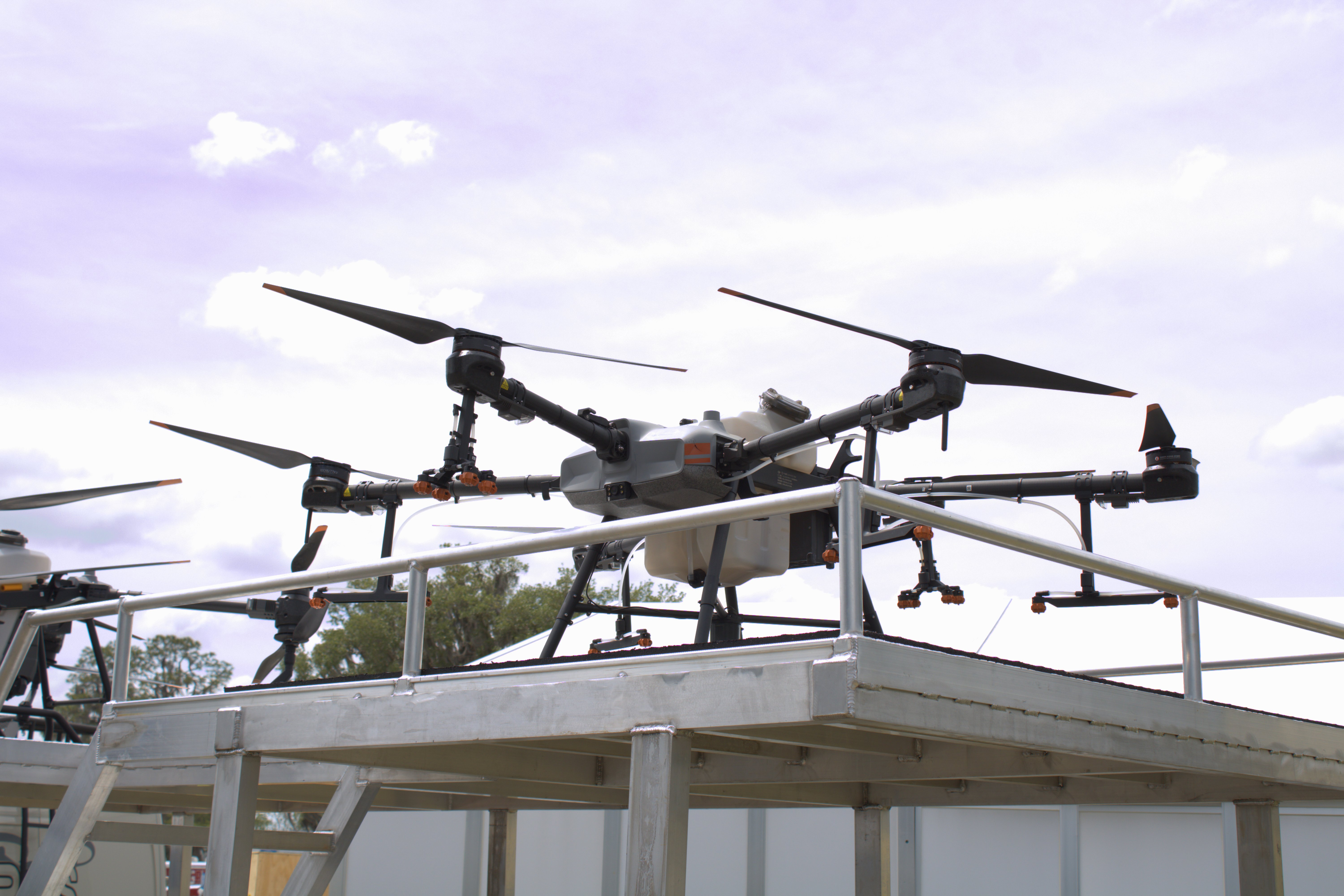
Agras T30 at 2024 Sun 'n Fun

The Agras T16 was released in December 2018 as the successor to the Agras MG-series. Unlike its predecessor, the T16 is a hexacopter with six motors driving foldable Model R3390 propellers, with its structure being redesigned to conform to the IP67 environmental rating. Tank capacity was increased to 16 L (4.2 US gal), with pesticides being spread via eight XR11001VS nozzles fed by four delivery pumps. The nozzles could also be swapped for the optional XR110015VS model, which increased spray rate from 3.6 L/min to 4.8 L/min. The T16 is capable of satellite navigation with GPS, GLONASS, and Galileo satellites, as well as BeiDou with RTK positioning enabled. The drone also features an FPV camera, an RD2418R digital beamforming (DBF) imaging radar, an obstacle avoidance system, and a 17500 mAh battery giving it a hover time of 18 minutes with a 24.5 kg (54 lb) takeoff weight or 10 minutes with a 39.5 kg (87 lb) takeoff weight.

An enlarged version, the Agras T20, was released in November 2020 with a tank capacity of 20 L (5.3 US gal) and an omnidirectional RD2428R radar. The T20 features eight SX11001VS nozzles with a flow rate of 3.6 L/min as standard, though optional SX110015VS (4.8 L/min flow rate) and XR11002VS (6 L/min flow rate) nozzles were also made available. Battery capacity was increased to 18000 mAh, giving the drone a hover time of 15 minutes with a 27.5 kg (61 lb) takeoff weight or 10 minutes with a 42.6 kg (94 lb) takeoff weight.

Two more models, the Agras T10 quadcopter and Agras T30 hexacopter, were released globally in August 2021 after being made available in China in late-2020. Both drones feature an omnidirectional RD2424R radar, a RD2414U top-view radar, and dual FPV cameras; one forward and one rear. The T30 was the flagship model, and features a 30 L (7.9 US gal) tank capacity and 16 SX11001VS nozzles with a flow rate of 7.2 L/min as standard, with optional SX110015VS nozzles (8 L/min flow rate) being offered as well as TX-VK04 nozzles (3.6 L/min flow rate) for use on fruit trees. The smaller T10 features an 8 L (2.1 US gal) tank capacity as standard, with an optional 10 L (2.6 US gal) tank being made available in some regions, and four XR11001VS nozzles with a flow rate of 1.8 L/min as standard, with optional XR110015VS nozzles (2.4 L/min flow rate) and XR11002VS nozzles (3 L/min flow rate) also being offered. The T30 is powered by a 29000 mAh battery giving it a hover time of 20.5 minutes with a 36.5 kg (80 lb) takeoff weight or 7.8 minutes with a 66.5 kg (147 lb) takeoff weight, while the T10 has a 9500 mAh giving it a hover time of 17 minutes with a 16 kg (35 lb) takeoff weight or 9 minutes with a 24.8 kg (55 lb) takeoff weight.

In November 2021, DJI released two improved models; the Agras T20P quadcopter and Agras T40 octo-quad. Both models are capable of using BeiDou satellites in both GNSS and RTK navigation modes and feature a gimballed FPV camera, a phased array radar system consisting of an omnidirectional RD2484R and backward/downward-looking RD2484B radar, and a pair of LX8060SZ spray nozzles. The T40, which replaced the T30 as the flagship model, features a tank with a 40 L (11 US gal) capacity and is powered by a 30000 mAh battery giving it a hover time of 18 minutes with a 50 kg (110 lb) takeoff weight, 7 minutes with a 90 kg (200 lb) takeoff weight, or 6 minutes with a 101 kg (223 lb) takeoff weight. The T20P has a 20 L (5.3 US gal) and is powered by a 13000 mAh battery, giving it a hover time of 14.5 minutes with a 32 kg (71 lb) takeoff weight, 7 minutes with a 52 kg (115 lb) takeoff weight, or 6 minutes with a 58 kg (128 lb) takeoff weight.

The Agras T25 quadcopter and Agras T50 octo-quad were released in 2022 to replace the T20P/T40. The T25 retained the 20 L (5.3 US gal) spray tank of the T20P, but can also be fitted with a 35 L (9.2 US gal) tank with an internal load of 25 kg (55 lb) for spreading dry fertilizer. Likewise, the T50 also retained the 40 L (11 US gal) spray tank of its predecessor, but can also be fitted with a 75 L (20 US gal) spreading tank with an internal load of 50 kg (110 lb). Both drones feature two LX8060SZ spray nozzles, though the T50 can be fitted with two additional nozzles to increase flow rate from 16 L/min to 24 L/min. Both models also have a phased array radar system consisting of a forward-looking RD241608RF and backward-looking RD241608RB radar. The T50 is powered by a 30000 mAh DB1560 battery, while the T25 is powered by a 15500 mAh DB800 battery.

The T25P quadcopter was released in China prior to November 2023. The drone features two LX07550SX spray nozzles and retains the DB800 battery of its predecessor. The T25P also uses an O3 video transmission system with four antennas, giving it a transmission range of 2 km (1.2 mi). The T60 quadcopter was released in China November 2023 and marketed alongside the T25P. Compared to the T40, the T60 has new electronic speed controllers (ESC) and more powerful motors, allowing a maximum payload of 60 kg (130 lb), as well as a new 40000 mAh DB2100 battery and an O4 video transmission system. The T60 also features a two-nozzle spray system as standard, though two additional nozzles can be added to increase flow rate.

Three more variants were released in China in November 2024; the Agras T70 and Agras T70P quadcopters and the Agras T100 octo-quad. Both the T70 and T70P feature a 70 L (18 US gal) tank, though the T70 is limited to a payload of 50 L (13 US gal) due to its battery size, while the T70P has an upgraded battery allowing it to utilize the full tank. The T100 has a 100 L (26 US gal) tank as well as new AI flight algorithms.

== Operational history ==
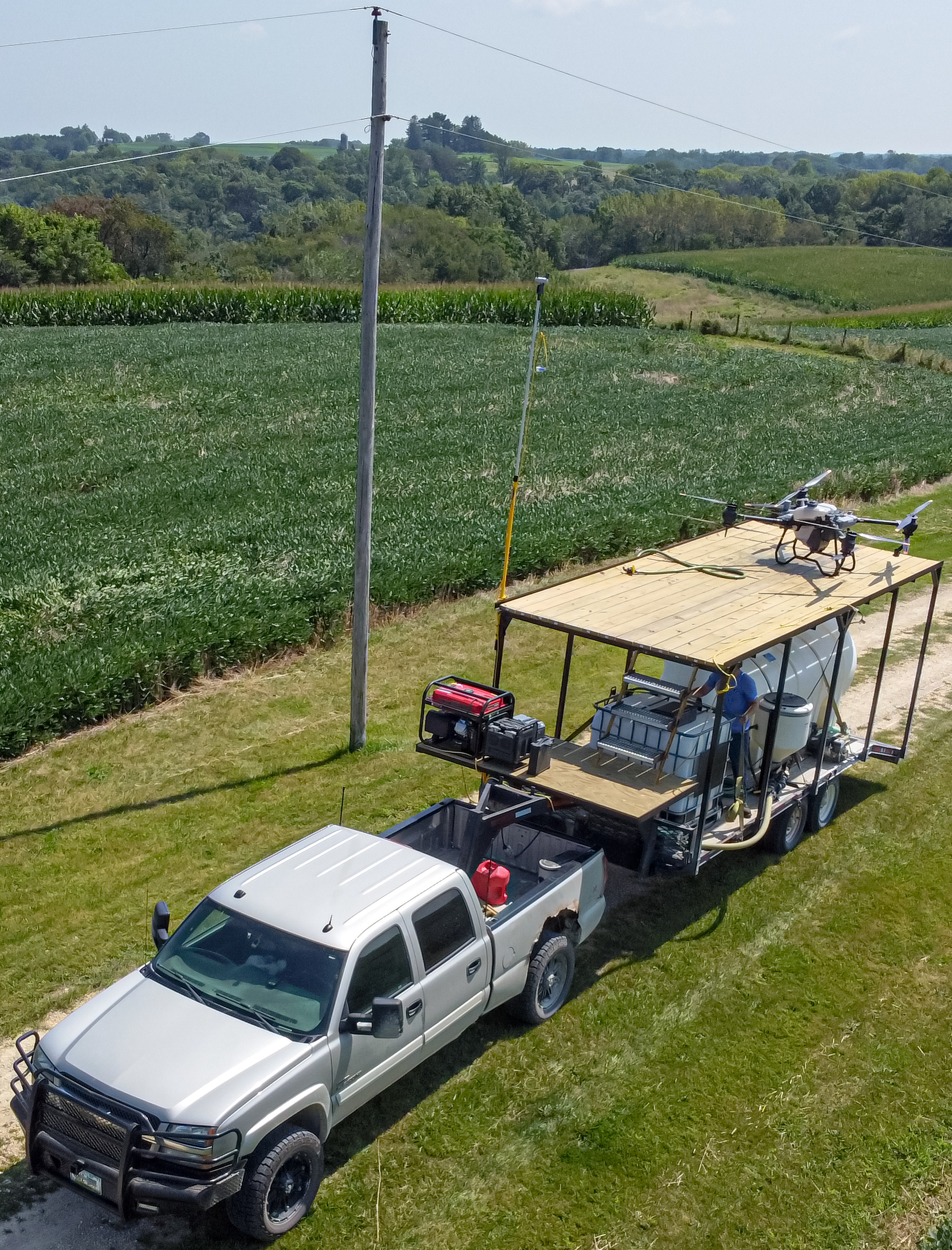
DJI Agras on a fertilizer trailer

As part of the Zanzibar Malaria Elimination Program, Agras drones were used test a silicone-based pesticide to prevent malaria-carrying mosquitos from laying eggs in rice paddies in 2019. An Agras MG-1S and T16 were also used test disinfecting procedures at Chicagoland Park in Chicago during the COVID-19 pandemic, though the drones sprayed water rather than disinfectant for the test.

== Variants ==
=== Octocopter variants ===
Agras MG-1
Company designation Model AG012. Initial model with a 10 L (2.6 US gal) pesticide tank, maximum payload of 10 kg (22 lb), four XR11001 spray nozzles. Powered by a MG-12000 battery, giving it a hover time of 24 minutes with a 12.5 kg (28 lb) takeoff weight or 10 minutes with a 22.5 kg (50 lb) takeoff weight. Released in November 2015.
Agras MG-1S
Company designation Model 3W-DJI-8-10-015. Improved MG-1 with a forward/rearward obstacle avoidance system and the capability for both manual and automatic operations. Released alongside the MG-1S RTK in November 2016.
Agras MG-1S RTK
As MG-1S but with a built-in real-time kinematic (RTK) positioning module. Released alongside the MG-1S in November 2016.
Agras MG-1SA
As MG-1S but with a first-person view (FPV) camera. Released alongside the MG-1P and MG-1P RTK in November 2017.
Agras MG-1P
Company designation Model 3WWDSZ-10016. As MG-1SA but with four XR11001VS spray nozzles and a MG-12000P battery, giving it a hover time of 20 minutes with a 13.8 kg (30 lb) takeoff weight or 9 minutes with a 23.8 kg (52 lb) takeoff weight. Released alongside the MG-1SA and MG-1P RTK in November 2017.
Agras MG-1P RTK
Company designation Model 3WWDSZ-10017. As MG-1S but with a built-in RTK module. Released alongside the MG-1SA and MG-1P in November 2017.

=== Hexacopter variants ===
Agras T16
Company designation Model 3WWDZ-15A. Successor to the MG-series with IP67-rated structure, six motors driving R3390 propellers, 16 L (4.2 US gal) spray tank, eight XR11001VS (standard) or XR110015VS (optional) spray nozzles, satellite navigation compatible with GPS, GLONASS, Galileo, and BeiDou (RTK only) satellites, RD2418R digital beamforming (DBF) imaging radar, and an obstacle avoidance system. Powered by a 17500 mAh battery giving it a hover time of 18 minutes with a 24.5 kg (54 lb) takeoff weight or 10 minutes with a 39.5 kg (87 lb) takeoff weight. Released in December 2018.
Agras T20
Company designation Model 3WWDZ-15.1B. Model with a 20 L (5.3 US gal) spray tank, an omnidirectional RD2428R radar, and eight SX11001VS nozzles. Optional SX110015VS and XR11002VS nozzles, both with increased flow rates, were also available. Powered by a 18000 mAh battery giving it a hover time of 15 minutes with a 27.5 kg (61 lb) takeoff weight or 10 minutes with a 42.6 kg (94 lb) takeoff weight. Released in November 2020.
Agras T30
Company designation Model 3WWDZ-30A. Flagship model with a 30 L (7.9 US gal) tank, an omnidirectional RD2424R and RD2414U top-view radar, dual FPV cameras, and 16 SX11001VS nozzles. Optional SX110015VS nozzles with increased flow rate and TX-VK04 nozzles for fruit trees were also offered. Powered by a 29000 mAh battery giving it a hover time of 20.5 minutes with a 36.5 kg (80 lb) takeoff weight or 7.8 minutes with a 66.5 kg (147 lb) takeoff weight. Released alongside the T10 in China in late-2020 and globally in August 2021.

=== Quadcopter variants ===
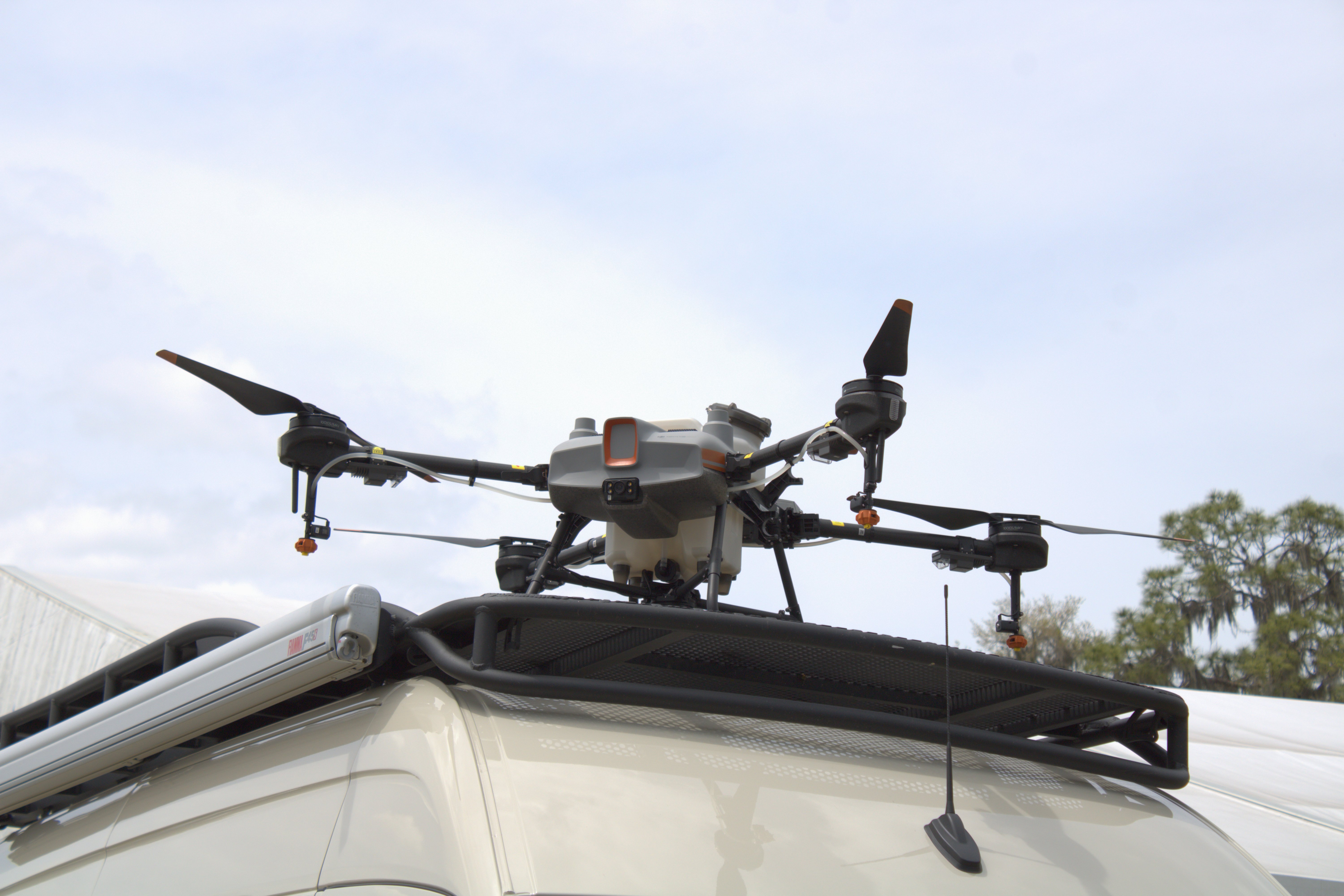
Agras T10 on display at 2024 Sun 'n Fun

Agras T10
Company designation Model 3WWDZ-10A. Model with a 8 L (2.1 US gal) tank, an omnidirectional RD2424R and RD2414U top-view radar, dual FPV cameras, and four XR11001VS nozzles. Optional XR110015VS and XR11002VS nozzles, both with increased flow rates, were also available, as was an optional 10 L (2.6 US gal) tank in some regions. Powered by a 9500 mAh giving it a hover time of 17 minutes with a 16 kg (35 lb) takeoff weight or 9 minutes with a 24.8 kg (55 lb) takeoff weight. Released alongside the T30 in China in late-2020 and globally in August 2021.
Agras T20P
Company designation Model 3WWDZ-20A. Model with a 20 L (5.3 US gal) tank, BeiDou compatibility in GNSS mode, a gimballed FPV camera, a phased array omnidirectional RD2484R and backward/downward-looking RD2484B radar, and a pair of LX8060SZ spray nozzles. Powered by a 13000 mAh battery, giving it a hover time of 14.5 minutes with a 32 kg (71 lb) takeoff weight, 7 minutes with a 52 kg (115 lb) takeoff weight, or 6 minutes with a 58 kg (128 lb) takeoff weight. Released alongside the T40 in China in November 2021.
Agras T25
Company designation Model 3WWDZ-20B. Model with a 40 L (11 US gal) tank, a phased array forward-looking RD241608RF and backward-looking RD241608RB radar, and a pair of LX8060SZ spray nozzles. An optional 35 L (9.2 US gal) tank with an internal load of 25 kg (55 lb) for spreading dry fertilizer was also available. Powered by a 15500 mAh DB800 battery. Released alongside the T50 in China in 2022.
Agras T25P
Company designation Model 3WWDZ-20C. Model with an O3 video transmission system two LX07550SX spray nozzles. Powered by a 15500 mAh DB800 battery. Released in China prior to November 2023.
Agras T60
Company designation Model 3WWDZ-50A. Flagship model with new electronic speed controllers (ESC), more powerful motors, a maximum payload of 60 kg (130 lb), and an O4 video transmission system. Powered by a 40000 mAh DB2100 battery. Released in China in November 2023.
Agras T70
Company designation Model 3WWDZ-U50A. Model with a 70 L (18 US gal) tank, but limited to a payload of 50 L (13 US gal) due to its battery size. Released alongside the T70P and T100 in China in November 2024.
Agras T70P
Company designation Model 3WWDZ-U70A. As T70 but with an upgraded battery allowing it to utilize the full tank. Released alongside the T70 and T100 in China in November 2024.

=== Octo-quad variants ===
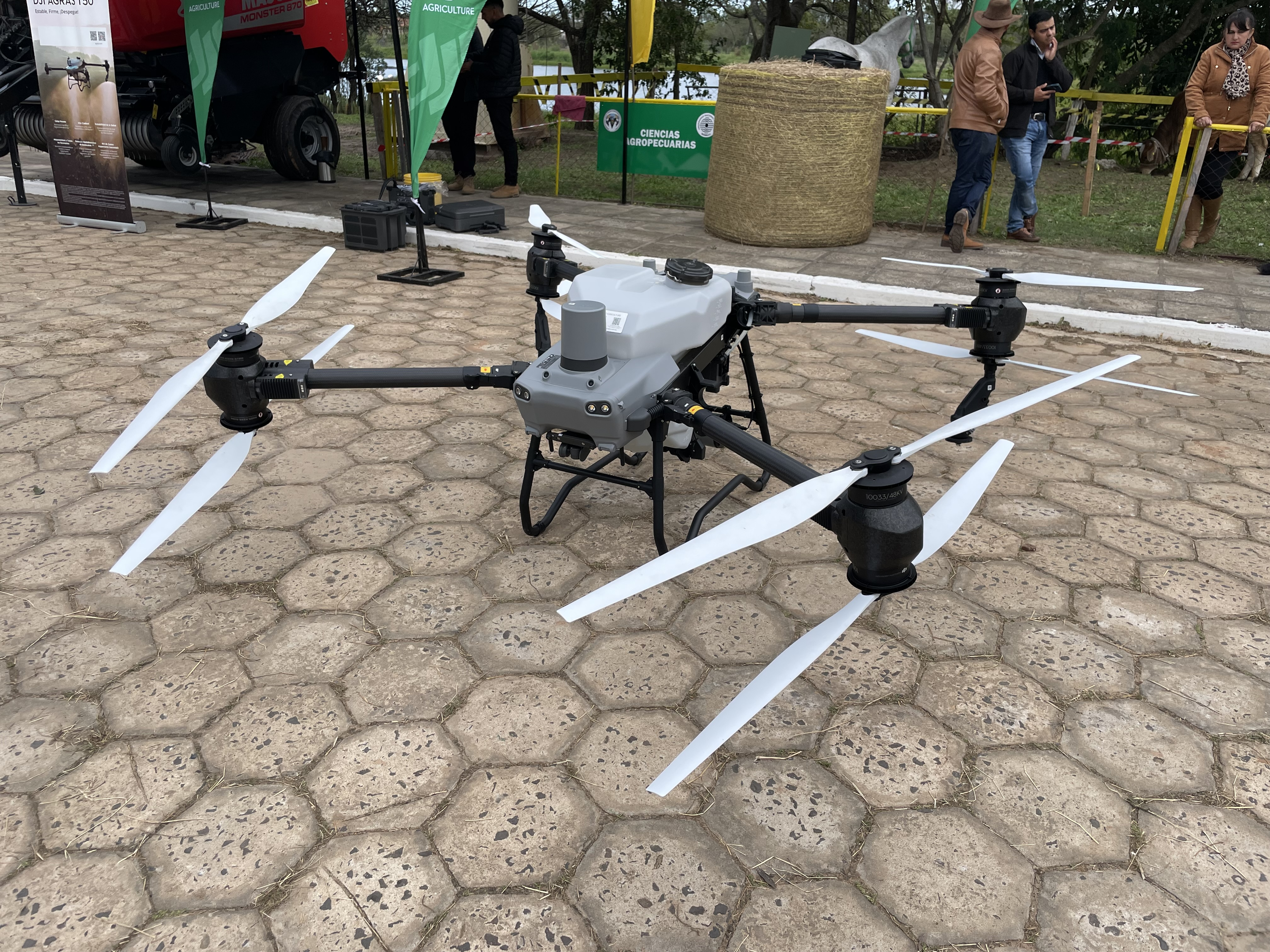
Agras T50 at Universidad Nacional de Pilar

Agras T40
Company designation Model 3WWDZ-40A. Flagship model with a 40 L (11 US gal) tank, BeiDou compatibility in GNSS mode, a gimballed FPV camera, a phased array omnidirectional RD2484R and backward/downward-looking RD2484B radar, and a pair of LX8060SZ spray nozzles. Powered by a 30000 mAh battery giving it a hover time of 18 minutes with a 50 kg (110 lb) takeoff weight, 7 minutes with a 90 kg (200 lb) takeoff weight, or 6 minutes with a 101 kg (223 lb) takeoff weight. Released alongside the T20P in China in November 2021.
Agras T50
Company designation Model 3WWDZ-40B. Model with a 20 L (5.3 US gal) tank, a phased array forward-looking RD241608RF and backward-looking RD241608RB radar, and a pair of LX8060SZ spray nozzles. An optional 75 L (20 US gal) spreading tank with an internal load of 50 kg (110 lb) was also available, and the drone can also be fitted with two additional nozzles for increased flow rate. Powered by a 30000 mAh DB1560 battery. Released alongside the T25 in China in 2022.
Agras T100
Company designation Model 3WWDZ-U75A. Flagship model with a 100 L (26 US gal) tank and new AI flight algorithms. Released alongside the T70 and T70P in China in November 2024.

== Operators ==
=== Military operators ===
Israel

- The Israel Defense Forces has used the Agras, among other DJI models, during the Gaza war. The Agras has been used to drop explosives in Gaza, with one dropping a bomb on an IHH charity building in 2024.

Spain

- The Military Emergencies Unit used the Agras MG-1 for disinfection operations during the COVID-19 pandemic in 2020.

Ukraine

- Ukrainian engineers reportedly modified an Agras T30 to carry a PKM machine gun and a Bullspike-AT grenade launcher in 2024 to defend against the Russian invasion.

== Specifications (Agras T40) ==
Data from

General characteristics

- Capacity: 40 L (11 US gal)/40 kg (88 lb) of fluid or 70 L (18 US gal)/50 kg (110 lb) of solid dry particles
- Length: 2.8 m (9 ft 2 in) unfolded, with propellers
- Width: 3.15 m (10 ft 4 in) unfolded, with propellers
- Height: 0.78 m (2 ft 7 in) unfolded, with propellers
- Empty weight: 50 kg (110 lb) with battery (38 kg (84 lb) without battery)
- Max takeoff weight: 101 kg (223 lb) at sea level
- Battery capacity: 52.22V 30000 mAh

Performance

- Endurance: 18 minutes (no payload)

Avionics

- GNSS compatibility:

- GPS
- Galileo
- BeiDou
- GLONASS

- Radar:

- RD2484R phased array omnidirectional radar
- RD2484B phased array backward/downward-looking radar

== See also ==
- History of unmanned aerial vehicles

Related development

- DJI FlyCart

Related lists

- List of unmanned aerial vehicles
