= Agricultural drone =

Unmanned aerial vehicle

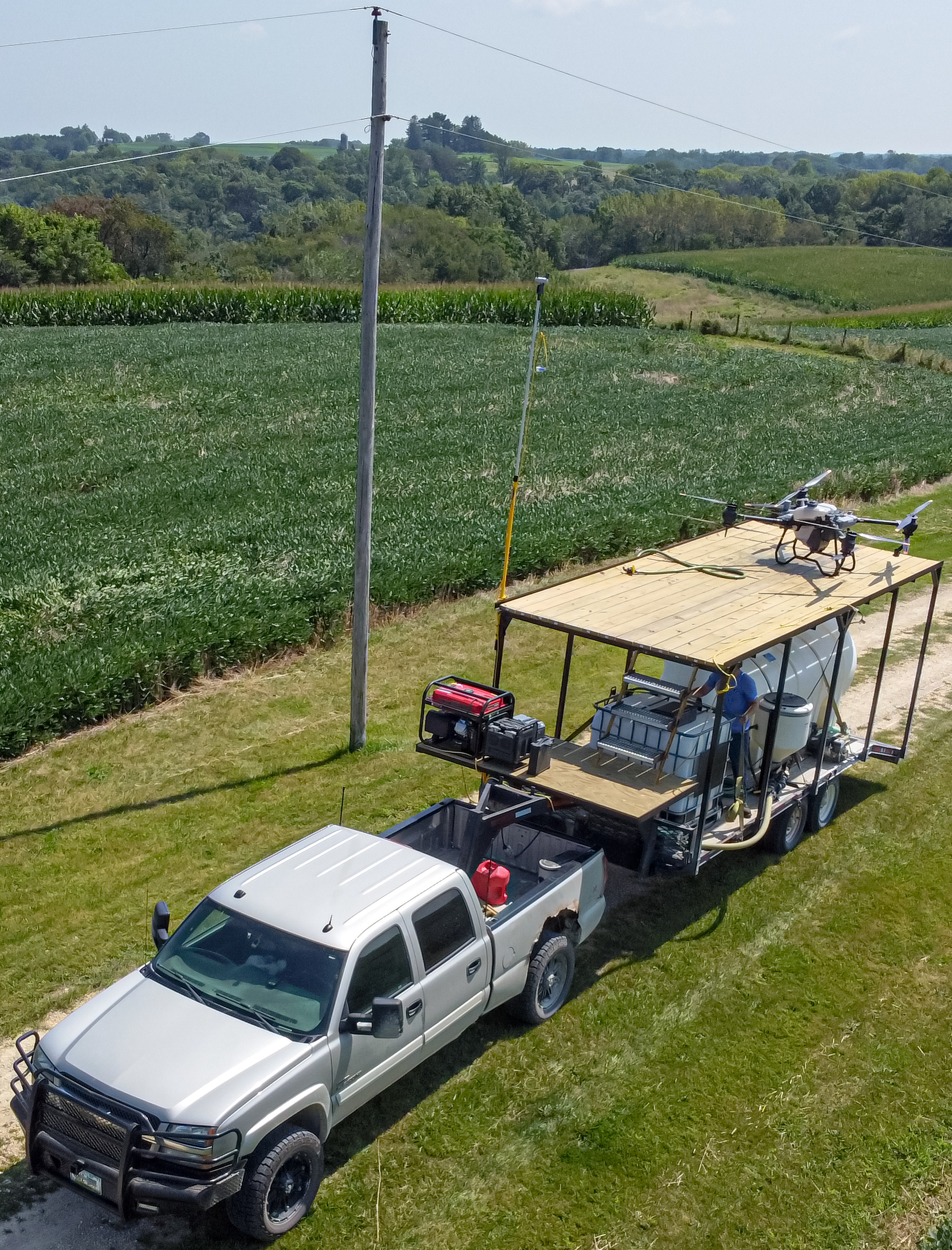
DJI Agras on trailer setup

An agricultural drone is an unmanned aerial vehicle (UAV) used in agriculture operations, mostly in yield optimization by monitoring crop growth, aerial seeding and crop protection. Agricultural drones provide information on crop growth stages, crop health, and soil variations. Multispectral sensors are used on agricultural drones to image electromagnetic radiation beyond the visible spectrum, including near-infrared and short-wave infrared. Agricultural UAVs are often fitted with spray equipment for pesticide application.

== History ==
China entered 2026 with about 309,000 agricultural drones (23% YOY growth) that completed ~203 million hectare-treatments (separately counting repeated treatments of the same land) during 2025. By contrast, US farmers completed ~6.6 million hectare-treatments that year, 3% of China's, despite the fact that the two countries have similar amounts of agricultural land.

== Regulation ==
=== United States ===
As drones entered use in agriculture, the Federal Aviation Administration (FAA) encouraged farmers to use them to monitor their fields. However, with the unexpected boom of agricultural drones, the FAA quickly backpedaled, pending additional regulation. With incidents such as drones crashing into other agricultural aircraft, the FAA and the American Farm Bureau Federation (AFBF) began discussions to agree on regulations that would allow the beneficial use of such drones in a safe and efficient manner.

In 2016, the FAA published rules for commercial drone operation that require commercial drone operators to pass a knowledge exam, register their aircraft, and fly in accordance with published restrictions, later adjusted working with AFBF.

=== Other countries ===
Countries such as India, Malaysia, Singapore and Australia, implemented laws regarding the use of drones, while 15 countries outlawed all drone operations.

== Security and ethics ==
The use of agricultural drones has ethical and social implications. One benefit is that they are able to monitor and control inputs as part of precision agriculture systems, that include minimizing the environmental impact of pesticides. However, in the USA, drones do not require permission to fly over another person's property at altitudes of under 400 feet (120 m). They may have microphones and cameras attached, and the resulting concern for potential privacy violation has caused some opposition towards drones..One other improvement with using drones is the precision that they operate with.

Other companies might start flying their drones in unregulated areas to survey their competition and the condition of their crops and agricultural yield.

== Future use ==
There is a large capacity for growth in the area of agricultural drones. With technology constantly improving, imaging of the crops will need to improve as well. With the data that drones record from the crops the farmers are able to analyze their crops and make educated decisions on how to proceed given the accurate crop information. Software programs for analyzing and correcting crop production have the potential to grow in this market. Farmers will fly a drone over their crops, accurately identify an issue in a specific area, and take the necessary actions to correct the problem. This gives the farmer time to focus on the overall task of production instead of spending time surveying their crops. Additional uses include keeping track of livestock, surveying fences, and monitoring for plant pathogens.

Both the purchase and maintenance costs of modern drones make them too expensive for small farms in developing nations. Pilot programs in Tanzania are focusing on minimizing those costs, producing agricultural drones simple and rugged enough to be repaired locally.

A research team from Washington State University has developed an automated drone system that deters pests like crows or European starlings from feeding on grapes and other crops. The birds could be scared off by the drone's noise, but researchers also could include distress calls and predatory bird noises.

== See also ==
- Aerial seeding
- Agricultural robot
- Environmental monitoring
- Mechanised agriculture
- Precision agriculture
- Delivery drone
