= DJI FlyCart =

Chinese delivery drone

FlyCart
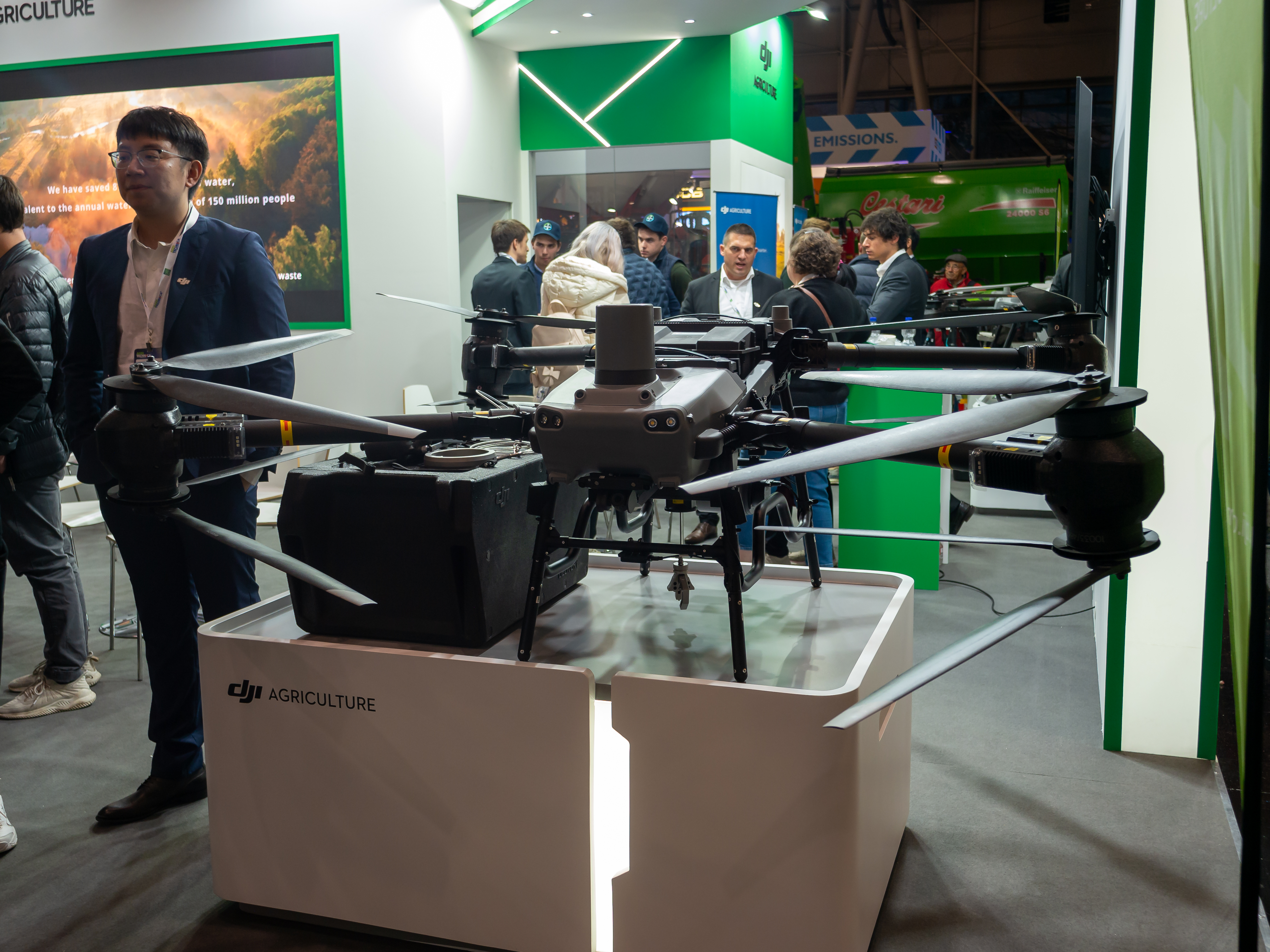
- FlyCart 30 at Agritechnica 2023

General information
- Type: Delivery drone
- National origin: China
- Manufacturer: DJI
- Status: In production

History
- Manufactured: 2023–present
- Introduction date: August 2023
- Developed from: DJI Agras

The DJI FlyCart is a series of delivery drones released by the Chinese technology company DJI.

== Design and development ==
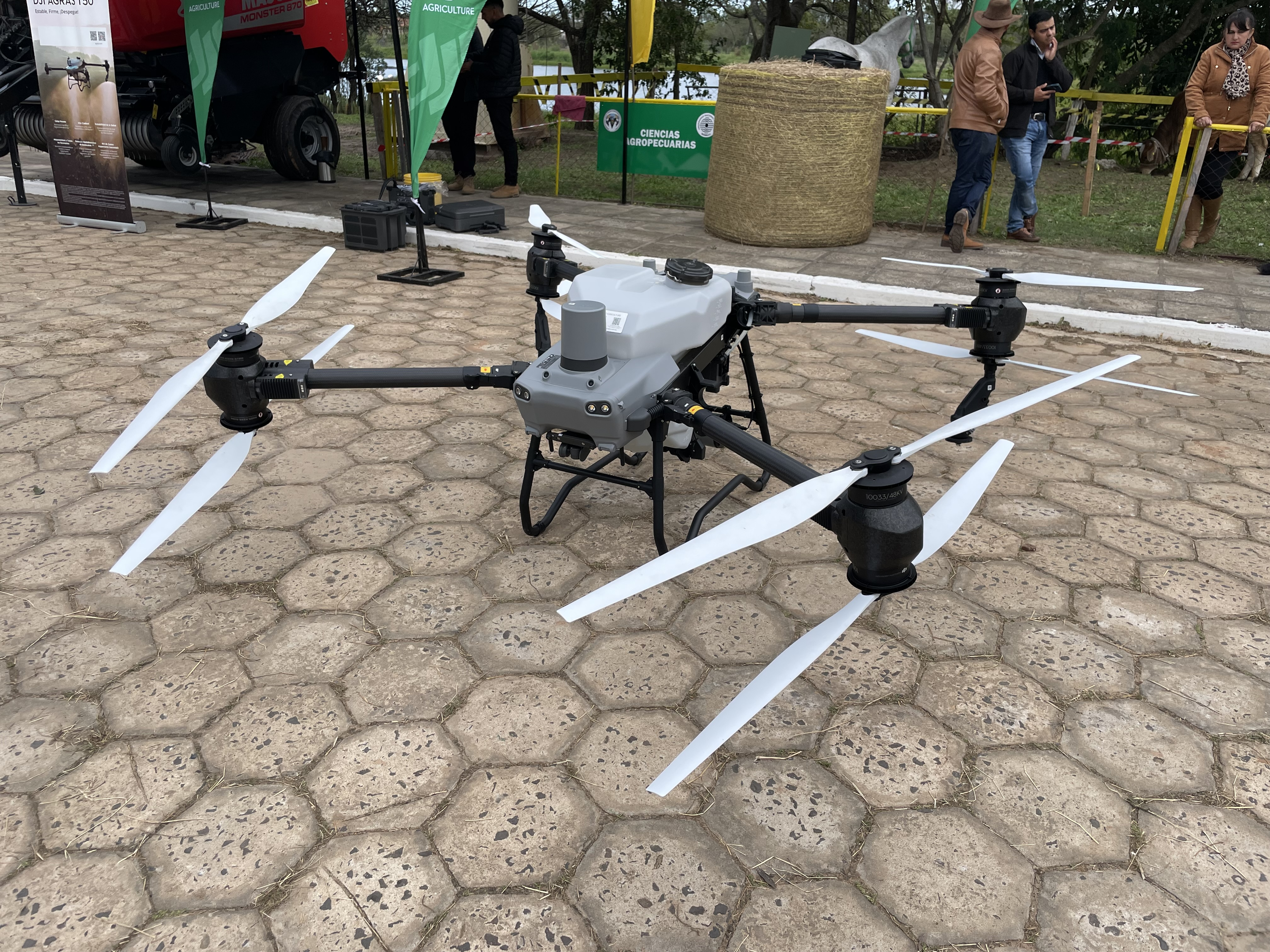
The FlyCart 30 is similar to the Agras T50 agricultural drone.

The first model, the FlyCart 30, was announced by DJI and introduced in China in August 2023, with a global launch following in January 2024. The FlyCart 30, which is similar to the company's Agras T50 agricultural drone, is a folding octo-quad multirotor with eight motors; two mounted on each of its four arms. The drone can carry a 30 kg (66 lb) payload with two batteries installed, though this can be increased to 40 kg (88 lb) with one of the batteries removed. The FlyCart 30's avionics include a visual obstacle avoidance system, forward and backward-looking phased array radars, and an ADS-B receiver. The drone also has an IP55 protection rating and an emergency parachute. Payload delivery can be accomplished using one of two methods; a cargo crate or a winch, the latter designed for scenarios in which the aircraft is unable to land safely. The FlyCart 30 has a gimbal-stabilized camera and an O3 video transmission system. Power is provided by up to two 38000 mAh DB2000 batteries, giving the drone a maximum flight time of 29 minutes unloaded or 18 minutes with a full payload.

A larger model was introduced in June 2025 as the FlyCart 100, which was certified with the FCC alongside the Agras T100. The drone has an increased payload of 80 kg (176 lb) with a single battery or 65 kg (143 lb) with two batteries. The FlyCart 100 has lidar and fisheye lens obstacle avoidance sensors, complementing its visual and radar sensors, and the video transmission system was upgraded to an O4 unit. Power is provided by up to two DB2160 batteries.

== Operational history ==
In April 2024, the DJI conducted a delivery test with FlyCart 30 at Mount Everest. During the test, the drone was used to transport 15 kg (33 lb) of supplies from South Base Camp to Camp 1 in sub-zero conditions before returning with the latter's waste.

In January 2025, the Civil Aviation Authority of New Zealand (CAA) issued a notice to FlyCart 30 and Agras T50 operators about a manufacturing defect that could cause the aircraft's composite arms to delaminate. The CAA advised operators to visually inspect the arms of the aircraft every six months.

== Variants ==
FlyCart 30
Company designation E2MTR-30A. Original model with a payload capacity of 30 kg (66 lb) with two batteries or 40 kg (88 lb) with one battery, forward/downward-looking radars, a visual collision avoidance system, an ADS-B receiver, an IP55 protection rating, an O3 video transmission system, and powered by up to two 38000 mAh DB2000 batteries. Introduced in August 2023.
FlyCart 100
Company designation E2MTR-100A. Improved model with a payload capacity of 65 kg (143 lb) with two batteries or 80 kg (176 lb) with one battery, lidar and fisheye lens obstacle avoidance sensors, an O4 video transmission system, and powered by up to two DB2160 batteries. Introduced in June 2025.

== Specifications (FlyCart 30) ==
Data from

General characteristics

- Capacity: 30 kg (66 lb) with two batteries or 40 kg (88 lb) with one battery
- Length: 1.590 m (5 ft 3 in) (1.115 m (3 ft 7.9 in) folded)
- Width: 1.900 m (6 ft 3 in) (0.760 m (2 ft 5.9 in) folded)
- Height: 0.947 m (3 ft 1 in) (1.027 m (3 ft 4.4 in) folded)
- Empty weight: 42.5 kg (94 lb) without batteries
- Gross weight: 65 kg (143 lb) with two DB2000 batteries
- Max takeoff weight: 95 kg (209 lb)
- Battery: 2× 38000 mAH 52.22 V (1984.4 Wh) 14S1P DB2000 Intelligent Battery
- Powerplant: 8 × 4000 W electric motors
- Propellers: 2-bladed carbon fiber composite propellers, 1.375 m (4 ft 6 in) diameter

Performance

- Maximum speed: 72 km/h (45 mph, 39 kn)
- Endurance: 29 minutes empty or 18 minutes fully loaded (two batteries)
- Service ceiling: 6,000 m (20,000 ft)
- Rate of climb: 5 m/s (980 ft/min)

Avionics

- Camera: 1920×1440 FPV camera
- GNSS compatibility: GPS, BeiDou, Galileo, QZSS
- Transmission system: O3 (Pigeon (with DDR)-2T4R)
- Radar:

- RD241608RF phased array forward-looking radar
- RD241608RB phased array backward-looking radar

== See also ==
Related development

- DJI Agras

Aircraft of comparable role, configuration, and era

- Flytrex FTX-M600P
