= Chengdu J-7 =

Chinese version of the Soviet MiG-21

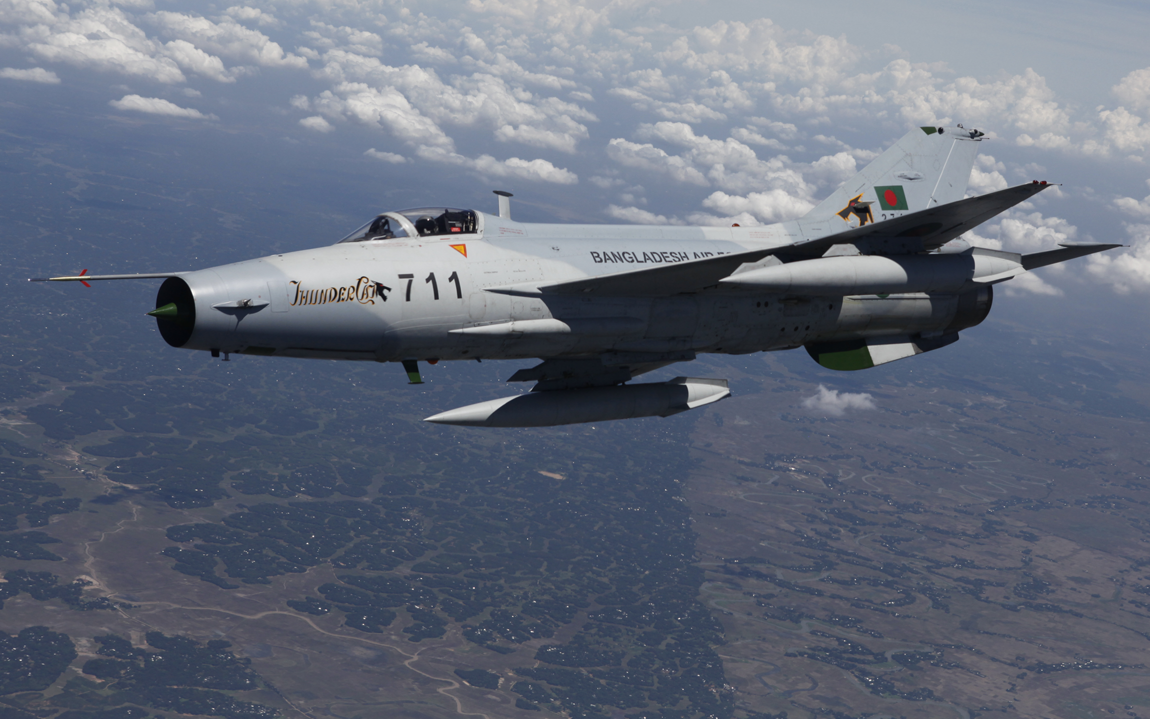
- A Bangladesh Air Force J-7BGI in 2017

General information
- Type: Fighter aircraft
- Manufacturer: Chengdu Aircraft Corporation/Guizhou Aircraft Industry Corporation
- Status: In service
- Primary users: People's Liberation Army Air Force (historical) Bangladesh Air Force; Korean People's Air Force; Pakistan Air Force
- Number built: 2,400+

History
- Manufactured: 1965–2013
- Introduction date: 17 January 1966
- First flight: January 17, 1966; 60 years ago
- Developed from: Mikoyan-Gurevich MiG-21
- Developed into: Guizhou JL-9

The Chengdu J-7 (Chinese: 歼-7; pinyin: Jiān-7; third generation export version F-7; NATO reporting name: Fishcan) is a Chinese fighter aircraft. It is a license-built derivative of the Soviet Mikoyan-Gurevich MiG-21, and thus shares many similarities with that aircraft. The J-7 is armed with infrared homing air-to-air missiles and is mainly designed for short range air-to-air combat. The aircraft is also used for close air support.

On 30 March 1962, the Soviet Union and China signed a technology transference arrangement on the MiG-21. Allegedly, while various kits, components, completed aircraft and associated documents were delivered to the Shenyang Aircraft Factory, the design documentation was incomplete, and Chinese designers made efforts to reverse engineer the aircraft. While the two aircraft are greatly similar, areas of difference include the hydraulic systems and internal fuel arrangements. During March 1964, domestic production of the J-7 reportedly commenced at the Shenyang Aircraft Factory, but due to various factors including the Cultural Revolution, mass production was only truly achieved during the 1980s. Numerous models of the J-7 were developed, featuring improvements in areas such as the armament, avionics, and wing design.

The aircraft was primarily operated by the People's Liberation Army Air Force (PLAAF), but numerous international operators have bought their own J-7s. Outside of China, the largest operator of the J-7 is the Pakistan Air Force. Later generation Chinese aircraft, such as the Shenyang J-8 interceptor, were developed with the lessons learned from the J-7 programme. Several nations, including Zimbabwe, Tanzania, and Sri Lanka, deployed the type in offensive roles.

In 2013, production of the J-7 was terminated after the delivery of 16 F-7BGI to the Bangladesh Air Force. Newer fighter aircraft, such as the JF-17 Thunder, Chengdu J-10, and Shenyang J-35A multirole fighters, have succeeded it in the export market. To date, large numbers of J-7s remain in service with multiple export customers, with the PLAAF retiring the fleet in 2023.

== Design and development ==
=== Background ===
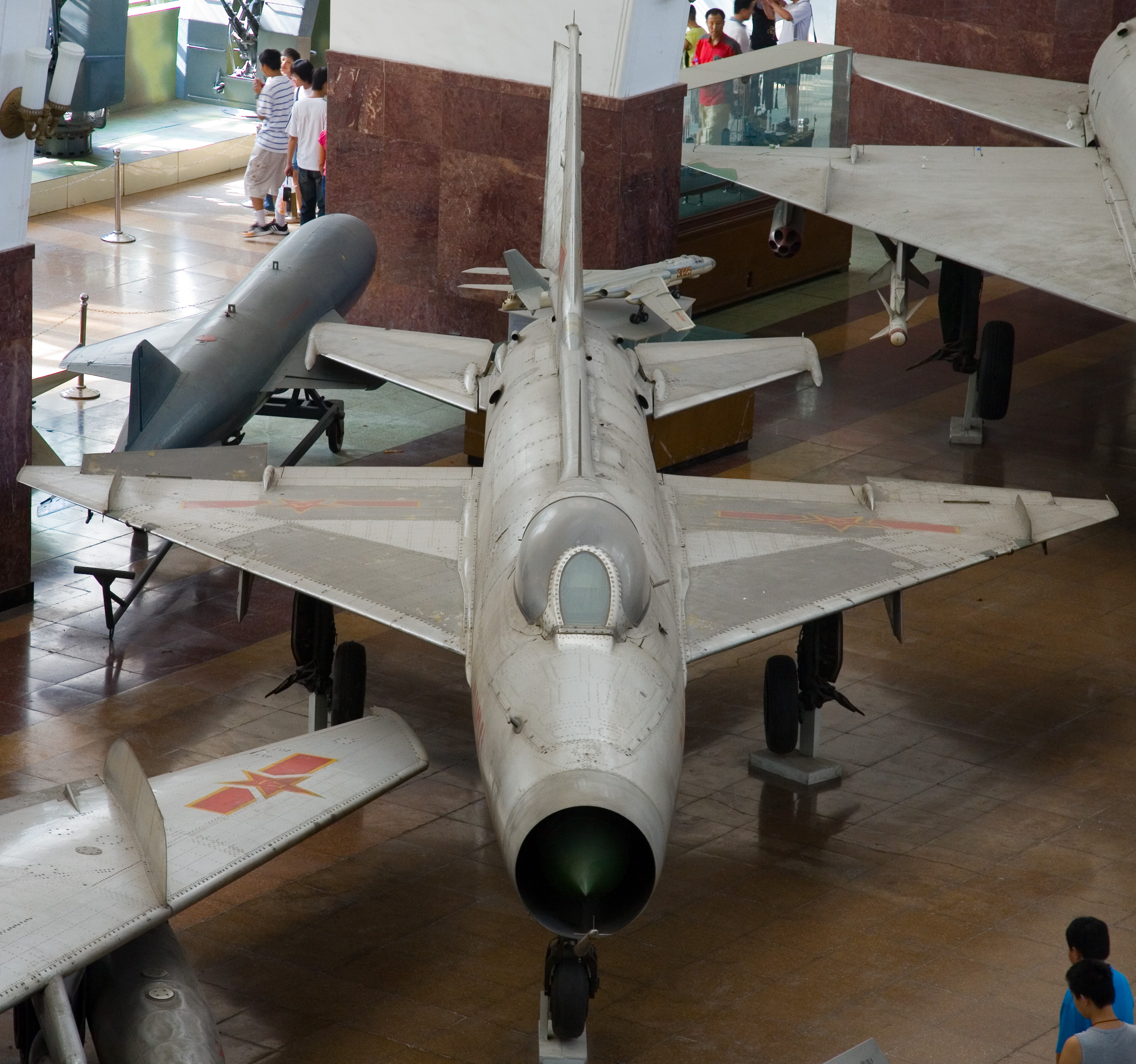
A PLAAF J-7I at the Beijing Military museum

In the 1950s and early 1960s, the Soviet Union shared a large proportion of its conventional weapons technology with its neighbor, China. One such example is the MiG-19, which was locally produced by China as the Shenyang J-6 from as early as 1958. During the same decade, the even more capable MiG-21 had been developed by the Soviets; this fighter, being inexpensive but fast, suited the strategy of forming large groups of 'people's fighters' to overcome the technological advantages of Western aircraft. However, the Sino-Soviet split abruptly ended initial cooperation efforts; between 28 July and 1 September 1960, the Soviet Union withdrew its advisers from China, resulting in the J-7 project coming to a halt in China.

During February 1962, Soviet Premier Nikita Khrushchev unexpectedly wrote to Mao Zedong to inform him that the Soviet Union was willing to transfer MiG-21 technology to China, and he asked the Chinese to promptly send their representatives to the Soviet Union to discuss arrangements. The Chinese viewed this offer as a Soviet gesture to make peace, and while suspicious, they were nonetheless eager to take up the Soviet offer of an aircraft deal. A delegation headed by General Liu Yalou, the commander-in-chief of the People's Liberation Army Air Force (PLAAF) and himself a Soviet military academy graduate, was dispatched to Moscow immediately; the Chinese delegation was given three days to visit the MiG-21's production facility, which was previously off-limits to foreigners. The visit's authorization was personally given by Nikita Khrushchev, and on 30 March 1962, the technology transfer deal was signed.

=== Establishing production ===
However, given the state of political relations between the two countries, the Chinese were not optimistic about gaining the technology, and allegedly made preparations to reverse engineer the aircraft. Russian sources state that several complete MiG-21s were sent to China, flown by Soviet pilots, while MiG-21Fs in kit form were also sent along with parts and technical documents. As the Chinese had expected, following the delivery of kits, parts and documents to Shenyang Aircraft Factory five months after the deal was signed, it was discovered that some technical documents provided by the Soviets were incomplete and that several parts could not be used.

China set about to engineer the aircraft for local production; in doing so, they successfully solved 249 major issues and reproduced eight major technical documents that were not provided by the Soviet Union. One of the major flaws was with the hydraulic systems, which grounded up to 70% of some squadron's aircraft until upgrades were made. Another major modification was to the fuel storage, increasing the aircraft's stability. The MiG-21 carries most of its fuel in the forward fuselage, causing the center of gravity to shift and become unstable after about 45 minutes of operation. The J-7 has redesigned fuel tanks and significantly larger drop tanks in order to maintain a more stable center of gravity, and therefore better longitudinal static stability. The cockpit was also revised to replace the Soviet ejection seat, which was deemed to be unacceptable. The forward opening canopy was replaced by a standard rear-hinged canopy, which was jettisoned prior to ejection. The re-engineering effort was largely successful, as the Chinese-built J-7 showed only minor differences in design and performance from the original MiG-21.

During March 1964, domestic production of the J-7 reportedly commenced at the Shenyang Aircraft Factory. However, mass production efforts were severely hindered by the Cultural Revolution, which resulted in poor initial quality and slow progress. Achieving full domestic production had involved not only the local assembly of the aircraft itself, but the production of its various components and systems, including its turbojet powerplant. As a consequence, full-scale production of the J-7 was only truly achieved during the 1980s, by which time the original aircraft design was showing its age. By the 1980s, quantity production of the General Dynamics F-16 Fighting Falcon fighter was well underway in the United States; this relatively-affordable single-engined western fighter was considerably more agile than the J-7, even with the former carrying a greater payload.

=== Further development ===
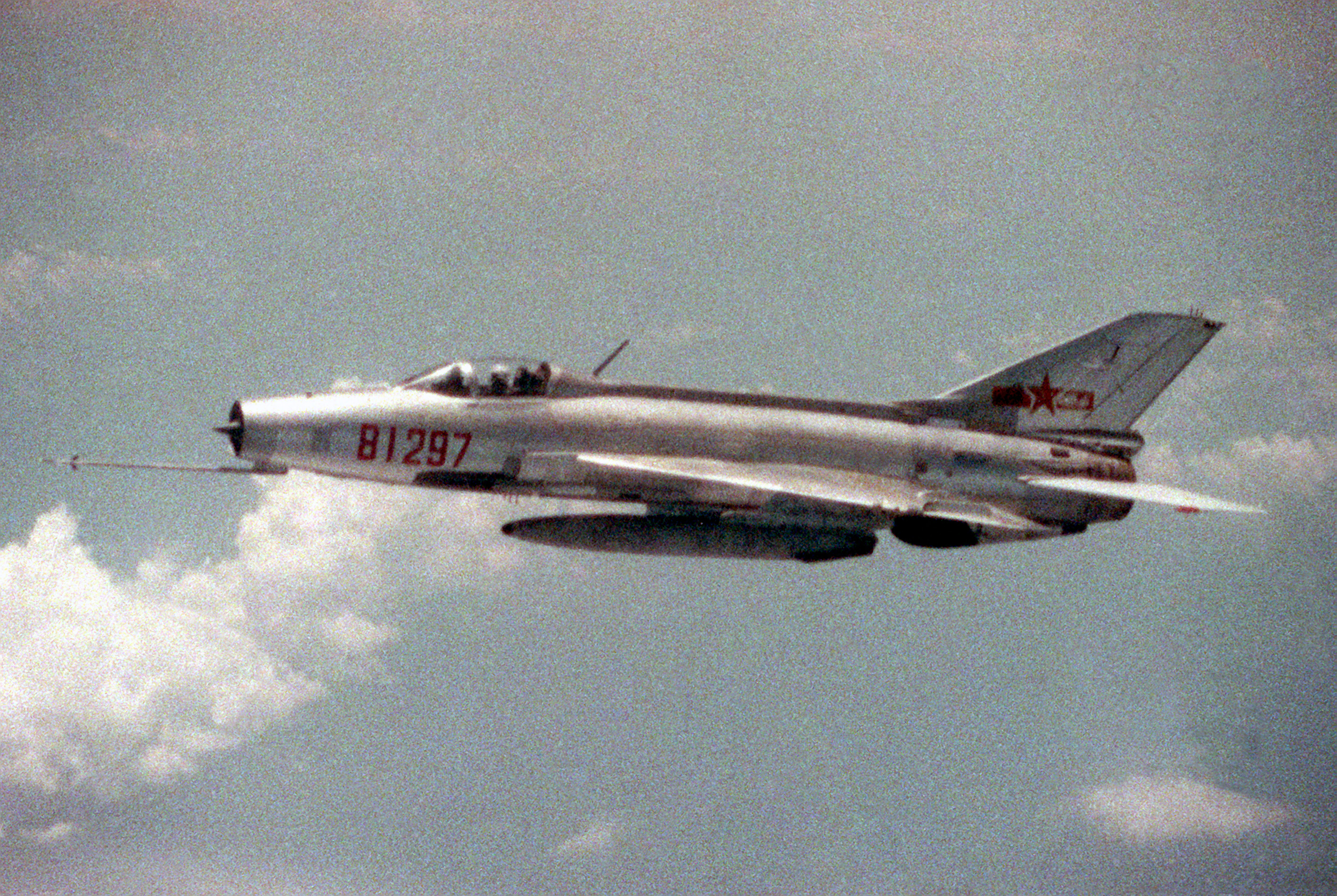
A PLAAF J-7III in the 1990s

In 1987, the J-7E was introduced, having a greatly improved wing, among other improvements. It was roughly 45% more maneuverable, and its takeoff and landing performance was greatly increased. It was also equipped with a helmet mounted sight, as well as being the first MiG-21 variant to be equipped with HOTAS and a multipurpose display. Many of the electronic components were British in origin, such as the gun sight and the multi purpose display. The aircraft is capable of using PL-8/Python 3 missiles with both the helmet mounted sight or the radar fire control, but the two are not connected. The pilot may use only one system at a time.

In the mid-1980s, Pakistan requested an aircraft with greater radar capabilities. Both the standard radar and the British Marconi radar were plagued by ground clutter, but China did not have any experience with air to ground radar at the time. In 1984, Pakistan provided assistance by having their American-trained F-16 pilots provide training on proper ground attack radar operation, which enabled the Chinese to develop the J-7M. In the late 1980s, the J-7MP and J-7PG introduced significant upgrades to the radar system by converting to an Italian FIAR Grifo-7 radar, more than tripled the effective range of the radar, as well as greatly increased the maximum angle for target detection.

The J-7 only reached its Soviet-designed capabilities in the mid-1980s. Being relatively affordable, it was widely exported as the F-7, often with Western systems incorporated, such as to Pakistan. There are over 20 different export variants of the J-7, some of which are equipped to use European weaponry, such as French R.550 Magic missiles. The Discovery Channel's Wings Over The Red Star series claims that the Chinese intercepted several Soviet MiG-21s en route to North Vietnam (during the Vietnam War), but these aircraft did not perform in a manner consistent with their original specifications, suggesting that the Chinese actually intercepted down-rated aircraft that were intended for export, rather than fully capable production aircraft. For this reason, the Chinese had to re-engineer the intercepted MiG-21 airframes in order to achieve their original capabilities. China later developed the Shenyang J-8 based both on the expertise gained by the program, and by utilizing the incomplete technical information acquired from the Soviet Ye-152 developmental jet.

During May 2013, production of the J-7 was permanently terminated, bringing to a close a period of manufacturing stretching almost 50 years.

At the China International Aviation & Aerospace Exhibition in 2018, a display showing the J-7 as an unmanned platform was shown.

== Operational history ==
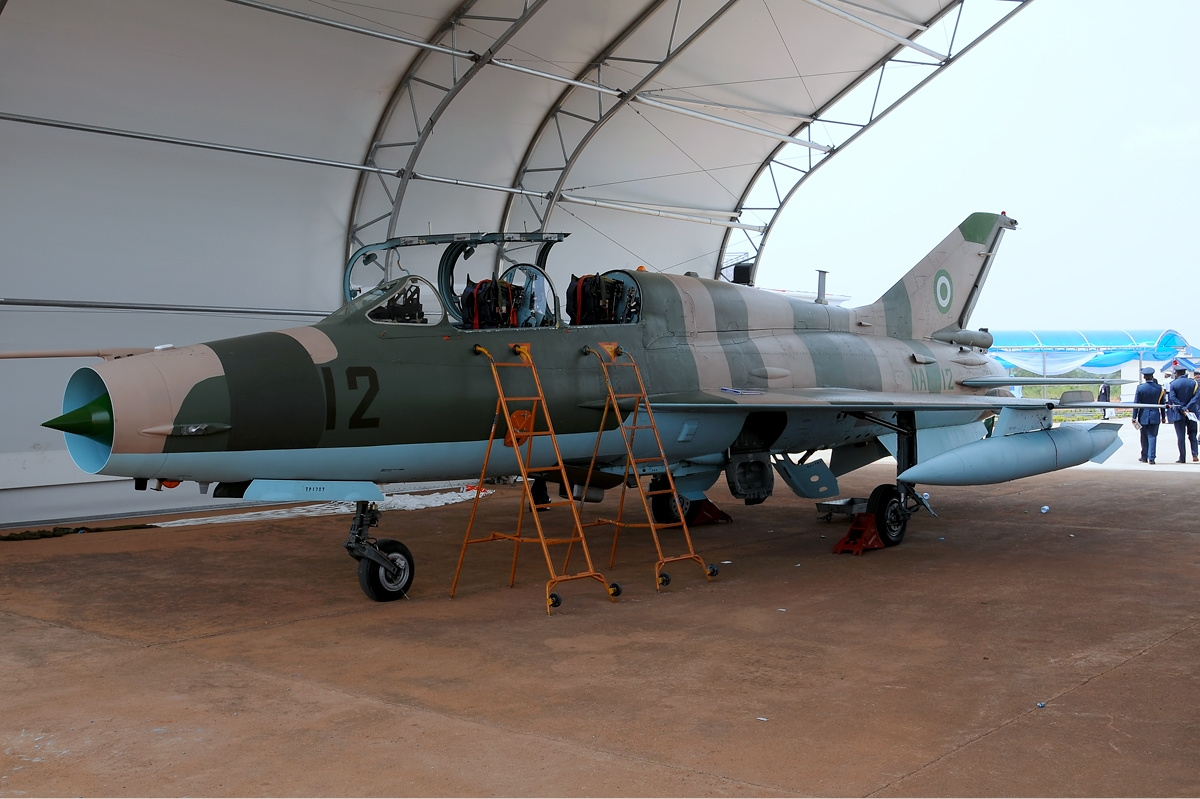
A Nigerian FT-7NI

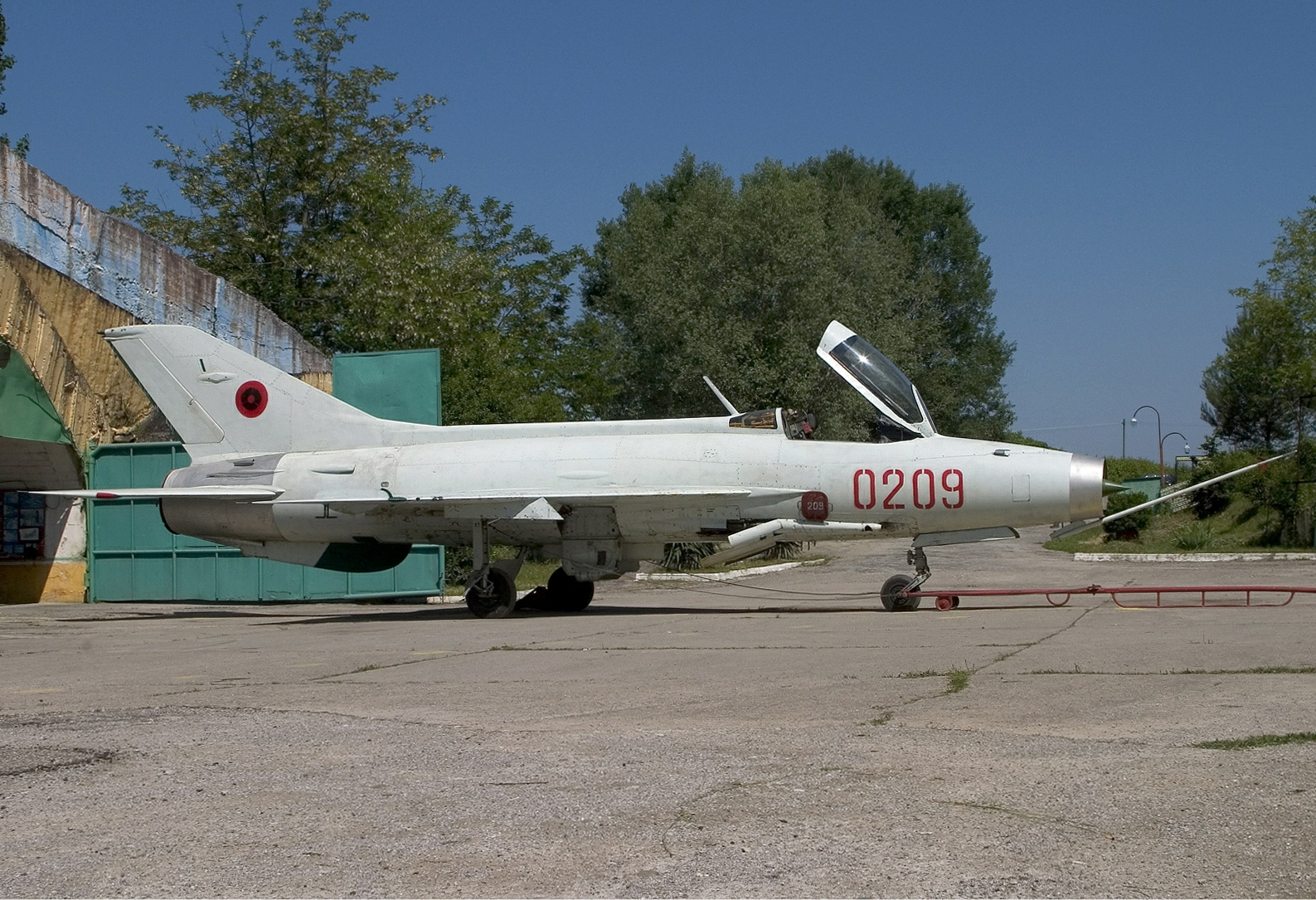
Albanian Air Force Chengdu F-7A

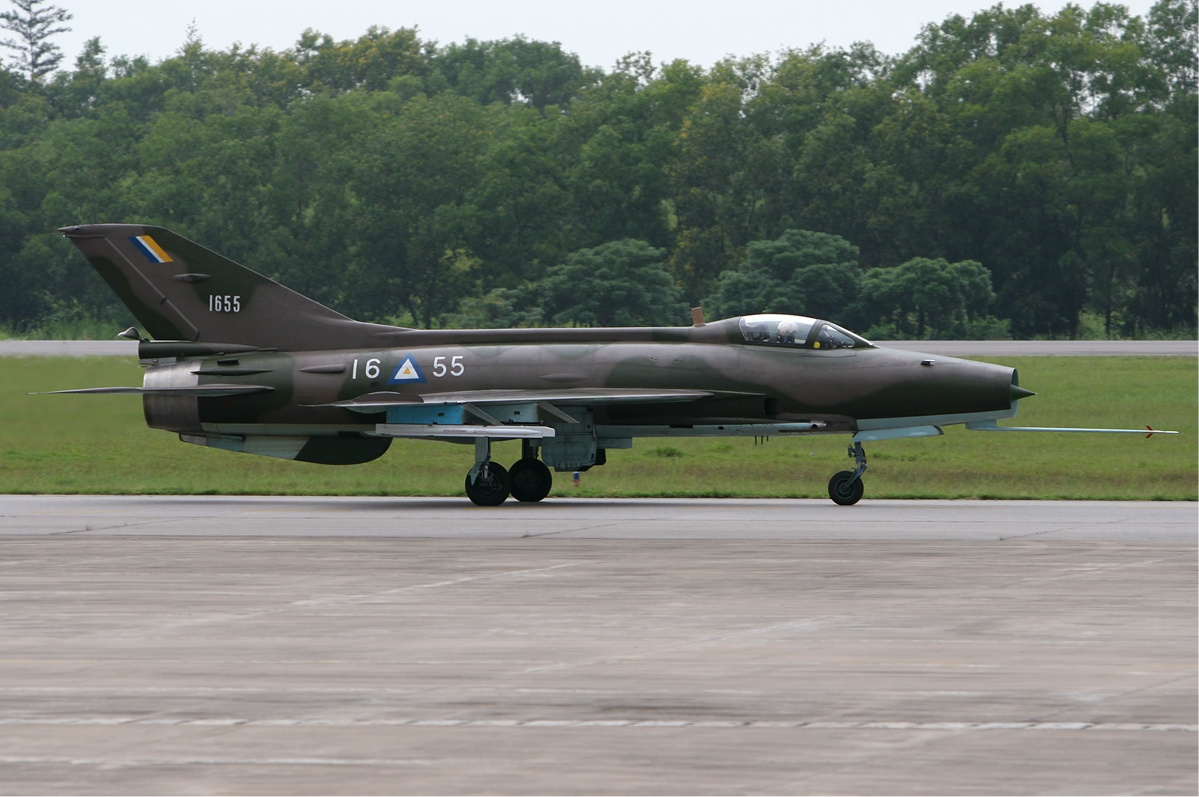
Myanmar Air Force Chengdu F-7M

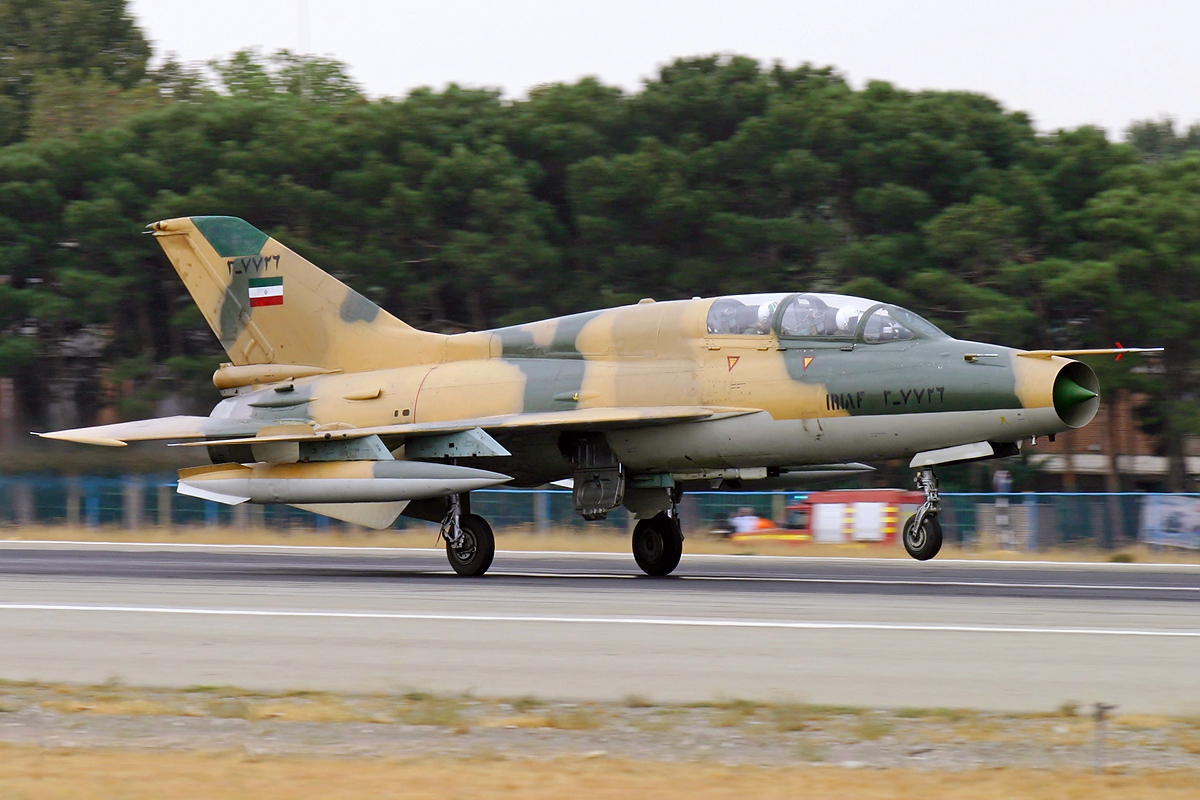
Islamic Republic of Iran Air Force Chengdu FT-7 landing at Mehrabad International Airport

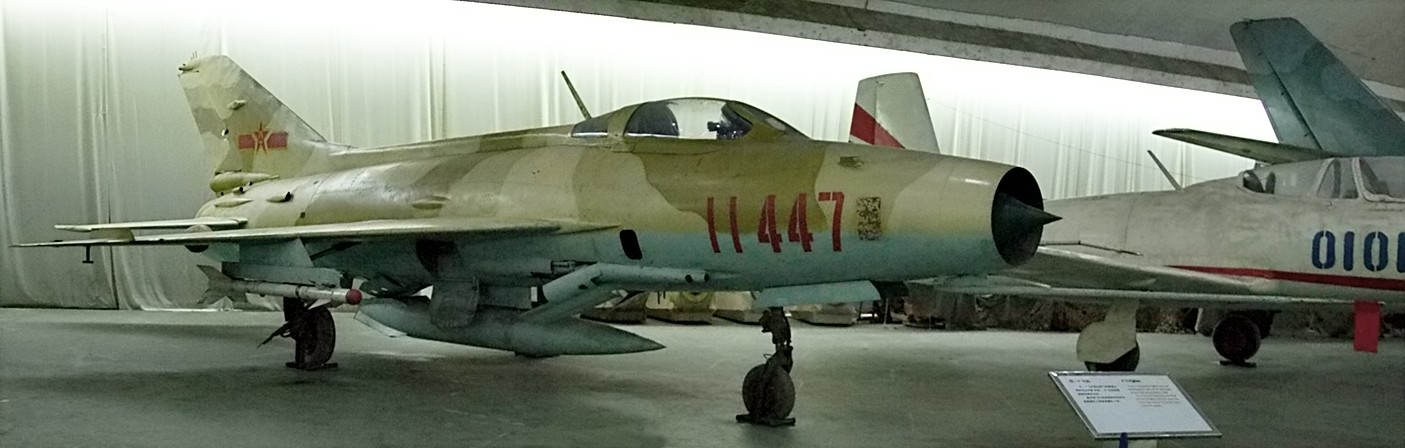
A J-7I on display at the Chinese Aviation Museum. Note the underwing PL-2 missiles

=== Africa ===
==== Namibia ====
During August 2005, Namibia ordered 12 F-7NMs for its air force; Chinese sources reported the delivery in November 2006. The model procured is believed to be a variation of the F-7PG acquired by Pakistan with Grifo MG radar.

==== Nigeria ====
In early 2008, Nigeria procured 12 F-7NI fighters and three FT-7NI trainers to replace its existing inventory of MiG-21 fighters. On 20 September 2018, a pair of Nigerian F-7Nis crashed in Katamkpehir, Abuja, killing one pilot after a mid-air collision during a rehearsal of an aerial display for the 58th anniversary of Nigeria's independence.

==== Sudan ====
During the lengthy Second Sudanese Civil War, Sudan procured a number of F-7s. In November 1993, it was reported that Iran had allegedly financed Sudan's purchase of around 20 Chinese ground-attack aircraft, having pledged $17 million in financial aid to the Sudanese government and arranged for $300 million in Chinese arms to be delivered to the Sudanese Army.

Tanzania

The Tanzanian Air Force deployed its F-7As during the Uganda–Tanzania War against Uganda and Libya, which was fought between 1978 and 1979. Forming a major component of Tanzania's combat aircraft, the type facilitated the defeat of the nominally stronger Uganda Army Air Force during the air campaign.

Zimbabwe

Due to their very limited operational capabilities in the absence of ground support from radars, Zimbabwean F-7s were never used in combat operations during the Second Congo War. Their only deployment in the DR Congo took place in January 2001, when four aircraft were to participate in the burial ceremony for the assassinated president, Laurent-Désiré Kabila. During the journey from Zimbabwe to Kinshasa, one of them crashed, with its pilot ejecting safely. Moreover, on the return trip, two aircraft were damaged on landing, although both were repaired and returned to service.

=== Europe ===
==== Albania ====
During the communist era, deployment of F-7As and other Chinese-built aircraft helped check regular incursions by the Yugoslav Air Force into Albanian airspace. The entire fixed-wing inventory was permanently grounded in 2005 due to budget issues and the improved security environment, with Albania joining NATO in 2009.

=== East and Southeast Asia ===
==== China ====
Throughout the mid-1990s, the PLAAF began to replace its J-7B inventory with the substantially redesigned and improved J-7E variant. The wings of the J-7E have a new "double delta" design offering improved aerodynamics and increased fuel capacity, and the J-7E also features a more powerful engine and improved avionics. The newest version of the J-7, the J-7G, entered service with the PLAAF in 2003.

The principal role of the J-7 in Chinese service is to provide local air defense and tactical air superiority. Large numbers are to be employed to deter enemy air operations.

In June 2021, four J-7s participated in a combat drill conducted near Taiwan's air defense identification zone.

The decommissioning of the J-7 began in 2018, with the whole fleet set to retire in 2023. According to the US Air Force China Aerospace Studies Institute, the retirement of J-7 marked the PLAAF's transition to a fleet composed of only fourth-generation and fifth-generation aircraft. According to the Chinese media, PLAAF also considered turning J-7 into drones for training tools and aerial decoys.

==== Myanmar ====
During the 1990s, Myanmar reportedly established four squadrons of F-7s, which have been primarily used for air defense duties. Technical difficulties have reportedly plagued the fleet early on, and their ground-attack performance was not deemed sufficient. Since then, Myanmar has improved the F-7 fleet's capabilities via a modernisation programme. A series of upgrades were allegedly performed by a combination of Chinese and Israeli enterprises; although confirmed details on the arrangements have remained sparse, changes reportedly include the adoption of various Israeli-built missiles.

=== Middle East ===
==== Iran ====
During the 1980s, Iran procured a number of F-7s, despite Chinese officials issuing denials of directly supplying military equipment to the country at that time. Despite its use as a frontline fighter, the type has not been involved in any known air to air combat actions. By the 21st century, it was largely relegated to use as a trainer aircraft. The F-7 has also been used as a flying test bed for various indigenous technologies. In the recent years, maintaining the fleet's operational status has reportedly become difficult. This is caused by the limited availability of spare parts, despite efforts by domestic industries to fill in, but also by the age of the airframes, which have accumulated excessive numbers of flight hours.

Iranian F-7s have featured in several movies, often portraying Iraqi MiG-21s during the Iran–Iraq War. One tells the story of an Islamic Republic of Iran Air Force strike on the Iraqi nuclear reactor at Osirak on 30 September 1980. Another one, "Attack on H3", tells the story of the 810 km-deep raid against Iraqi Air Force airfields on 4 April 1981.

===== 2026 Iran war =====
During the 2026 Iran war, Iranian J-7s were targeted by coalition forces on the ground in their airbases with two strikes known where a total of 10 were destroyed (As of 8 April 2026). The first of these was on the 7 March 2026, when Israeli Airforce strikes on the Isfahan Shahid Beheshti International Airport (which hosts the IRIAF) were visually confirmed by observers using satellite imagery and with footage released by the IAF to have destroyed 9 to 10 J-7s on the ground (alongside three Grumman F-14 Tomcats). The second confirmed strike was on the 21 March 2026 where a single J-7 was destroyed by USAF/CENTCOM strikes on Shahid Sadooghi Airport in Yazd Province.

==== Iraq ====
20 J-7Bs were initially constructed between 1981 and 1982 for delivery to Jordan by the Third Ministry of Machine, with the first flight of these aircraft taking place in May 1982. 60 F-7Ms transferred from Jordan in a similar way to Iraq in 1985. Iraqi F-7Bs were never officially used in combat, but only as advanced trainers. In 1988, Jordan also acquired JJ-7 trainers and delivered them to Iraq. By 1999, only about 32 to 34 were operational, with a lack of parts and support, and were mainly used as weapons training platforms. They were withdrawn from service after the 2003 Invasion of Iraq and subsequent dissolution of the old Iraqi forces.

=== South Asia ===
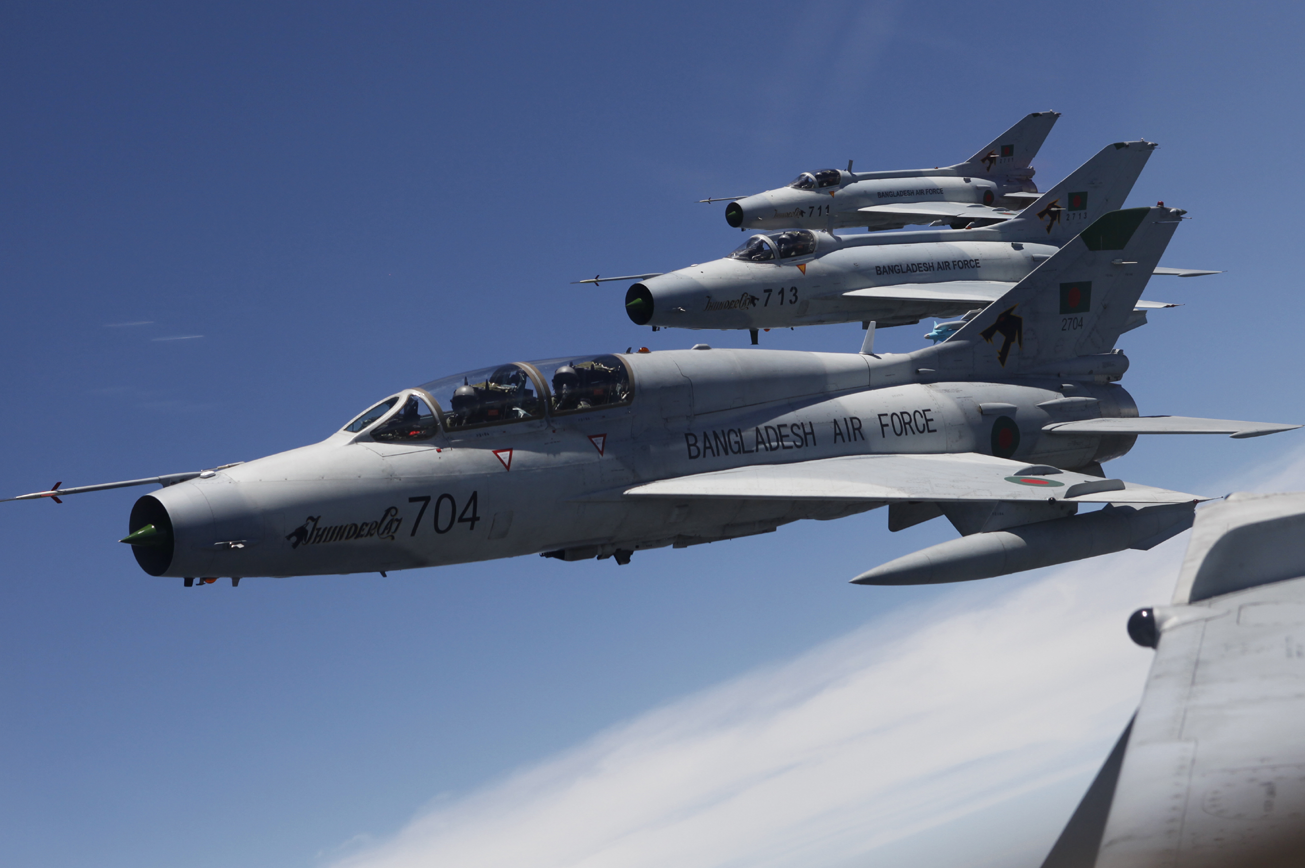
Bangladesh Air Force twin-seater FT-7BGI inflight with F-7BGI's

==== Bangladesh ====
The Bangladeshi Air Force currently operates FT-7MB Airguards, and F-7BG and F-7BGI interceptors. The F-7BGI is one of the most advanced variants, and the last production model of the F-7/J-7 family, with 16 entering service in 2013.

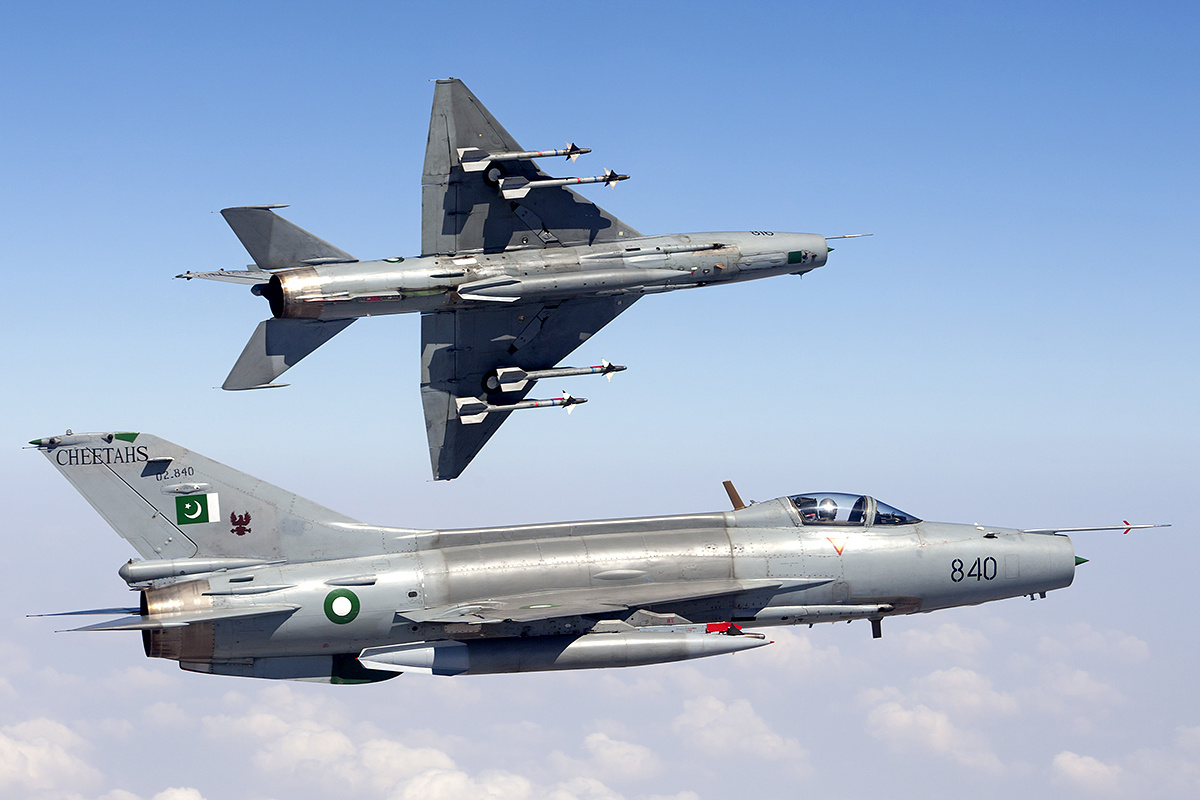
Pakistan Air Force F-7PG No. 20 Squadron "Cheetahs"

==== Pakistan ====
During the 1980s, Pakistan launched Project Sabre II in an effort to increase the effectiveness of its F-7 fleet by redesigning and upgrading the airframe. The program produced to a design study which was drawn up by engineers from Northrop Grumman, China and Pakistan, but by 1989, the project was abandoned largely as a consequence of economic sanctions that the U.S. imposed on Pakistan. That same year, Grumman and China initiated a new design study in another attempt to redesign the F-7 but that effort was also abandoned when the U.S. placed sanctions on China in response to the 1989 Tiananmen Square protests. In 1991, a third initiative involving the F-7 was launched; originally known as the Fighter China project, it led to the creation of the JF-17 Thunder multirole fighter. The aircraft satisfied a requirement issued by the Pakistani Air Force for an affordable and modern combat aircraft, and the country is in the process of replacing its entire F-7 fleet with JF-17s.

==== Sri Lanka ====
In 1991, the Sri Lanka Air Force (SLAF) was looking for a jet attack aircraft to provide fast close air support to its army. With western countries refusing to sell attack aircraft, the Government of Sri Lanka approached China for the purchase of several Nanchang Q-5s, which had the range and payload capacity needed by the SLAF, and was already used by Pakistan and Bangladesh. Due to pressure from the west, China agreed to sell a small number of F-7BS fighters which allowed the SLAF to restore its capabilities that were lost a decade back. Due to the type's comparative lack of endurance and payload, the SLAF has periodically used its F-7s for pilot training purposes. Early in 2008, the air force received six more advanced F-7Gs, to use primarily as interceptors. All of the F-7Gs, F-7BS' and FT-7s are flown by the No 5 Jet Squadron.

The SLAF has repeatedly deployed its F-7BS to conduct ground-attack missions against the Liberation Tigers of Tamil Eelam (LTTE). Sri Lankan officials reported that on 9 September 2008, three F-7s were scrambled after two rebel-flown Zlín-143s were detected by a ground radar. Two F-7s were sent to bomb two rebel airstrips in the Mullaitivu and Kilinochchi areas, while the third reportedly intercepted one Zlín-143. According to the Sri Lankan government, the rebel-flown aircraft was shot down by the chasing F-7G using an air-to-air missile, as it was returning to Mullaitivu after a bombing run against Vavuniya Airport.

== Operators ==
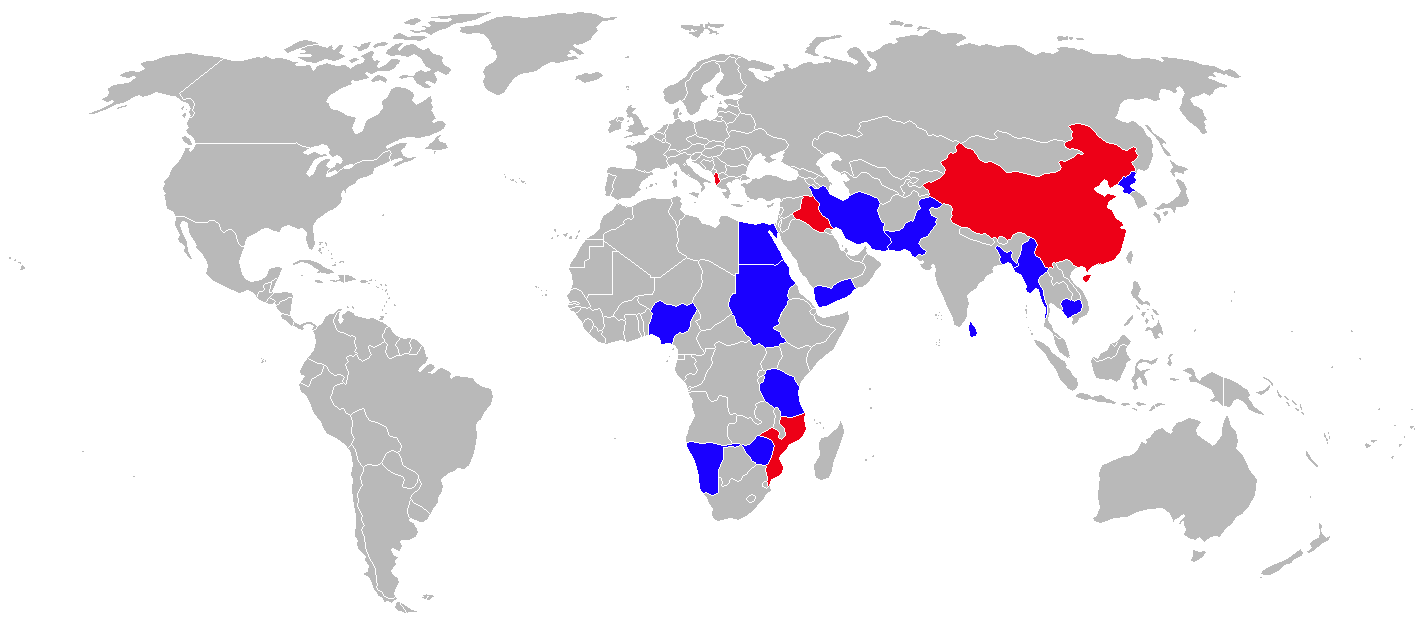
Operators Current Former

=== Current ===
Bangladesh

- Bangladesh Air Force: 20 aircraft delivered between 1989 and 1990, with an additional 20 aircraft delivered between 1999 and 2006. 16 F-7BGI delivered between 2012 and 2013. 36 F-7 fighters and 10 FT-7 trainers listed as active in 2025.

Iran

- Islamic Republic of Iran Air Force: 11 F-7s and 1 FT-7 in service as of 2023. 10 destroyed during the 2026 Iran War.

Myanmar

- Myanmar Air Force: 64 aircraft were received between 1990 and 1999. 36 F-7M and F-7IIK and 6 FT-7 trainers remained in service (As of February 2012).

Namibia

- Namibian Air Force: 6 × F-7NM and 2 × FT-7NM in active service. A total of 12 F/FT-7NM aircraft were delivered between 2006 and 2008.

Nigeria

- Nigerian Air Force: 12 × F-7 and 2 × FT-7.

North Korea

- North Korean Air Force: As of February 2026, 30 F-7 remained in service. However, reports of dire levels of serviceability suggest an airworthiness rate of less than 50%.

Pakistan

- Pakistan Air Force: As of 2025, 72 × F-7 and 21 × FT-7
  - 2 Squadron, PAF Base Masroor, F-7P - (1990–2015)
  - 15 Squadron, F-7P - (1993–1997)
  - 17 Squadron, PAF Base Peshawar, F-7PG
  - 18 Squadron, PAF Base Minhas, F-7P - (1989–2020)
  - 19 Squadron, PAF Base Rafiqui, F-7P - (1991–2014)
  - 20 Squadron, PAF Base M. M. Alam, F-7PG
  - 23 Squadron, PAF Base Mushaf, F-7PG
  - 25 Squadron, F-7P - (1991–1996)
  - Combat Commanders School, PAF Base Mushaf, F-7P - (1993–2021)

Sri Lanka

- Sri Lankan Air Force: As of January 2022, 5 F-7GS/BS and 1 FT-7 trainer remained in service.

Sudan

- Sudanese Air Force: 20 F-7 fighters in service as of October 2023.

Tanzania

- Tanzanian Air Force: Originally having had 11 × F-7 in service, Tanzania replaced them with 12 new J-7's (single-seat) under the designation J-7G and 2 dual-seat aircraft designated F-7TN in 2011. Originally ordered in 2009, the deliveries were completed and the aircraft are now fully operational at the air bases in Dar es Salaam and Mwanza. The new aircraft are equipped with a KLJ-6E Falcon radar, thought to be developed from the Selex Galileo Grifo 7 radar. The J-7G's primary weapon is the Chinese PL-7A short-range infrared air-to-air missile.

Zimbabwe

- Air Force of Zimbabwe: 12 F-7II/IIN and 2 FT-7BZ delivered. As of January 2022, 7 × F-7 remained in service.

=== Former ===
Albania

- Albanian Air Force: Total 12 F-7A in service from 1969 through 2004, now retired.

China

- People's Liberation Army Air Force: Significant sum in service from 1966 through 2023, now retired.

Egypt

- Egyptian Air Force

Iraq

- Iraqi Air Force: 100 F-7B and 60 F-7M retired after the 2003 invasion of Iraq

United States of America

- United States Air Force: Up to 21 examples delivered to the US between 1982 and 1987 for foreign technology evaluation, including operation by the 4477th Test and Evaluation Squadron as MiG-21 simulators.

== Specifications (J-7MG) ==
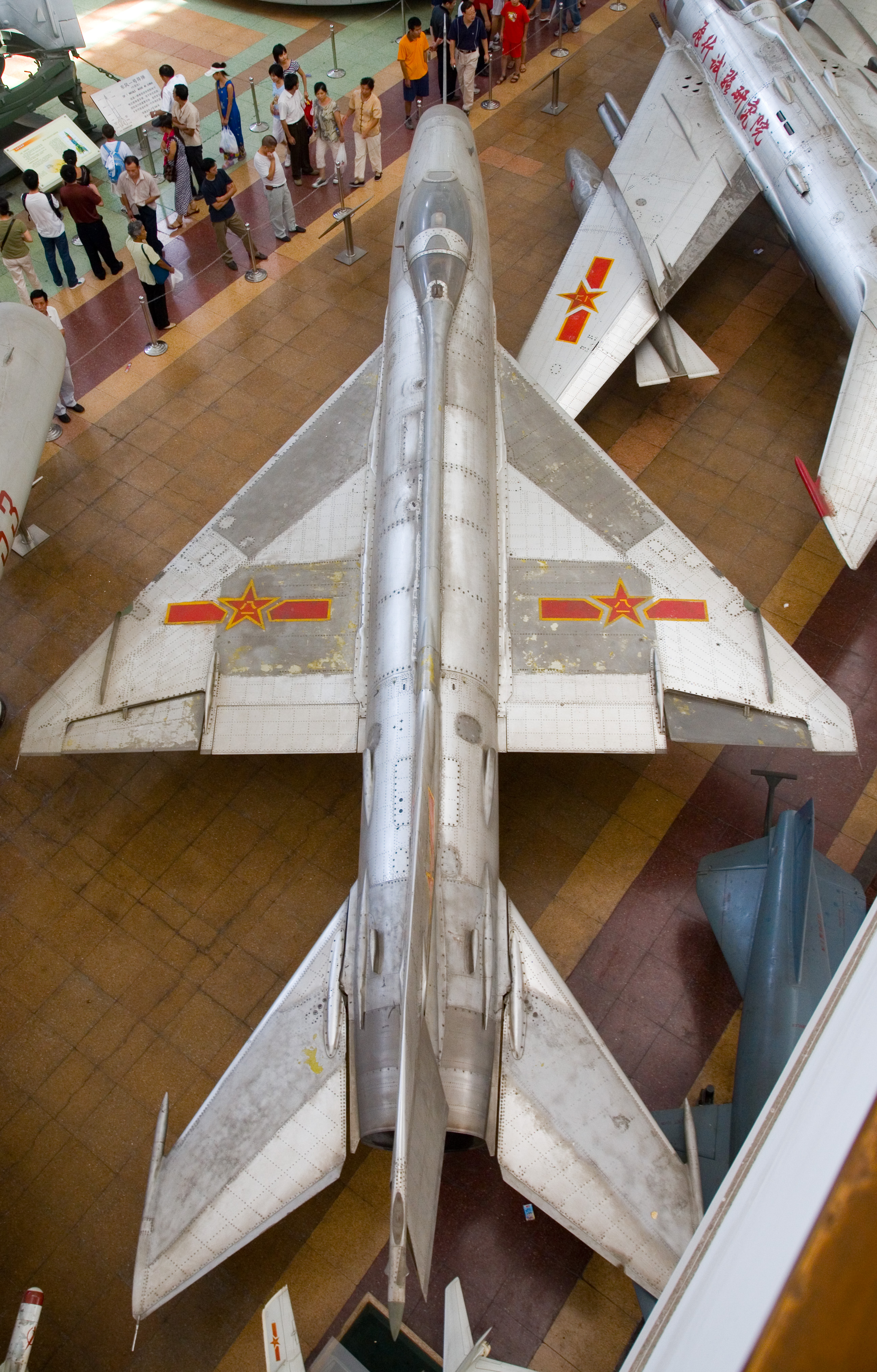
A J-7I seen from above at the Beijing Military Museum. Note the delta wing and distinctive PLAAF markings

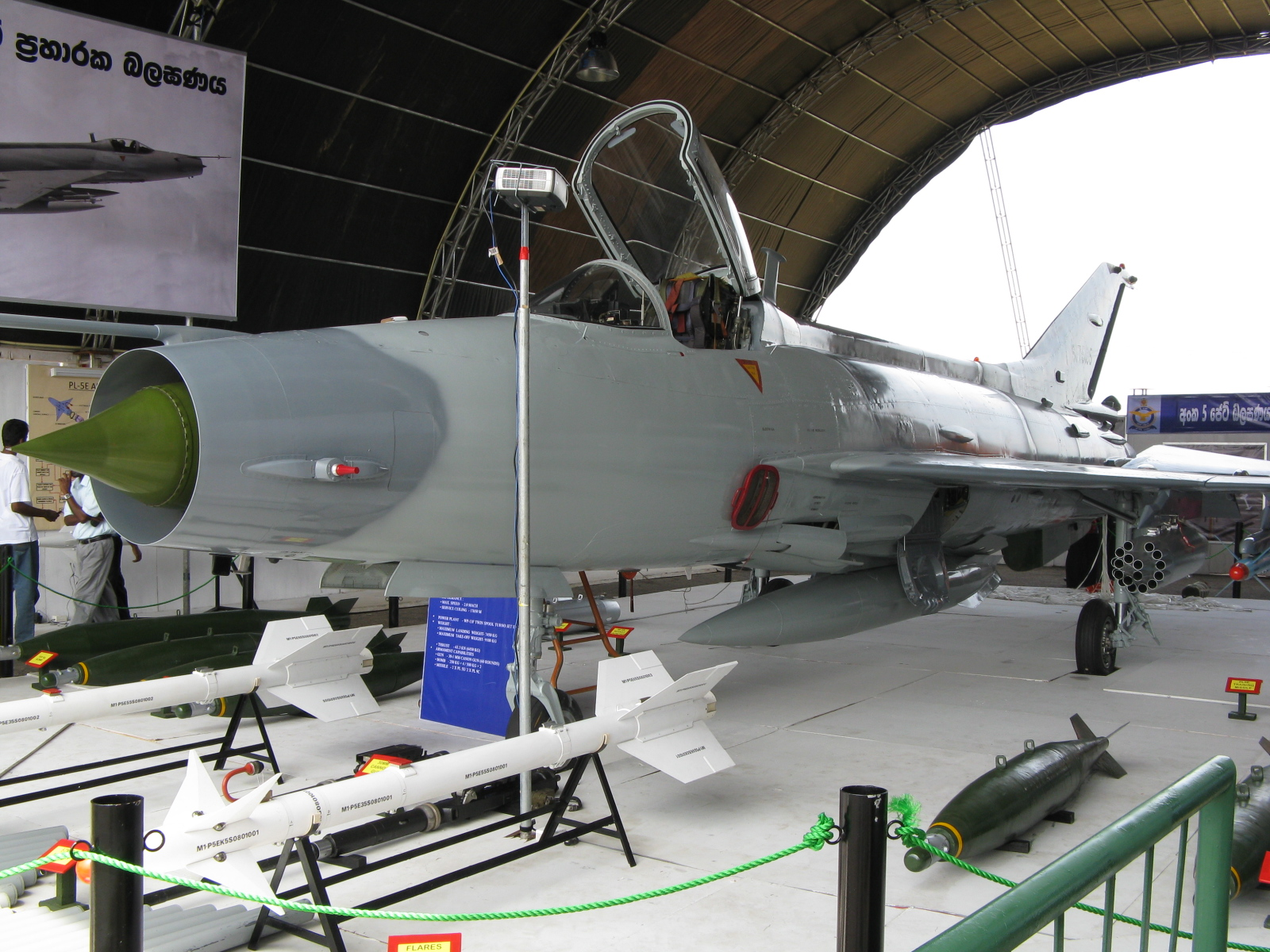
A Sri Lanka Air Force Chengdu F-7GS and stores on static display

Data from Jane's All The World's Aircraft 2003–2004

General characteristics

- Crew: 1
- Length: 14.884 m (48 ft 10 in) (overall)
- Wingspan: 8.32 m (27 ft 4 in)
- Height: 4.11 m (13 ft 6 in)
- Wing area: 24.88 m^{2} (267.8 sq ft)
- Aspect ratio: 2.8
- Airfoil: root: TsAGI S-12 (4.2%); tip: TsAGI S-12 (5%)
- Empty weight: 5,292 kg (11,667 lb)
- Gross weight: 7,540 kg (16,623 lb) with 2x PL-2 or PL-7 air-to-air missiles
- Max takeoff weight: 9,100 kg (20,062 lb)
- Powerplant: 1 × Liyang Wopen-13F afterburning turbojet, 44.1 kN (9,900 lbf) thrust dry, 64.7 kN (14,500 lbf) with afterburner

Performance

- Maximum speed: 2,200 km/h (1,400 mph, 1,200 kn) IAS
- Maximum speed: Mach 2
- Stall speed: 210 km/h (130 mph, 110 kn) IAS
- Combat range: 850 km (530 mi, 460 nmi)
- Ferry range: 2,200 km (1,400 mi, 1,200 nmi)
- Service ceiling: 17,500 m (57,400 ft)
- Rate of climb: 195 m/s (38,400 ft/min)

Armament

- Guns: 2× 30 mm Type 30-1 cannon, 60 rounds per gun
- Hardpoints: 5 total. 4 × under-wing (up to 500 kg (1,100 lb) each), 1 × centerline under-fuselage 2,000 kg (4,400 lb) maximum.
- Rockets: 55 mm rocket pod (12 rounds), 90 mm rocket pod (7 rounds)
- Missiles:
  Air-to-air missiles: PL-2, PL-5, PL-7, PL-8, PL-9, K-13, Magic R.550, AIM-9
- Bombs: 50 kg to 500 kg unguided bombs

Avionics

- FIAR Grifo-7 mk.II radar

== Accidents and incidents ==
- On 8 April 2008, Squadron Leader Morshed Hasan died when his Bangladesh Air Force F-7 crashed in Ghatail Upazila in Tangail District. Hasan ejected from the aircraft but was critically injured when his parachute malfunctioned. He died at the Combined Military Hospital in Dhaka.
- On 6 May 2010, a Chinese PLAAF J-7 crashed due to engine failure near Jinan, China.
- On 13 April 2011, a Chinese PLAAF J-7 crashed near Liujiang County and Xincheng County, Liuzhou during a training flight.
- On 4 December 2012, a Chinese PLAAF J-7 crashed into a residential building in Shantou, Guangdong Province. Four civilians were injured as a result of the crash.
- On 29 June 2015, Bangladesh Air Force Flight Lieutenant Tahmid died when his F-7MB crashed into the Bay of Bengal. The aircraft took at 10:27 am from BAF Zahurul Haq Base, lost contact with the control room around 11:10 am, and crashed in the Bay of Bengal off Patenga around 11:30 am.
- On 24 November 2015, flying officer Marium Mukhtiar—the first female fighter pilot in the PAF—died when a twin-seat FT-7PG crashed at PAF Base M.M. Alam near Kundian in Punjab Province on a training mission. Both pilots ejected, but Mukhtiar died from injuries sustained on landing. She was occupying the rear seat for instrument flight rules training.
- On 23 November 2018, Bangladesh Air Force Wing Commander Arif Ahmed Dipu died when his F-7BG crashed in Tangail's Madhupur Upazila on a training mission. The fuel tank reportedly caught fire once the aircraft used weaponry in the sky, forcing the pilot to eject at low altitude.
- On 7 January 2020, a Pakistan Air Force FT-7 crashed while on a training mission near Mianwali. Both pilots were killed.
- On 15 October 2021, a Namibian Air Force F-7 overshot the runway while landing at Ondangwa Airport, striking a security fence. A drag chute had failed to deploy.
- On 24 May 2022, two Iranian Air Force pilots were killed when their FT-7 crashed near Anarak.
- On 9 June 2022, a PLAAF J-7 crashed in a residential area in Hubei, China, destroying several houses and killing at least one person on the ground. The pilot ejected with minor injuries.
- On 30 May 2025, a J-7 of the Air Force of Zimbabwe crashed shortly after takeoff from Josiah Tungamirai Air Force Base near Gweru. The pilot, Squadron Leader Ritswanetsi Vuyo Ncube, was killed. He had reported an uncontrolled fire before the crash.
- On 10 June 2025, during the Myanmar civil war, an F-7M of the Myanmar Air Force crashed into a monastery in Sapar Sae village in Pale, Myanmar. It was conducting operations against resistance forces, and was reportedly shot down. The pilot was killed, as were five villagers.
- On 21 July 2025, a Bangladesh Air Force twin-seat trainer FT-7BGI, tail number 701, crashed in Uttara, Dhaka, Bangladesh, impacting the campus of Milestone School & College. At least 35 people, including the pilot, were killed, and 171 people (mostly students) were injured, making it the deadliest crash related to this aircraft to date.

== See also ==
Related development

- Mikoyan-Gurevich MiG-21
- Guizhou JL-9
- Shenyang J-8
- Project Sabre II

Aircraft of comparable role, configuration, and era

- English Electric Lightning
