= PL-5 =

PL-5B / PL-5C / PL-5E
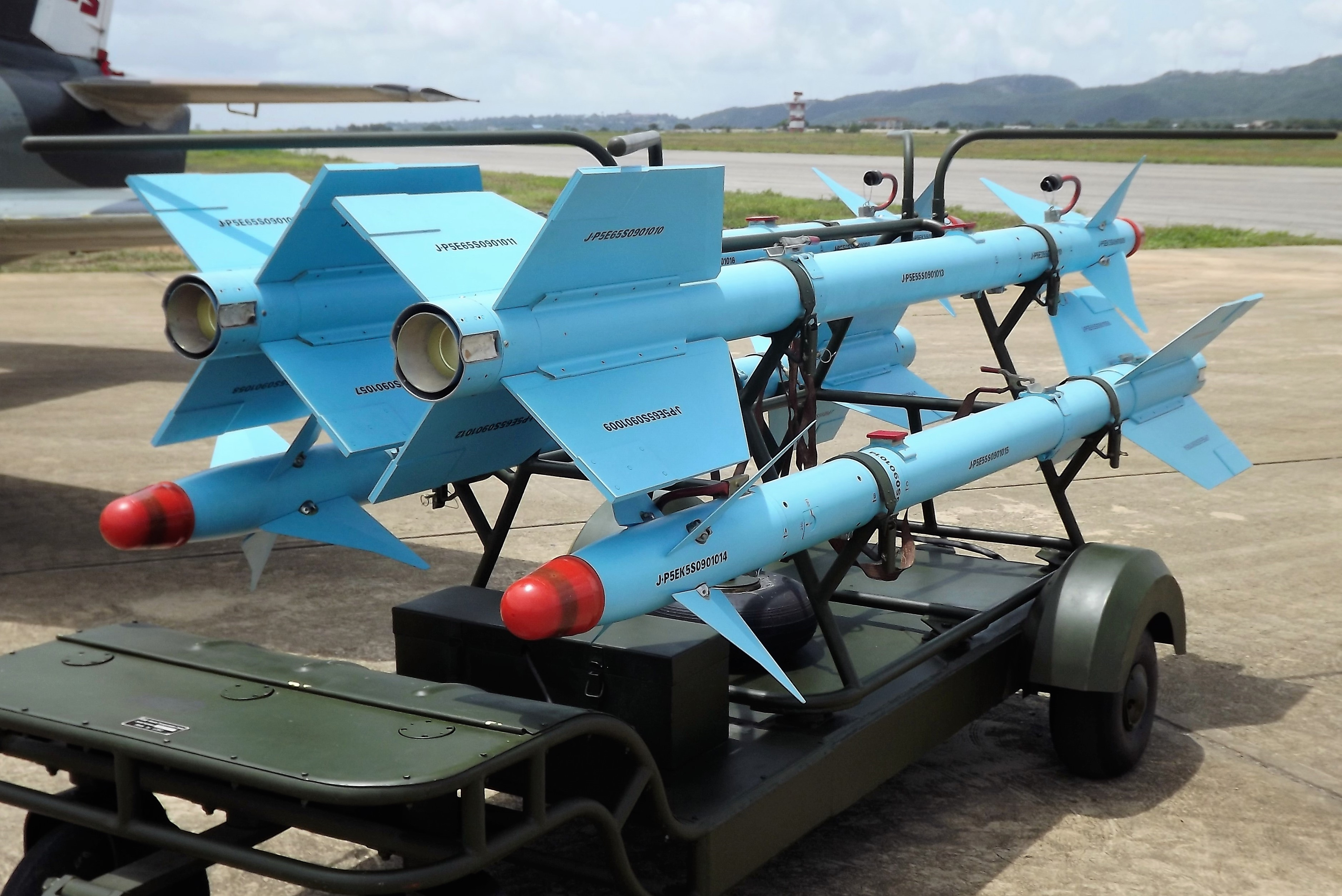
- PL-5 missiles
- Type: Short-range air-to-air missile
- Place of origin: China

Production history
- Manufacturer: Luoyang Electro-Optics Technology Development Centre (EOTDC), Hanzhong Nanfeng Machine Factory
- Produced: 1982

Specifications
- Mass: 148 kg (PL-5B, PL-5C), 83kg (PL-5E)
- Length: 3.128 m (PL-5B, PL-5C), 2.893m (PL-5E)
- Diameter: 0.127m (PL-5E)
- Wingspan: 0.657m (PL-5B, PL-5C), 0.617m (PL-5E)
- Warhead: 6kg blast-frag, or expanding rod (RF-fuse)
- Detonation mechanism: Active infrared, laser proximity fuse(PL-5EII)
- Engine: Solid-fuel rocket
- Operational range: 1.3–16km (PL-5B, PL-5C), 0.5-16~18km (PL-5E)
- Maximum speed: Mach 2.5
- Guidance system: Infrared homing, multi-element, dual band detector(PL-5EII)
- Launch platform: Aircraft, helicopter gunships

The PL-5 (霹雳-5) air-to-air missile (PL stands for Pi Li, "Thunderbolt" in Chinese, the generic designation for all PRC air-to-air missiles) is a short-range, Infrared homing missile used by Chinese 2nd and 3rd generation fighters and jet trainers. It is an upgraded version of the PL-2, which is based on Vympel K-13 (AA-2 "Atoll") technology that resembles the AIM-9 Sidewinder. The PLAAF's latest-generation non-stealth fighters like the J-10 and J-11 mainly use PL-8B and PL-10 missiles, while stealth fighters like the J-20 and J-35 rely exclusively on the PL-10 for short-range engagements. These models are more advanced short-range air-to-air missiles than the PL-5. However, due to the greater weight and dimensions of the PL-8 and PL-10 missiles, the PL-5, PL-7, and PL-9 are still the preferable air-to-air missiles for the F-7 at this stage.

The PL-5 was designed and developed at China's Luoyang Electro-Optics Technology Development Centre (EOTDC), also known as Institute 612; its design team members included Chen Jiali (陈家礼), Dong Chunfeng, Hu Rongchao (胡荣超), Huang Bin, Zhang Ming (张明), and Zheng Zhiwei (郑志伟). It was reportedly produced at the Hanzhong Nanfeng Machine Factory (also known as the Hanzhong Air-to-Air Missile Factory) of the China Aviation Industry Corporation I.

The PL-5 have been continuously upgraded by Luoyang and the latest variant, the PL-5EII, added a dual band, multi-element detector as well as a laser proximity fuse similar to the PL-9. According to the Chinese export/import agency CATIC, the PL-5E has an all-aspect capability with the seeker having a maximum off boresight angle of ±25° before launch, and ±40° after launch.

== History ==
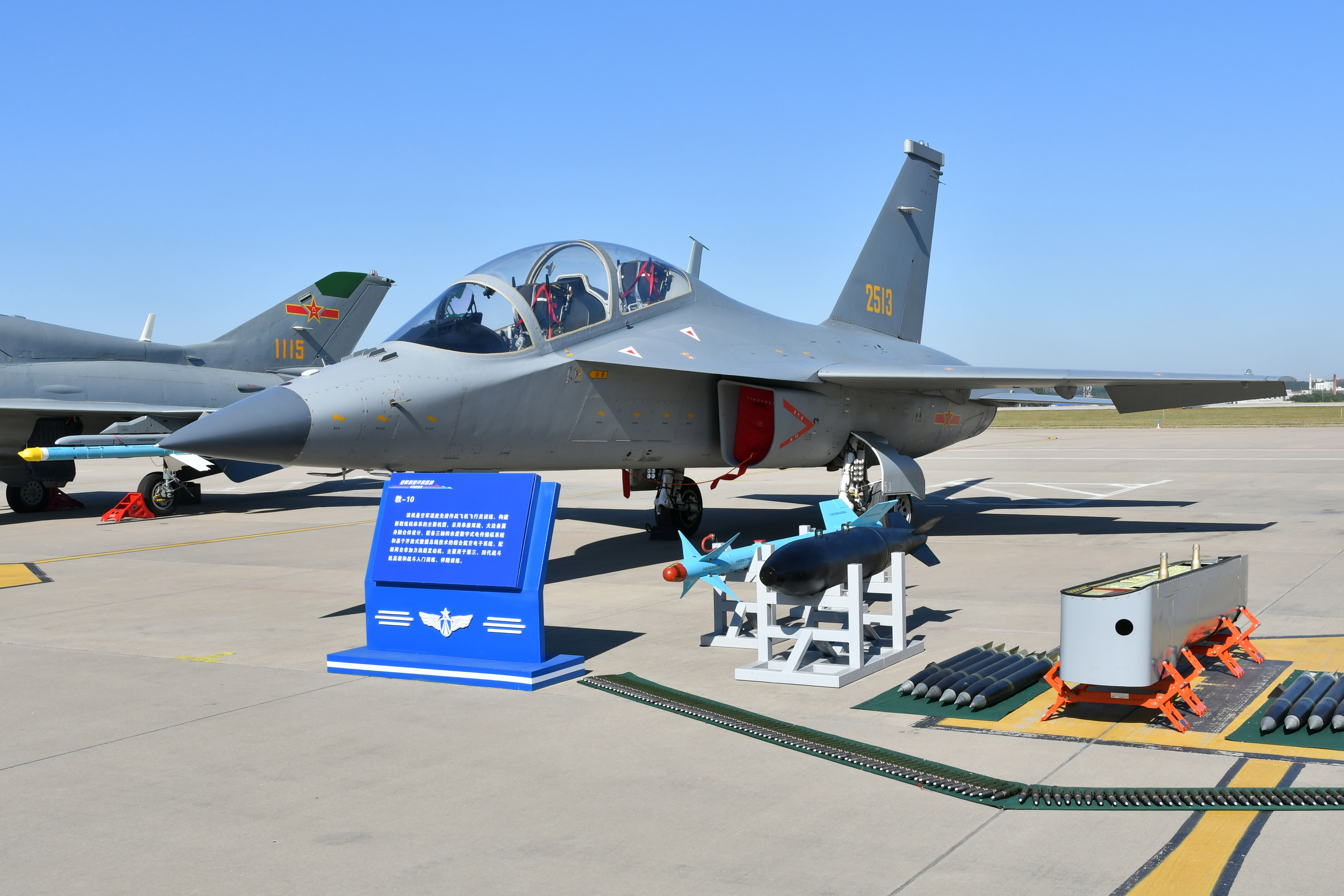
PLAAF JL-10 with armaments including the PL-5 short-range air-to-air missile

The PL-5 missile took a long time to enter service. The missile is the successor of the PL-2 short-range air-to-air missile. Developers started working on PL-5 in 1966, but it didn't actually go into production until 1982. At first, designers thought about using radar to guide the missile, similar to the U.S. Navy's AIM-9C. Instead, they ended up making it a heat-seeking weapon and named this final version the PL-5B. Over the years, the military kept improving the design. The improved PL-5C rolled out in the mid-1980s, followed by the PL-5E-II in the early 1990s.

On September 2, 2026, an aerial encounter happened over the disputed Scarborough Shoal in the South China Sea. Three Chinese military Hongdu JL-10 jet trainer intercepted and drove away three propeller driven Philippine aircraft when armed with PL-5 short-range air-to-air missiles. China used the JL-10 light combat aircraft for low-risk interception missions as a cost-effective strategy.

== Operators ==
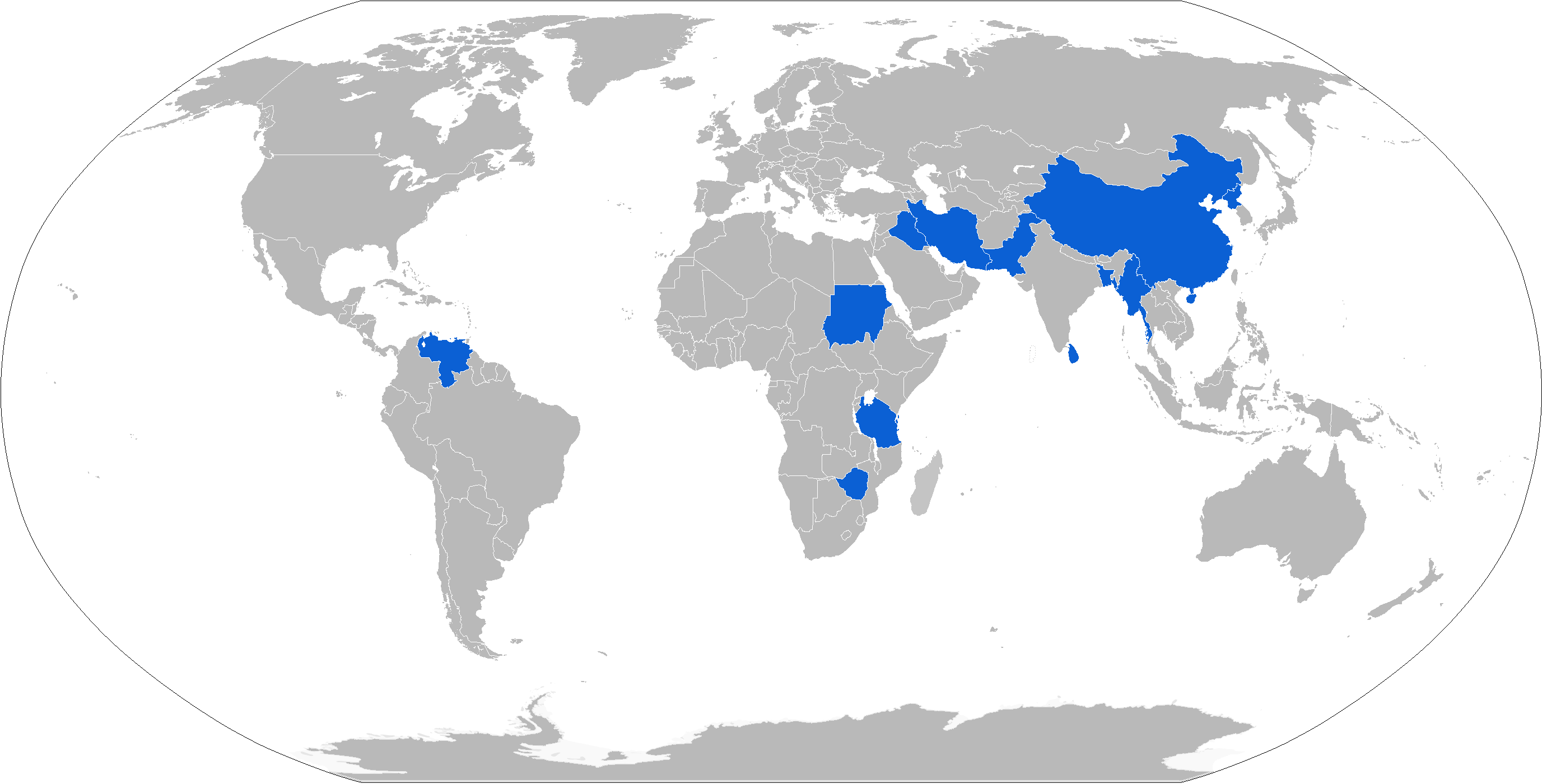
Map with PL-5 operators in blue

=== Current operators ===
- Bangladesh uses PL-5 and PL-5EII
- China
- Burma PL-5B and PL-5EII
- Egypt
- Iran
- Pakistan 1200 ordered, PL-5E.
- Sri Lanka
- Sudan
- Tanzania
- Venezuela 100 ordered, PL-5E.
- Zimbabwe
