= Guizhou JL-9 =

Chinese Advanced trainer & light attack aircraft

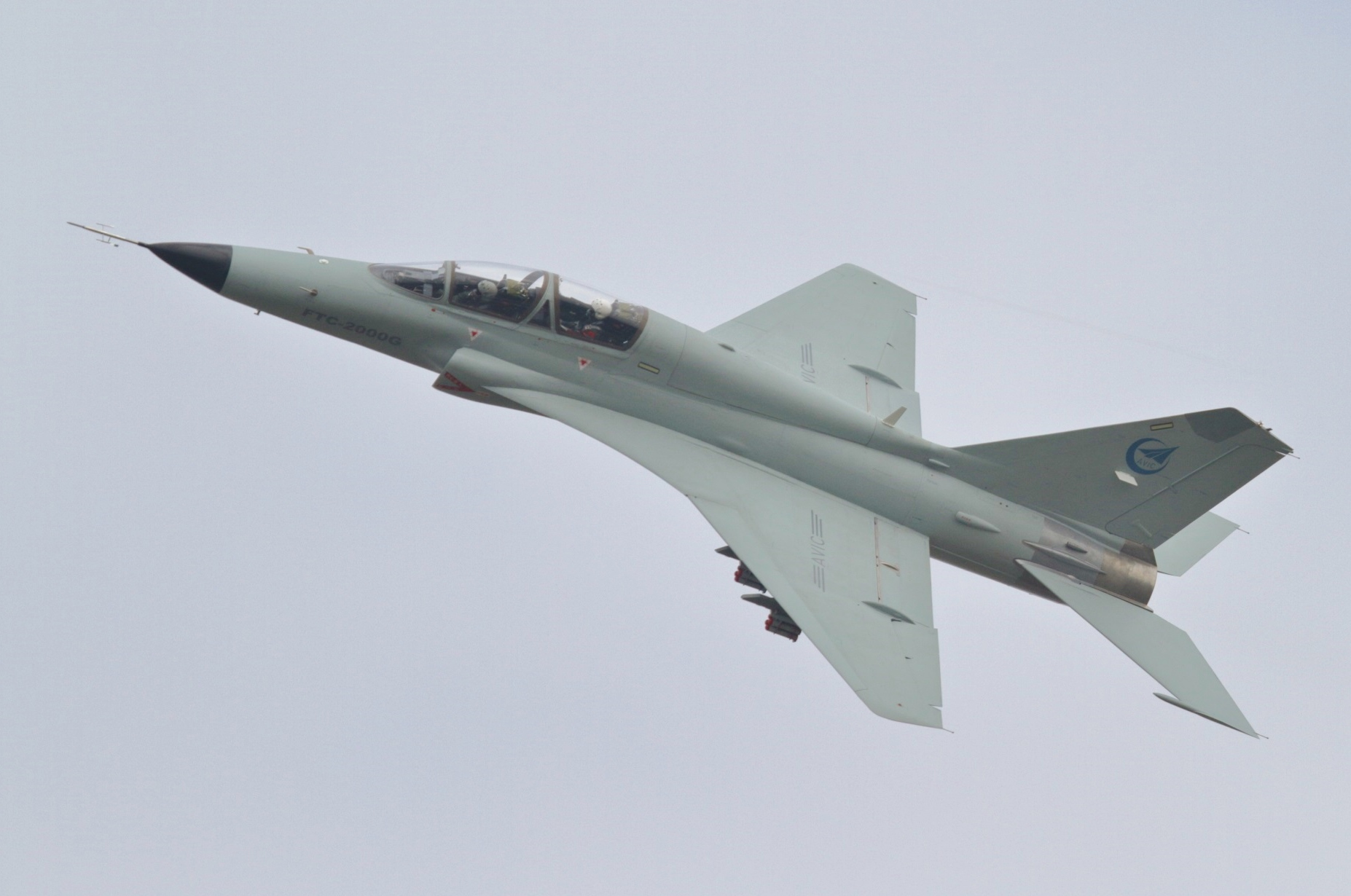
- An FTC-2000G advanced jet trainer performing its display routine at Airshow China 2018

General information
- Type: Advanced jet trainer Light combat aircraft
- Manufacturer: Guizhou Aviation Industry Import/Export Company (GAIEC)
- Designer: Aero Engine Research Institute of Guizhou Aviation Industry Corporation
- Status: In service
- Primary users: People's Liberation Army Air Force People's Liberation Army Navy Air Force; Myanmar Air Force; Sudanese Air Force

History
- First flight: 13 December 2003
- Developed from: Chengdu JJ-7

The Guizhou JL-9, also known as the FTC-2000 Mountain Eagle (Chinese: 山鹰; pinyin: Shānyīng), is a family of two-seat transonic advanced jet trainer and light combat aircraft developed by the Guizhou Aviation Industry Import/Export Company (GAIEC) for the People's Liberation Army Air Force (PLAAF) and the People's Liberation Army Naval Air Force (PLANAF).

== Development ==
The FTC-2000 started as a GAIEC private venture to develop an inexpensive trainer for fourth generation aircraft. The trainer was revealed at the 2001 China International Aviation & Aerospace Exhibition. The aircraft are reported to be produced at a GAIC assembly line in Anshun, Guizhou.

The FTC-2000, as the JL-9, competed with the Hongdu JL-10 to meet the advanced trainer requirements of the PLAAF and PLANAF. The JL-10 is more technologically advanced, but also more expensive, than the JL-9. In 2013, both had entered production.

A carrier-landing trainer variant was revealed by Chinese state media in 2011. Designated the JL-9G, it has strengthened undercarriage, enlarged wing and diverterless supersonic inlets, but has proved to be unsuitable for arrested landings and is limited to land-based operations.

On 5 September 2018, Chinese state-run Xinhua News Agency reported that GAIC had begun mass production of the FTC-2000G variant. On 28 September, it was reported that the first mass-produced FTC-2000G performed its maiden flight. In April 2020, China reported that an unnamed South-East Asian country had placed an order for the FTC-2000G, with deliveries expected between 2021 and 2023. Later it was confirmed that Myanmar had ordered those jets.

== Design ==
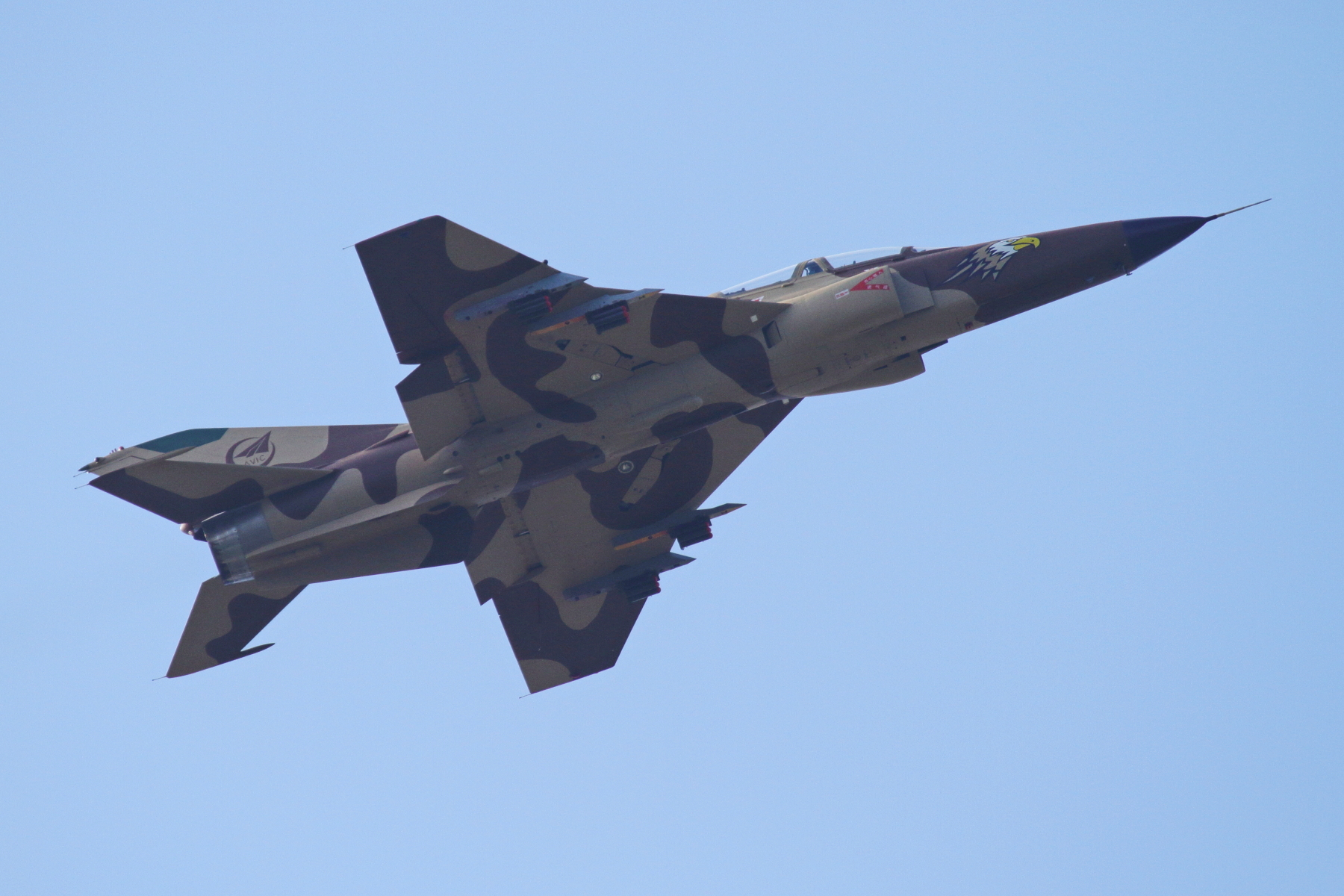
A FTC-2000 at Zhuhai airshow 2016

The FTC-2000 is developed from the JJ-7/FT-7, the two seat trainer version of the Chengdu J-7; the Chengdu J-7 is a Chinese variant of the MiG-21. The FTC-2000 uses a new wing, a forward fuselage with side air intakes, and a glass cockpit; the engine, empennage, and mechanical controls of the JJ-7/FT-7 are retained.

== Operational history ==
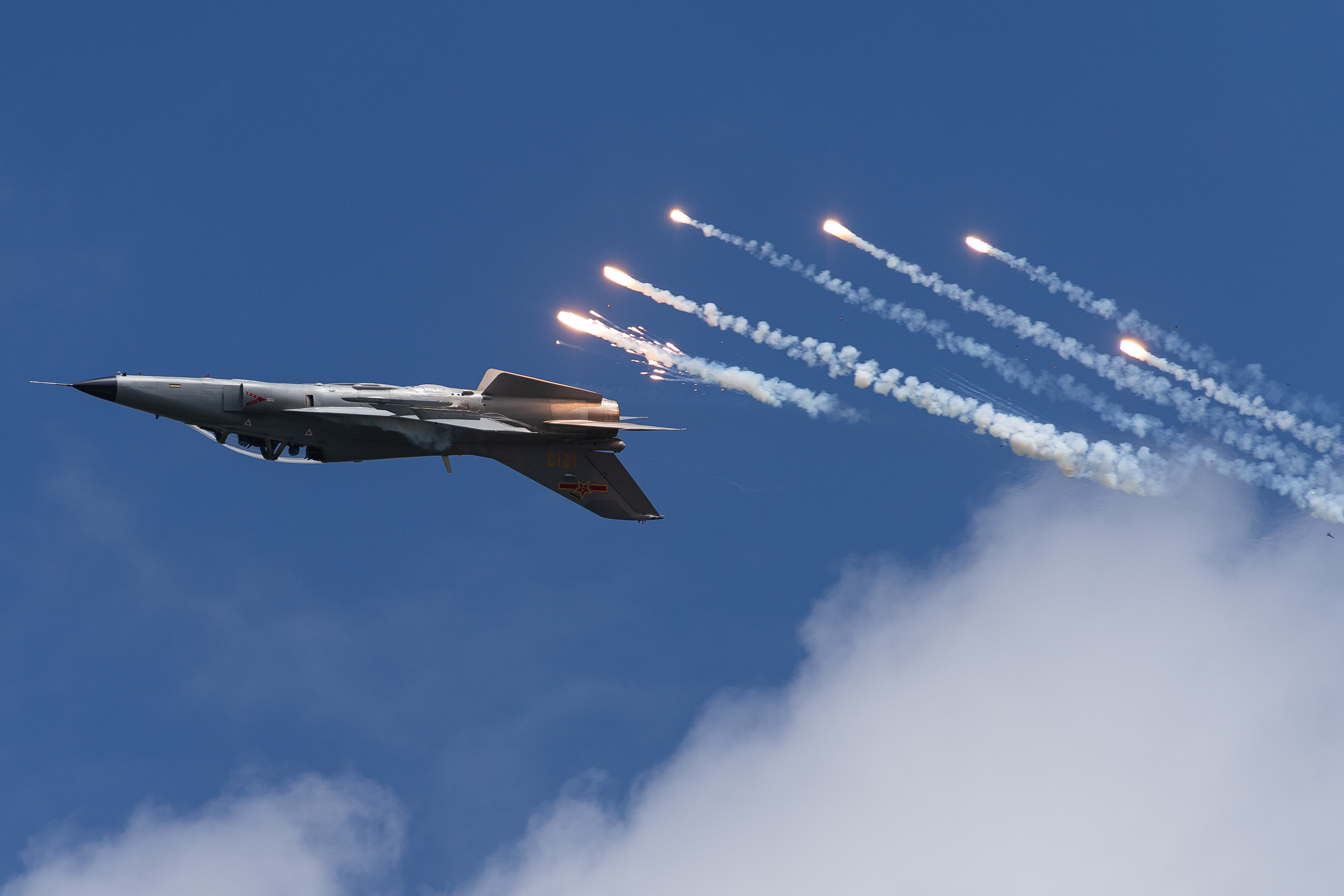
A PLAAF JL-9 releasing flare

In 2014, the PLANAF had equipped a regiment with JL-9s. However, it was not until 18 October 2015 that the PLAAF started using the JL-9 for training purposes.

In April 2023, the Rapid Support Forces of Sudan launched an attack on Merowe Air Base, destroying one Sudanese FTC-2000 while capturing the base. Satellite imagery has revealed that three more FTC-2000s were present at the base at the time.

On 16 January 2024 a Myanmar Air Force FTC-2000G was shot down by a Kachin Independence Army FN-6 missile in Shan State. Both pilots were killed. On 10 June 2025 a Myanmar Air Force FTC-2000G was reported as lost due to rebel action in the Sagaing region.

In July 2025, according to local Burmese sources, the Karenni Nationalities Defence Force (KNDF) claimed to have shot down a Myanmar military FTC-2000G fighter jet during clashes in Hpasawng town, Karenni (Kayah) State. The jet had gone missing two days earlier while providing air support to junta forces, and wreckage was later reported near a village close to the Bago Region border.

== Variants ==
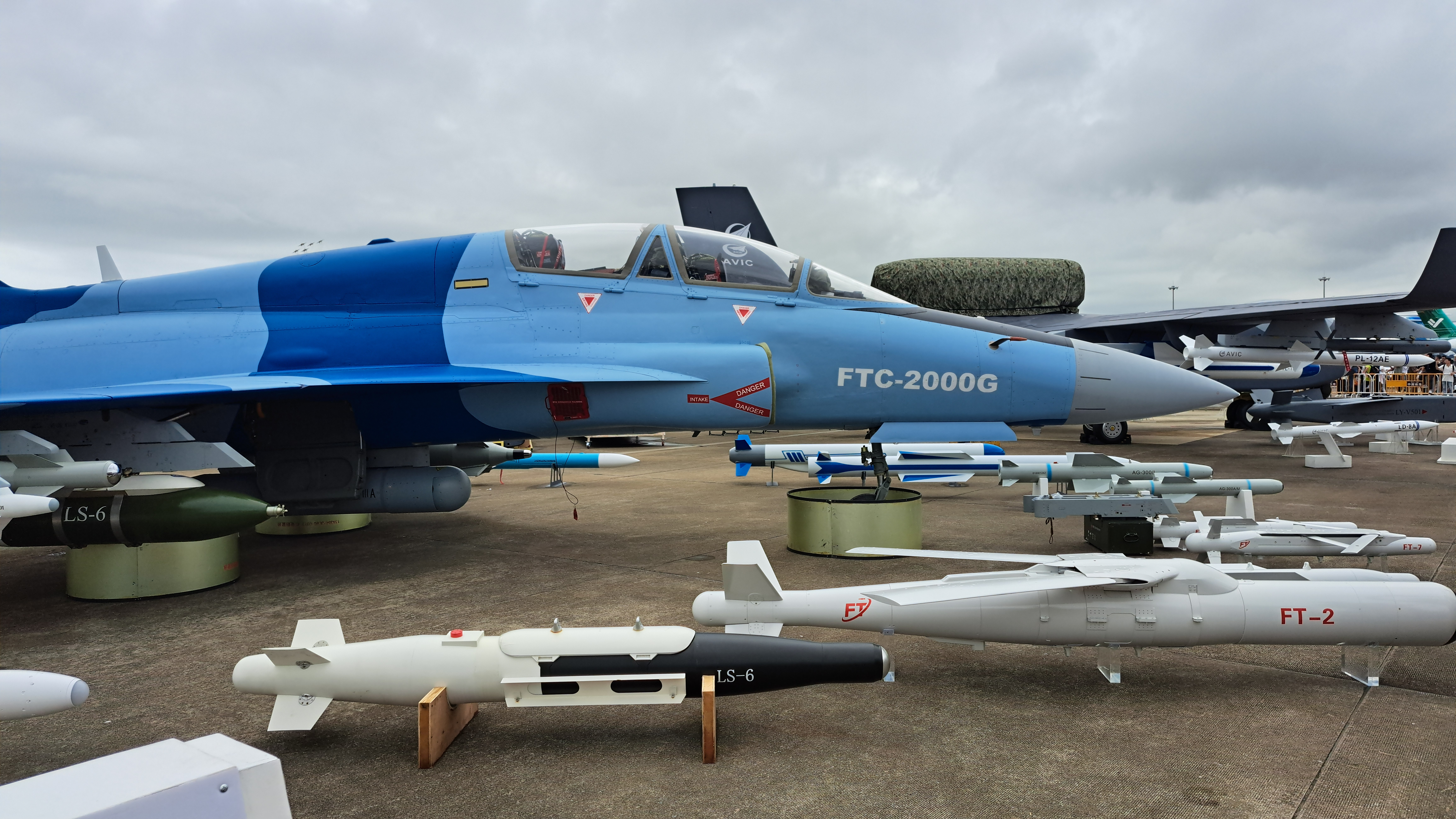
FTC-2000G in Zhuhai airshow 2024

- FTC-2000: Original model and export designation.
- FTC-2000G: The FTC-2000G is a dual seat light combat aircraft/lead-in fighter trainer. It is one of the cheapest light fighters on the market with the aim to replace old legacy fighters like the J-7/F-7 and MiG-21. It has 7 hardpoints. It also features a diverterless supersonic inlet. It made its first flight in September 2018. Compared to the FTC-2000 trainer variant, the FTC-2000G is heavier, has a maximum speed of Mach 1.2 due to a new wing design, and has less endurance than the FTC-2000. The aircraft can carry a maximum of 3 tons of weaponry. The FTC-2000G and JL-9G have revised intakes with a diverterless supersonic inlet design.
- JL-9: Initial PLA variant.
- JL-9G: PLANAF carrier-trainer variant. It is a modified JL-9 for aircraft carrier training. It is designed for ski-jump ramp takeoffs and simulated arrested landings (land-based). and includes a tailhook.

== Operators ==
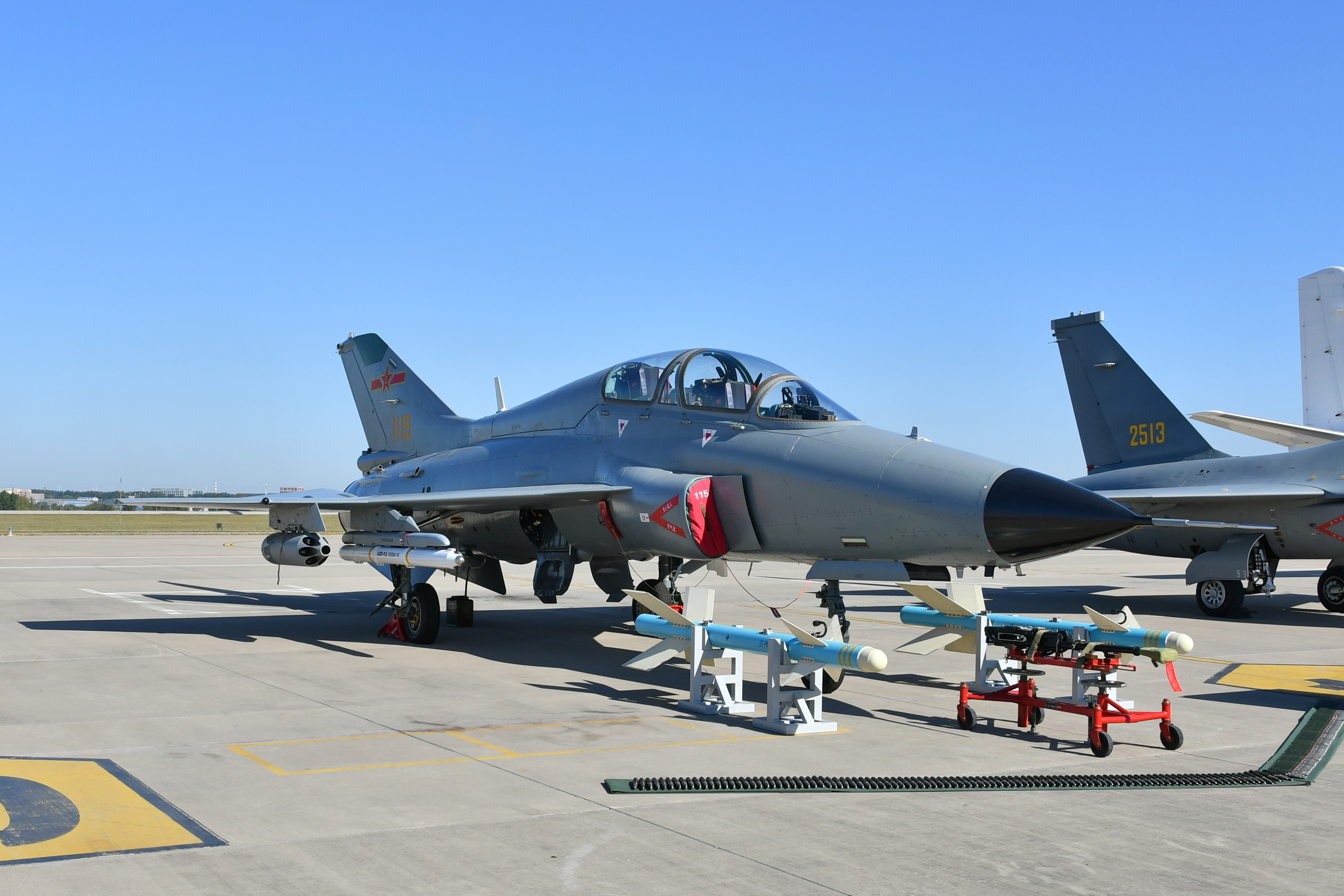
PLAAF JL-9 at Air Force open day

- China
  - People's Liberation Army Air Force – 30 JL-9
  - People's Liberation Army Naval Air Force – 28 JL-9, 12 JL-9G
- Myanmar
  - Myanmar Air Force — 12 delivered (unknown number ordered)
- Sudan
  - Sudanese Air Force — 5 (66th Squadron)

== Specifications (FTC-2000) ==
Data from Jane's All the World's Aircraft 2010-11

General characteristics

- Crew: 2
- Length: 14.555 m (47 ft 9 in) excluding nose-probe
- Wingspan: 8.32 m (27 ft 4 in)
- Height: 4.105 m (13 ft 6 in)
- Wing area: 26.15 m^{2} (281.5 sq ft)
- Gross weight: 7,800 kg (17,196 lb) clean

7,900 kg (17,417 lb) normal

- Max takeoff weight: 9,800 kg (21,605 lb)
- Fuel capacity: 2,000 kg (4,409 lb) internal + up to 1,302 kg (2,870 lb) in external tanks
- Powerplant: 1 × Guizhou Liyang WP-13F (C) afterburning turbojet, 43.15 kN (9,700 lbf) thrust dry, 63.25 kN (14,220 lbf) with afterburner
  (1 × WP-14C Kunlun-3 for FTC-2000G, 53.89 kN (12,110 lbf) thrust dry and 76.53 kN (17,200 lbf) with afterburner.)

Performance

- Maximum speed: 1,100 km/h (680 mph, 590 kn) / Mach 0.89
- Unstick and touchdown speed: 260 km/h (160 mph; 140 kn)
- Minimum flying speed: 210 km/h (130 mph; 110 kn)
- Cruise speed: 870 km/h (540 mph, 470 kn)
- Stall speed: 125 km/h (78 mph, 67 kn)
- Range: 863 km (536 mi, 466 nmi) on internal fuel
- Ferry range: 2,400 km (1,500 mi, 1,300 nmi) with maximum internal and external fuel
- Endurance: 3 hours
- Service ceiling: 16,000 m (52,000 ft)
- g limits: +8 -3
- Rate of climb: 150 m/s (30,000 ft/min) at sea level
- Wing loading: 374.8 kg/m^{2} (76.8 lb/sq ft)
- Thrust/weight: 0.00645 kN/kg (0.658 lb_{f}/lb)
- Take-off run: 400–500 m (1,300–1,600 ft)
- Landing run: 700 m (2,300 ft)

Armament

- Guns: 1 × 23 mm cannon
- Hardpoints: 5 with a capacity of 2,000 kg (4,409 lb) maximum, with provisions to carry combinations of:
  - Other: up to 3 x fuel tanks
- Missiles: ** Short range air-to-air missile
    - 2 × PL-8 AAMs (on inboard pylons)
    - 2 × PL-9 AAMs (on outboard pylons)
  - Beyond-visual-range air-to-air missiles
    - SD-10 (Only on FTC-2000G)
  - Anti-radiation missiles
    - CM-102 (Only on FTC-2000G)

Avionics

- Pulse Doppler radar
- comms
- IFF
- Transponder
- EFIS
- HOTAS
- GPS / INS

== See also ==
Related development

- Chengdu J-7
- Mikoyan-Gurevich MiG-21

Aircraft of comparable role, configuration, and era

- Hongdu JL-10
- KAI T-50 Golden Eagle
- TAI Hürjet
