= PL-2 =

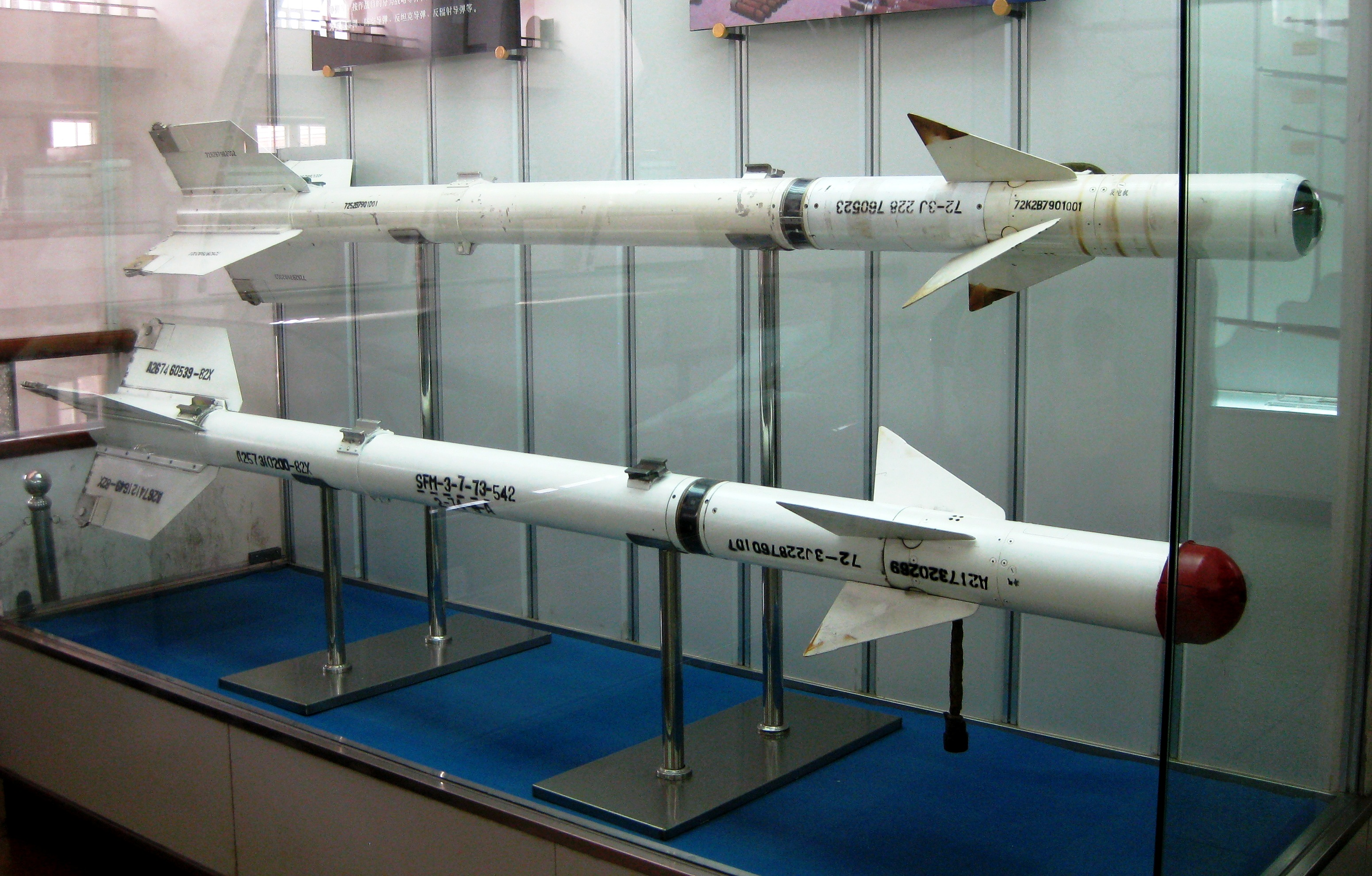
- PL-2
- Type: Short-range air-to-air missile
- Place of origin: China

Service history
- In service: 1970s to present
- Used by: China

Production history
- Manufacturer: Luoyang Electro-Optics Technology Development Centre (EOTDC)
- Produced: 1970s to 1980s

Specifications
- Mass: 60–152.3 kg (132–336 lb)
- Length: 2.15–2.99 m (7 ft 1 in – 9 ft 10 in)
- Diameter: 127 mm (5 in)
- Wingspan: 528–609 mm (1 ft 9 in – 2 ft 0 in)
- Warhead: 11.3 kg (25 lb) high explosive
- Detonation mechanism: Impact / Proximity
- Engine: rocket 2668dN
- Propellant: solid fuel
- Operational range: 6–10 km (4–6 mi)
- Flight ceiling: 15–21.5 km (9–13 mi)
- Maximum speed: Mach 1.6 to 2.5
- Guidance system: Nitrogen cooled passive InPb infrared seeker
- Launch platform: aerial

The PL-2 (Chinese: 霹雳-2; pinyin: Pī Lì-2; lit. 'Thunderbolt-2') is an infrared homing (IRH) short-range air-to-air missile (AAM) developed in the People's Republic of China (PRC). It was a reverse-engineered Soviet Vympel K-13, which in turn was a reverse-engineered American AIM-9B Sidewinder. The missile is the successor of the PL-1 (Chinese produced beam riding K-5) short-range air-to-air missile. The PL-2 was the root of a family of AAMs; of the derivatives, only the PL-5 was successful.

== PL-2 ==
The PRC acquired an intact AIM-9B during the Second Taiwan Strait Crisis in 1958. Air combat over the strait between the Republic of China Air Force (ROCAF) and the People's Liberation Army Air Force (PLAAF) marked the combat debut of AAMs, with Sidewinder-armed ROCAF F-86 Sabres achieving notable success against PLAAF J-5s. On 28 September, a J-5 returned to base with an unexploded Sidewinder lodged in its airframe.

China's attempts to reverse engineer the AIM-9B failed. China transferred the missile to the Soviet Union, which agreed to share the reverse engineered product (Vympel K-13); in 1961, China received technical data for and examples of the K-13. Replication of the K-13 began in 1962 with live-fire tests occurring in 1967. In 1967, Factory 331 in Zhuzhou was permitted to begin series production, but series production was delayed until 1970 due to the Cultural Revolution. In 1970, production transferred to the Nanfeng Machinery Plant in Hanzhong. Production of the PL-2A ended in February 1984.

The PL-2B was based on the AIM-9E. Development began in 1976 and it entered mass production in 1981; production ended in 1986.

== PL-3 ==
The PL-3 was China's first "indigenously-designed" AAM and intended as a major improvement over the PL-2. The requirements were overambitious and the Cultural Revolution disrupted development. The first prototypes were delivered for ground testing in 1968, and received final state certification in 1980. It was only marginally better than the PL-2 and the proximity fuse was unreliable. The missile was cancelled in 1983.

== PL-5 ==
The PL-5B was the passive infrared-homing variant of the PL-5 AAM; it was an improved PL-2. The 612 Institute (later the China Airborne Missile Academy) began PL-5 development in 1966, and low-rate PL-5B production started in 1987. The semi-active radar homing PL-5A was cancelled in 1983. The PL-5B was developed into the all-aspect PL-5E, which became available in 1999.

== PL-6 ==
The IRH PL-6 was intended to provide China with a high-maneuverability AAM comparable to contemporary foreign designs. Development started in 1975 based on the PL-5B and was ready for flight-testing in 1979. It was cancelled in 1983 in favor of the PL-7, a reverse-engineered French R.550 Magic.

== Operators ==
Bangladesh

- Bangladesh Air Force

Myanmar

- Myanmar Air Force

Pakistan

- Pakistan air force - PL-2 historically used on the Shenyang F-6.

China

- People's Liberation Army
  - People's Liberation Army Air Force
  - People's Liberation Army Navy Air Force

Zimbabwe

- Air Force of Zimbabwe - replaced by the PL-5
