= Guizhou Aircraft Industry Corporation =

Chinese aircraft manufacturer

Guizhou Aircraft Industry Corporation (GAIC) or Guizhou Aviation Aircraft Co Ltd (GAC) is a Chinese aircraft manufacturer and military aircraft based in Guiyang, Guizhou. It is a subsidiary of the Aviation Industry Corporation of China (AVIC). The company's core products include trainers, turbojets, UAVs, missiles and launchers. Within a joint venture with Subaru named Yunque (云雀), they've also built Chinese license versions of cars like Subaru Rex and Subaru Vivio.

== Products ==
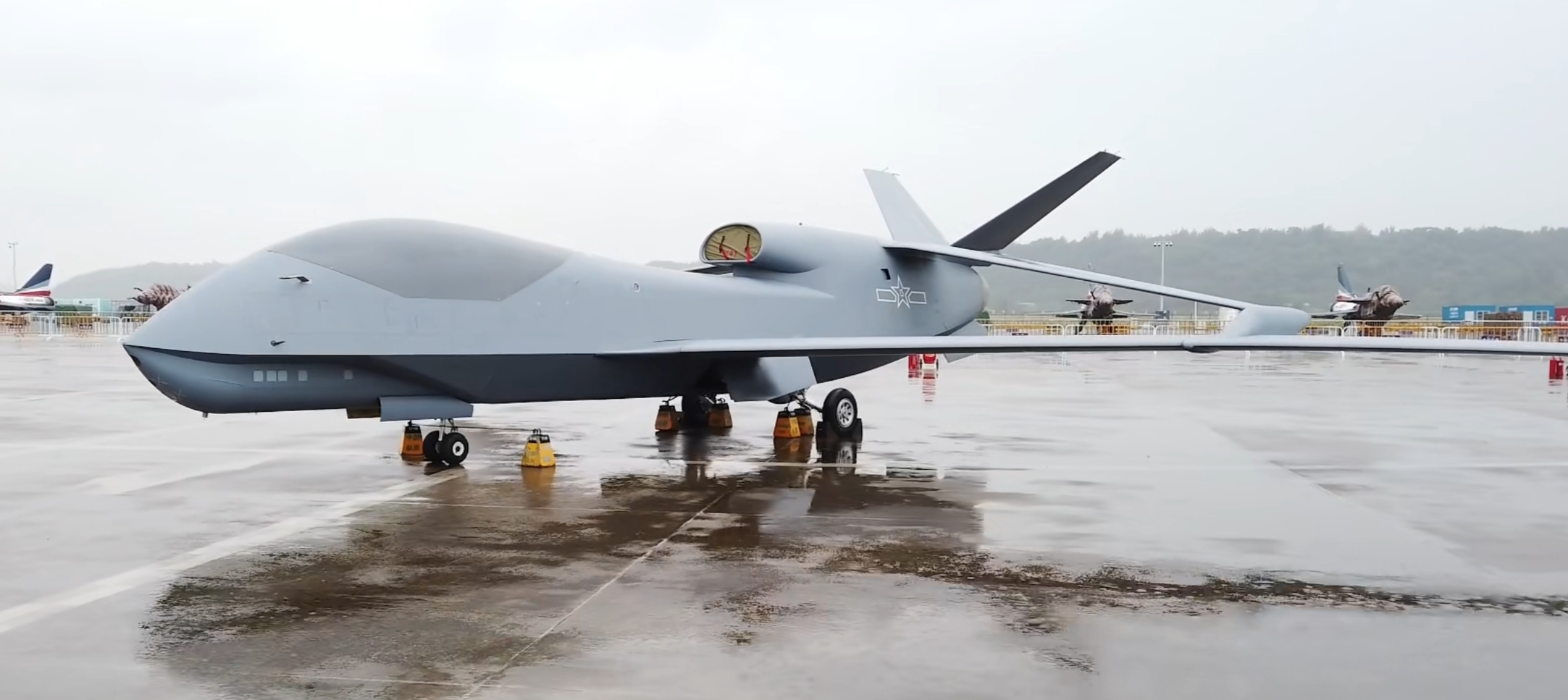
Xiáng Lóng (Soaring Dragon)

Trainers

JL-9
FTC2000 Mountain Eagle 2-seat trainer - based on JJ-7 / MIG-21U fighter trainer

Fighters

JJ-7
upgraded version of the original MiG-21

J-10

Unmanned aerial vehicles

WZ-2000
multipurpose unmanned aerial vehicle
Xiáng Lóng (Soaring Dragon)
Harrier Hawk

Turbofan engine

WS-13
Major application: JF-17 light weight fighter and J-31 stealth fighter.

== See also ==
- Aviation Industry Corporation of China (AVIC)
- ACAC consortium
- Changhe Aircraft Industries Corporation
- Chengdu Aircraft Industry Group
- Harbin Aircraft Industry Group
- Hongdu Aviation Industry Corporation
- Shaanxi Aircraft Corporation
- Shanghai Aviation Industrial Company
- Shenyang Aircraft Corporation
- Xi'an Aircraft Industrial Corporation
