= PL-9 =

Air-to-air missile

- Type: Short-range air-to-air missile
- Place of origin: People's Republic of China

Service history
- In service: c. 1989

Production history
- Manufacturer: Luoyang Electro-Optics Technology Development Centre (EOTDC); Hanzhong Nanfeng Machine Factory; Xi’an Eastern Machinery Factory
- Produced: 1989—present

Specifications
- Mass: 123kg (PL-9); 115kg (PL-9C)
- Length: 2.9m (PL-9/C)
- Diameter: 0.157m (PL-9C)
- Wingspan: 0.856m (PL-9C)
- Warhead: 11.8kg blast-frag, or expanding rod (RF-fuse)
- Detonation mechanism: laser proximity fuse
- Engine: Solid-fuel rocket
- Operational range: 15km (PL-9); 22km (PL-9C, air-to-air) >8km (DK-9, surface-to-air)
- Flight altitude: 4.5km (surface-to-air)
- Maximum speed: Mach 2+
- Guidance system: multi-element infrared
- Launch platform: Aircraft, helicopter gunships, ground-launched

The PL-9 (Chinese: 霹雳-9; pinyin: Pī Lì-9; lit. 'Thunderbolt-9') is a short-range, infrared-homing air-to-air missile (AAM) developed by the People's Republic of China. The missile was developed by integrating the PL-5 and PL-7 airframes with the PL-8's targeting seeker. It was later succeeded by the PL-10.

== History ==
The PL-9 program was initiated in 1986. The missile entered batch production in 1989. Two improved variants, PL-9B and PL-9C, was certified in 1992 and 2002. The latest version of the PL-9 is PL-9D.

The missile was originally designed by Dong Bingyin (董秉印) at the Luoyang Electro Optical Center, which is also known as Institute 612 and renamed in 2002 as the China Air-to-Air Guided Missile Research Institute (中国空空导弹研究院). After Dong Bingyin died, his position was succeeded by Mr. Jin Xianzhong (金先仲). The deputy general designer of PL-9 is the same deputy general designer of PL-12, Dr. Liang Xiaogeng (梁晓庚).

The PL-9C is one of the later versions of the PL-9, which also has a surface-to-air variant (DK-9). The PL-9C tactical low-altitude surface-to-air missile (SAM) was first revealed during the 1989 Paris Air Show. The launch unit is available in both towed and self-propelled arrangements. The self-propelled version has a launch complex consisting four-rail launcher and the associated target acquisition and radar and electro-optical director mounted on a 6X6 WZ551 armored personnel carrier (APC). The towed version has a four-rail launcher mounted on a four-wheel carriage. The launch unit is supported by a range of truck-mounted ground equipment for maintenance and missile testing.

== Design ==
The PL-9 utilizes the airframe modified from the PL-5 and PL-7 missile. The seeker head is fitted with sensors from PL-8 and Python-3 missile. The missile is fitted with a cryogenic liquid nitrogen gas-cooled IR seeker capable of +/-40 degree off boresight angles. Flight control is by long span pointed delta fins at the front of the missile with Sidewinder-type slipstream driven rollerons on the aft tail fin surfaces to prevent roll and so enhance the operation of the guidance system. The missile has a maximum effective range of 35 km, although a hit at such a range is unlikely, as maximum effective range calculations tend to assume a meeting engagement against a target flying at high altitude straight at the missile, minimizing the range the missile itself needs to cover. The single-shot hit probability for a single missile launch at an approaching target is 90%. The missile can be used at a stand-alone system, or as a part of the Type 390 (DK-9) brigade (regiment)-level combined AAA/SAM air defence system. The missile entered production in 1991 and saw limited service with the PLA ground forces.

== Variants ==
PL-9
PL-9B
PL-9C
PL-9D
DK-9
PL-9 modified surface-to-air missile.

== Operators ==
=== Current operators ===
Bangladesh

- Bangladesh Air Force (BAF)

Namibia

- Namibian Air Force

Nigeria

- Nigerian Air Force

Pakistan

- Pakistan Air Force (PAF)

China

- People's Liberation Army Air Force
- People's Liberation Army Naval Air Force

== See also ==
- PL-5
- PL-7
- PL-8
- PL-10
