= PL-10 =

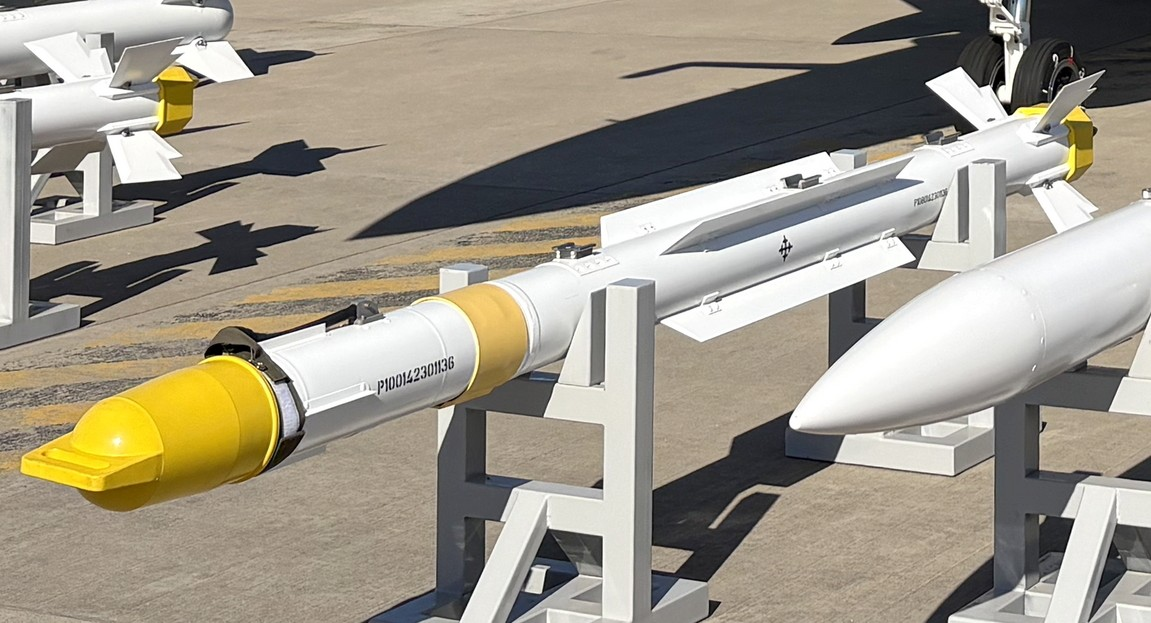
- PL-10 with its infrared sensor covered
- Type: Short-range air-to-air missile
- Place of origin: People's Republic of China

Service history
- In service: 2015–present
- Used by: People's Liberation Army Air Force Pakistan Air Force

Production history
- Manufacturer: Luoyang Electro-Optics Technology Development Centre (EOTDC)
- Produced: 2013–present

Specifications
- Length: 3.0 m (9 ft 10 in)
- Diameter: 160 mm (6.3 in)
- Warhead: Blast-frag, or expanding rod (RF-fuse)
- Detonation mechanism: Laser proximity fuze and impact
- Engine: Thrust-vectoring solid-propellant rocket
- Guidance system: Multi-element imaging infrared (IIR); Active radar seeker
- Launch platform: Aircraft

The PL-10 (Chinese: 霹雳-10; pinyin: Pī Lì-10; lit. 'Thunderbolt-10', NATO reporting name: CH-AA-9), formerly known as PL-ASR (stands for PiLi-Advanced Short Range), is a short-range, infrared-homing / active radar homing air-to-air missile (AAM) developed by the People's Republic of China. It is the latest-generation Chinese short-range air-to-air missile.

== History ==
Development of the PL-10 began in 2004. The design was approved in 2010 and it entered production in 2013. The chief designer was Liang Xiaogeng (梁晓庚) of the Shanghai Academy of Science and Technology. Pictures of the PL-10, then known as the PL-ASR, appeared on the Chinese internet in 2008.

== Design ==
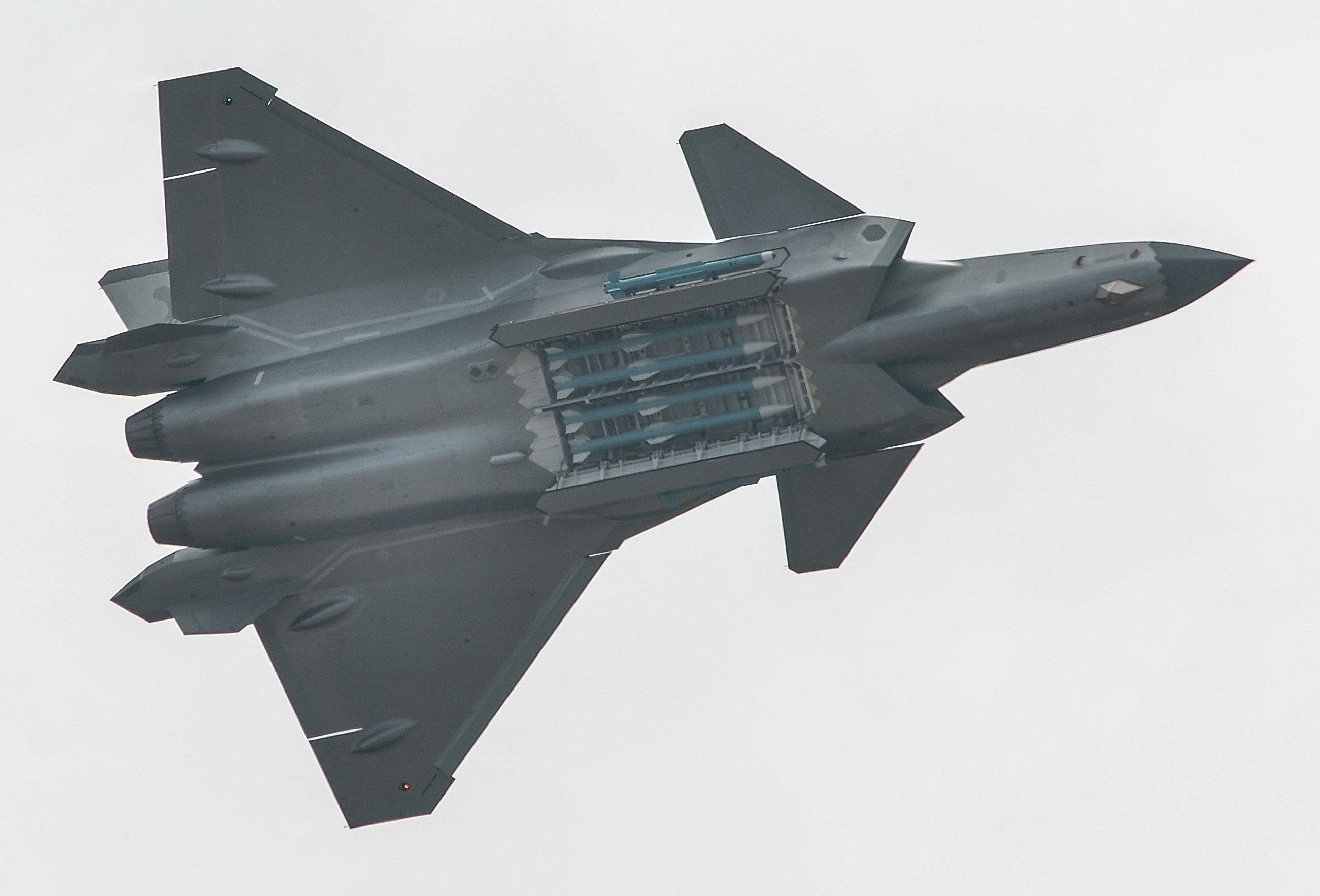
A J-20 with PL-10 missiles visible, extended from the side weapons bay

The PL-10 may be partially based on the South African A-Darter AAM. It uses an imaging infrared (IIR) sensor; these generally improve detection range and resistance to countermeasures. The PL-10E has all-aspect targeting capability using an IIR sensor that images the entire target. The seeker is reportedly very resistant to jamming and electronic countermeasures.

The IIR seeker may track targets +/-90 degree off boresight angles. It may be slaved to a helmet-mounted display (HMD); the missile may be fired at a target that is visually sighted by the pilot ("look and shoot") and outside the aircraft's radar scan envelope. The missile may lock-on after launch (LOAL) and receive targeting data through a datalink while in flight.

Flight is controlled by a thrust-vector controlled solid rocket motor and free-moving control wings on the missile's tail, which facilitate the missile to achieve turn capability of over 60Gs and high angles of attack.

According to the assessment by Royal United Services Institute, the PL-10 provides comparable performance to European ASRAAM and IRIS-T missiles. According to aviation researcher Justin Bronk, the overall capability of the PL-10 reaches an approximate parity with Western systems and surpasses Russian technologies.

== Variants ==
PL-10
Original version
PL-10E
Export version. The first potential buyer was Pakistan, for use with its JF-17 Block III program.
PL-10 Active Radar
A PL-10 variant replacing the IIR seeker with a miniature active radar. It features a new radome, improving aerodynamic efficiency and range. The variant was first observed in 2022.

== See also ==
- AAM-5 (Japanese missile) – (Japan)
- Bozdoğan – (Turkey)
- PL-8 – (China)
- PL-9 – (China)
- AIM-9X – (United States)
- ASRAAM – (United Kingdom)
- IRIS-T – (Germany, Italy, Sweden, Greece)
- MICA – (France)
