= PL-8 (missile) =

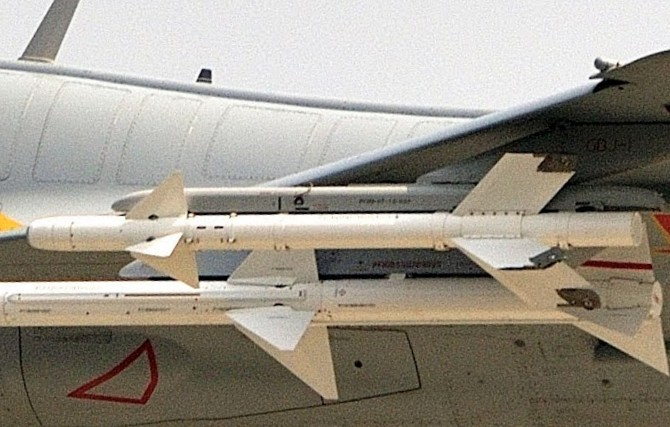
- A PL-8 missile mounted under the wing of a J-10A
- Type: Short-range air-to-air missile; Surface-to-air missile (land-based version)
- Place of origin: China

Service history
- In service: 1988 to present
- Used by: China

Production history
- Manufacturer: Xi'an Eastern Machinery Factory and CATIC
- Produced: PL-8A: 1988 to 1990’s

Specifications
- Mass: 115 kg (254 lb)
- Length: 2.95 m (9 ft 8 in)
- Diameter: 160 mm (6 in)
- Wingspan: 800 mm (31 in)
- Warhead: 11 kg (24 lb) high explosive
- Detonation mechanism: Impact / Proximity
- Engine: Solid rocket
- Propellant: Solid fuel
- Operational range: 20 km (12 mi)
- Flight ceiling: 21 km (13 mi)
- Flight altitude: .5 km (0.31 mi) minimum
- Maximum speed: ≈ Mach 3.5
- Guidance system: Passive infrared homing
- Launch platform: Aerial and ground

The PL-8 (Chinese: 霹雳-8; pinyin: Pī Lì-8; lit. 'Thunderbolt-8') is a Chinese short-range air-to-air missile (AAM) originated from the Israeli Python-3 AAM. Experience gained from PL-8/Python-3 had helped China greatly in developing its next missile, the PL-9. The PL-8B, the latest version of the missile, continues to be widely used and is succeeded and complemented by the new PL-10 missile.

== Development and history ==
The performance of Israeli Python-3 anti-air missile in the Lebanon conflict was observed by the Chinese military, People's Liberation Army Air Force (PLAAF) was reportedly impressed with this missile, and paid for licensed production as the PL-8 AAM in the 1980s, with the plan of producing the Python-3 with 100% local components approved by the PLAAF in 1982. The technology transfer accelerated Chinese missile development in the late Cold War. The program was code-named "Number 8 Project" (八号工程) and formally started on September 15, 1983. The missile entered service in 1986.

The domestic manufacturer of the missile was Xi'an Eastern Machinery Factory (西安东方机械厂) located in Xi'an. PL-8 was manufactured in Luoyang (014 Bass) also known as Institute 612 and renamed in 2002 as the China Air-to-Air Guided Missile Research Institute (中国空空导弹研究院). From March 1988 to April 1989, technology transfer to China was complete while license assembly and license-built parts continued, and by the spring of 1989, the complete domestic Chinese-built missile received state certification.

In 1993, improved and domestically built PL-8A entered service. In 1994, PL-8A entered mass production. PL-8B, a PL-8 variant made of 100% domestic Chinese components, began development in 1984, the development was completed in 1989.'

The PL-8B variant consisted of several upgrades, including the seeker which now features IRCCM (Infrared Counter-Counter Measures) allowing it to have a much higher hit probability. Along with the seeker upgrade it got a motor upgrade, allowing the PL-8B to have much longer range compared the Python 3.

== Design ==
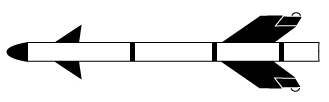
Design of the Python-3

The missile features wide off-boresight targeting sight with a dual-thrust solid rocket motor, giving it a speed of Mach 4. The missile can maneuver at over 38Gs with a guidance precision of less than 1 meter.

China has also developed a helmet-mounted sight (HMS) system for the PL-8, giving it "look and shoot" capability. It's possibly a license-produced Elbit Systems DASH (Display And Sight Helmet) helmet-mounted sight or its domestic development. However, it's not clear if this was part of the Python-3 deal or a separate deal instead.

The seeker of the original Python-3 AAM was able to be slaved to either the airborne fire control radars or DASH HMS. These capabilities initially did not exist on PL-8 at the earlier stage of its service in Chinese hands, because the missile is only compatible with western radars, but not with Chinese radars. The only exception was that capability of being slaved to airborne fire control radars could be achieved by PL-8 only when it is used in conjunction with the few western radars in Chinese inventory, such as the British GEC-Marconi Skyranger airborne radar and Italian FIAR Grifo series airborne radar on Chengdu J-7, but for the most part, the seeker of PL-8 could only be fixed, pointing to the front when deployed on aircraft with domestic Chinese radars. These capabilities would not be fully achieved until the advent of PL-9, the next Chinese AAM, when the missile became compatible not only with western radars, but also with Chinese and Russian radars as well, and these capabilities of PL-9 were eventually re-incorporated into PL-8 AAMs in its upgrades so that PL-8 is fully capable as Python-3.

== Versions ==
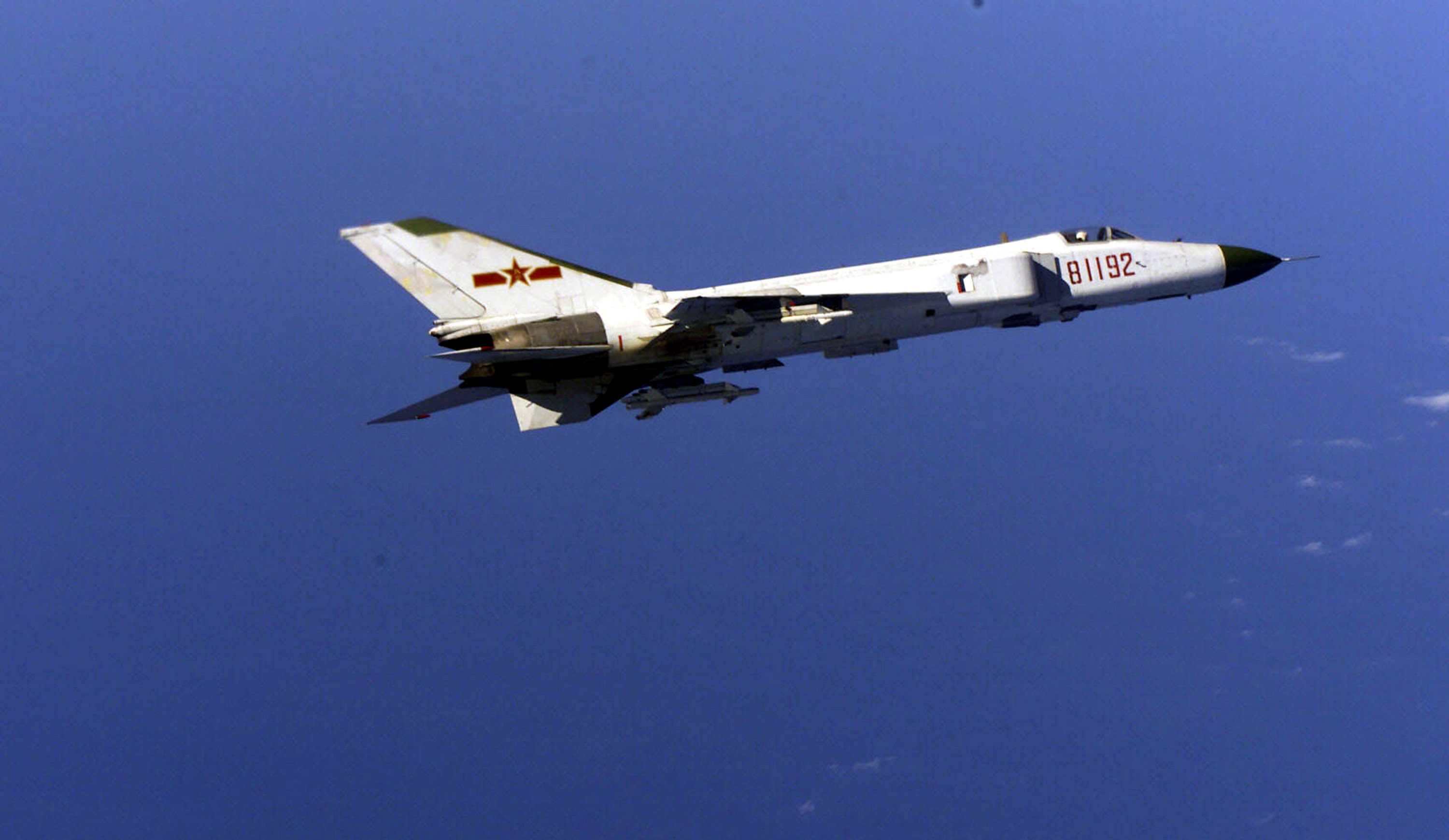
Two PL-8 AAMs are spotted clearly on a Chinese Navy's Shenyang J-8 interceptor

Unlike the conventional Chinese designation practice where a missile is given a Chinese name after at least 70% of it is made in China, Python 3 received a Chinese name at the very beginning, receiving PL-8 when it was purchased. It was speculated that China did so because it did not want to further reveal its tie with Israel, so that the original Israeli name was replaced with a Chinese one to avoid harming the relationship between Chinese and Muslim countries.

As the PL-8/Python 3 AAM has a wing span much larger than the PL-2/PL-5 (which has dimensions similar to the AIM-9 Sidewinder), Chinese fighter jets were modified to carry extended pylons capable of carrying PL-8 missiles. The wingtip pylons of the J-15 carrier-based fighter jet are also extended for this purpose, and has become a notable visual difference between the J-15 compared to the Su-33.

- PL-8: Python 3 AAM provided by Israel
- PL-8A: License assembled AAM in China with Israeli supplied components, and later with all Chinese components.
- PL-8B: Improved PL-8A AAM with 100% domestic Chinese components. It is compatible with Chinese helmet-mounted sights. These helmet-mounted sights are available with the Chengdu J-10, the Flanker series (Sukhoi Su-27 family aircraft) and the Chengdu J-20. This provides dynamic high-off-boresight targeting capability via the pilot looking at the target for the missile to acquire it.
- PL-8H: Surface-to-air version with slightly smaller warhead weighing 10 kg.

The surface-to-air version is developed by China National Aero-Technology Import & Export Corporation (CATIC). According to the developers, there are minor improvements incorporated in each version, but they have not specified the exact upgrades.

== User ==
- China
  - People's Liberation Army Air Force: Known to be used by the J-8, J-10 and the J-20.
  - People's Liberation Army Navy Air Force
