= PL-7 =

Short-range air-to-air missile

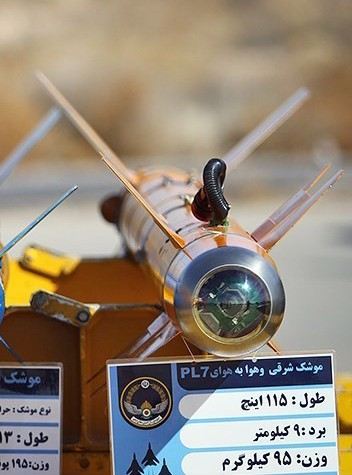
An Iranian PL-7 missile

The PL-7 (Chinese: 霹雳-7; pinyin: Pī Lì-7; lit. 'Thunderbolt-7') is the PRC version of the French Magic R.550 short-range air-to-air missile. It is a short-range, infrared homing missile used by Chinese fighter aircraft. It was designed by Wu Shendao, and produced at the Factory 331 (Zhuzhou Aeroengine factory) (中国株洲航空发动机厂).

== Specifications ==
- Length - 2.74 m (9 ft)
- Diameter - 157 mm (6.2 in)
- Wingspan - 0.66 m (26 in)
- Weight - 89 kg (196.2 lb)
- Warhead - 12.5 kg (27.55 lb)
- Speed - Mach 2.5 (1,917.5 mph, 3,086 kmh, 1,666.26 kn)
- Range - 0.5 to 14 km (0.31 to 8.7 mi, 0.27 to 7.55 nmi)
- Guidance - Infrared homing

== Operational history ==
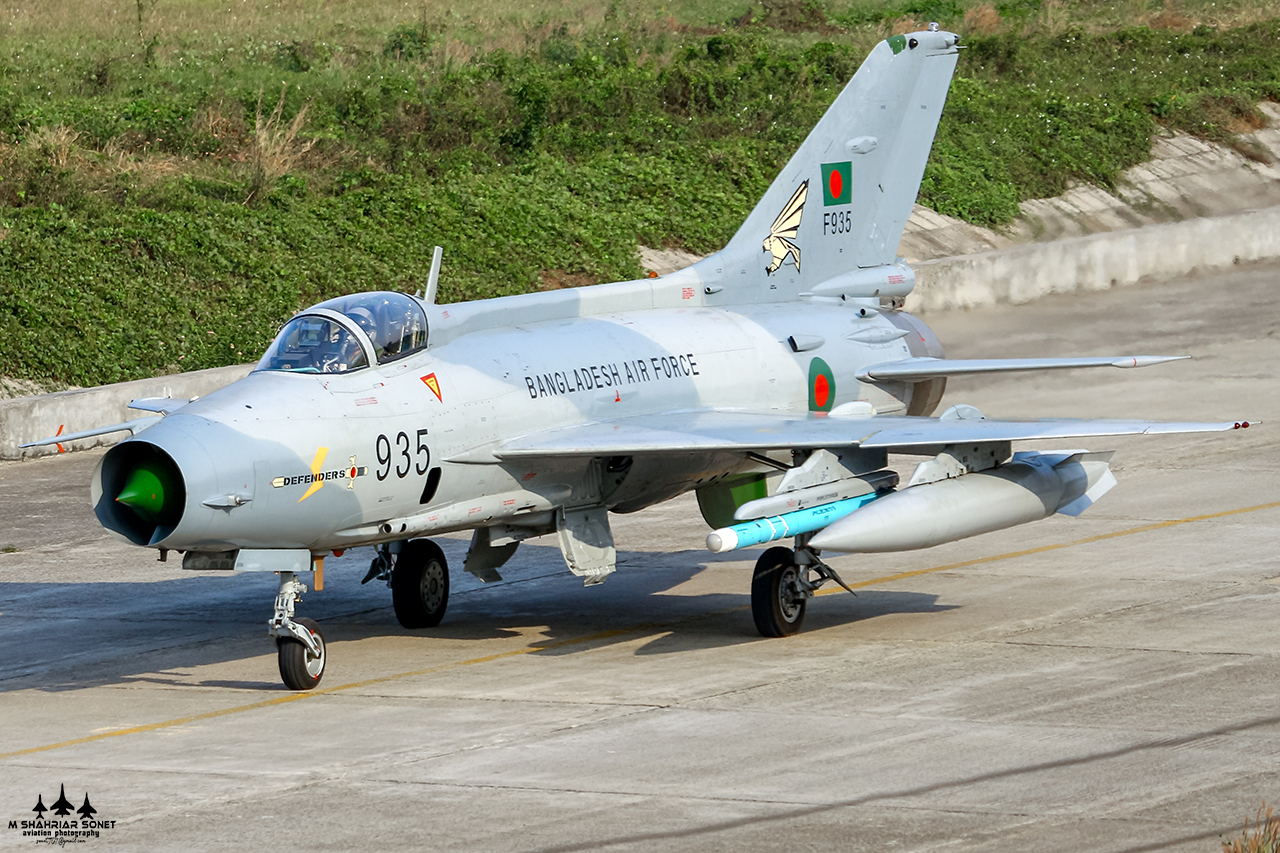
Bangladesh Air Force F-7BG carrying PL-7 missile

During the late 1998–2001 Zimbabwean intervention in the Second Congo War, Air Force of Zimbabwe BAE Hawks were reportedly modified to be armed with PL-7s for air interception missions in support of Zimbabwean and Laurent Kabila's government forces.

== Operators ==
Bangladesh

- Bangladesh Air Force

China

- People's Liberation Army Air Force

Iran

- Iranian Air Force: Received at least 400 PL-7s.

Democratic People's Republic of Korea

- Korean People's Army Air Force

Myanmar

- Myanmar Air Force

Sudan

- Sudanese Air Force
