= PAC-nBook 1 =

- Developer: Pakistan Aeronautical Complex and INNAVTEK
- Manufacturer: PAC
- Type: Netbook
- Released: 2012
- Introductory price: PKR 23,500 (US$261)
- Operating system: Windows 7
- CPU: Intel Atom N450 1.66GHz
- Memory: 1GB DDR2
- Storage: 160 GB SATA HDD
- Display: 10.1-inch WXGA
- Graphics: Intel(R) Graphics Media Accelerator 3150
- Sound: Stereo
- Input: Microphone
- Controller input: 3x USB 2.0
- Camera: 1.3MP HD Motion eye
- Touchpad: Yes
- Connectivity: Wi-Fi
- Power: 3 cell/2200ma,65W,3pin
- Dimensions: 266*180*33m
- Weight: 1.2kg~1.4 kg with battery
- Website: www.cpmc.pk

The PAC-nBook 1 is a netbook developed by the Pakistan Aeronautical Complex which was released in early 2012.

== Development ==
The project was being developed since 2010 by the PAC in conjunction with INNAVTEK, a Hong Kong-based electronic parts manufacture.

== Release ==
The n-Book was publicly launched in December 2011 and since then has entered production at a factory in Kamra, Pakistan

== Sister products ==
Along with releasing the nBook the PAC also unveiled the

- PAC-PAD 1 – an Android tablet
- PAC-eBook 1 – an e-book reader
