= Malmö Flygindustri =

Aviation company in South Sweden

Malmö Flygindustri was a small aviation and car company in south Sweden which specialized in small single-propeller aircraft and various plastic objects. It was later acquired by SAAB.

== Products ==
Aircraft

- MFI-9
- MFI-10 Vipan
- BA-12 Sländan
- BA-14 Starling
- Saab Safari

Automobiles

- Saab Sonett
