= PAC MFI-17 Mushshak =

Pakistani basic trainer aircraft

MFI-17 Mushshak MFI-395 Super Mushshak
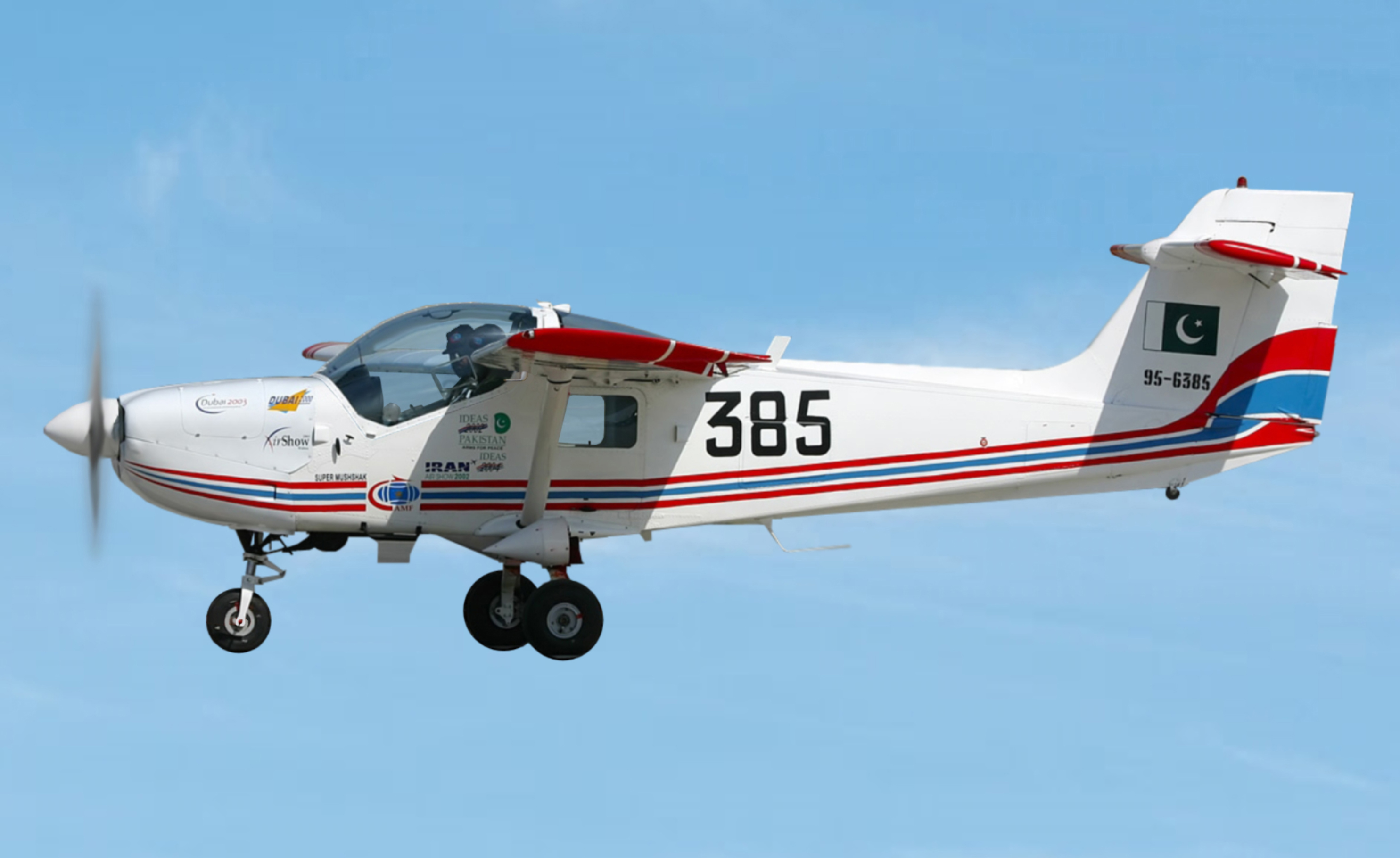
- A PAC MFI-17 Mushshak in flight

General information
- Type: Basic training aircraft, Light attack aircraft
- National origin: Pakistan
- Manufacturer: Pakistan Aeronautical Complex
- Status: In service
- Primary users: Pakistan Air Force Turkish Air Force; Islamic Republic of Iran Air Force; Royal Saudi Air Force; Iraqi Air Force
- Number built: 535

History
- Manufactured: 1981–present
- First flight: 1981
- Developed from: Saab Safari

The PAC MFI-17 Mushshak and PAC MFI-395 Super Mushshak (Urdu: مشاق, lit. 'Proficient') is a fixed-gear piston-engine primary trainer aircraft manufactured by Pakistan Aeronautical Complex (PAC). An improved and heavily modified version of the Saab Safari (MFI-15), the MFI-17 is manufactured in Kamra, Pakistan, by the PAC. Built to Mil-Spec and fully aerobatic, it is used for training, towing and other ground-support roles. An upgraded version, the PAC Super Mushshak, has also been produced by PAC.

As of 2022, there were 477 MFI-15/17/395 in use, making it one of the most commonly used training aircraft in the world.

== Development ==
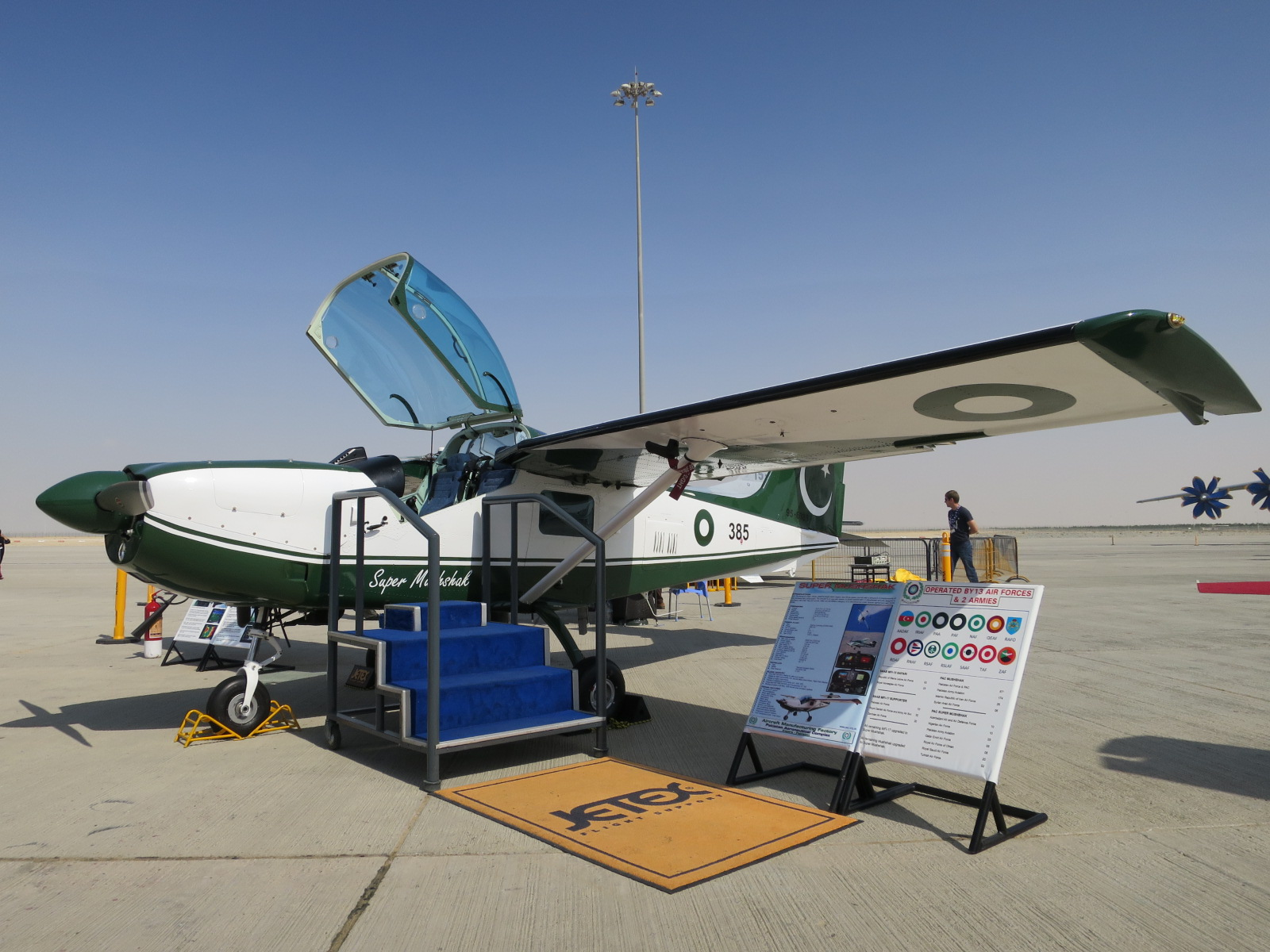
PAC Super Mushshak at Dubai Airshow, 2017

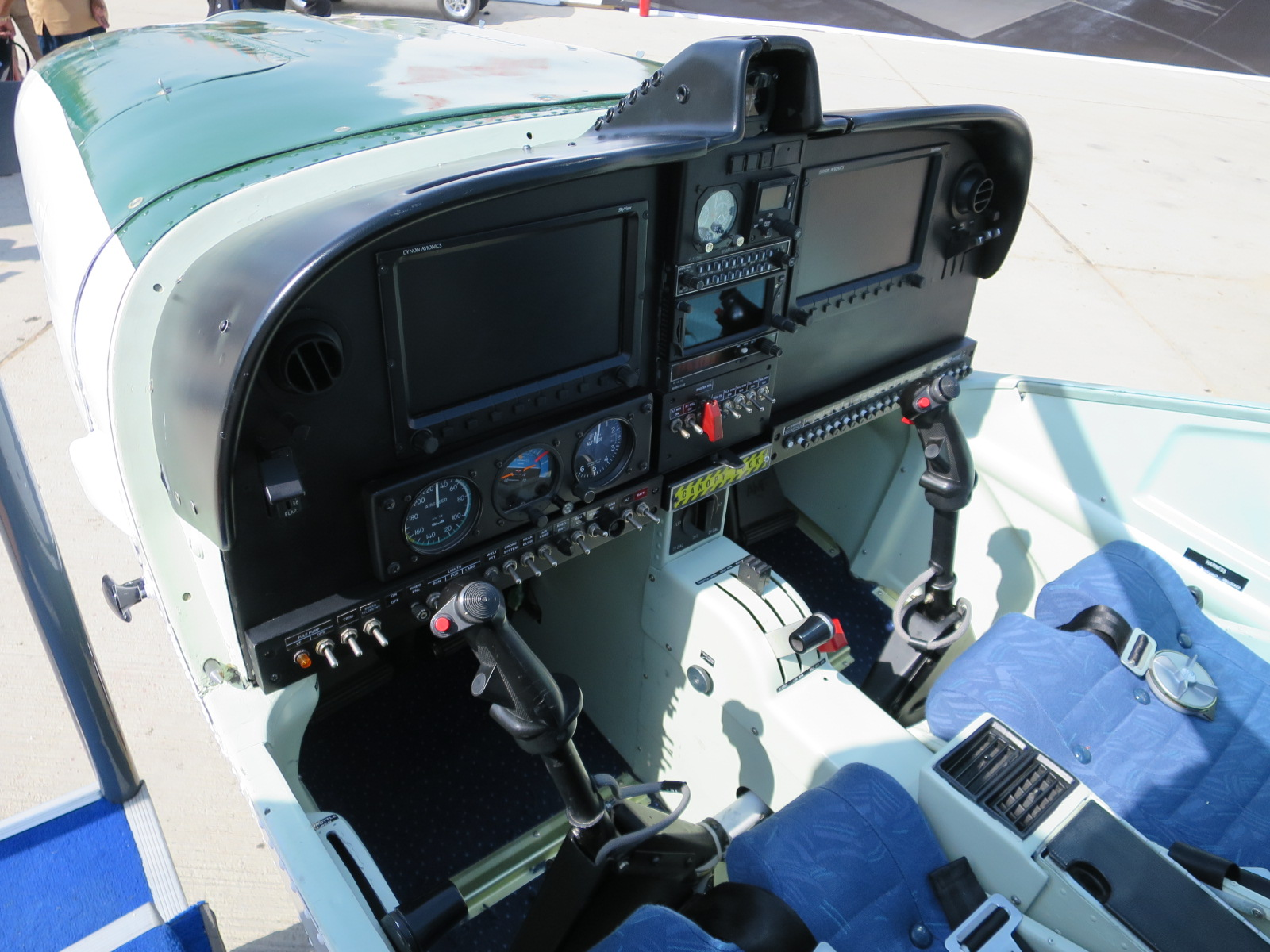
PAC Super Mushshak cockpit at Dubai Airshow, 2017

The MFI-15 Safari and MFI-17 Supporter were created from Saab's adaptation of the MFI-9 Junior for basic training for civil and military operators. In 1968 Saab began work on its MFI-15, based on the MFI-9 but with some design changes. Foremost among the changes in the Saab-built MFI-15 prototype was the 120 kW (160shp) Lycoming IO-320 piston engine. Like the MFI-9, the MFI-15 retained the unusual braced, mid-mounted and slightly forward-swept wing and rearward-hinged canopy, offering good all-around vision. The prototype made its maiden flight on June 11, 1969. Follow-up testing of the MFI-15 resulted in a more powerful IO-360 engine, while the horizontal tail was relocated to prevent it being damaged by thrown up debris. The first flight of this modified form was in February 1971.

Sold as the MFI-15 Safari, most went to civil customers, however Sierra Leone and Norway took delivery of Safaris for military pilot training. To improve the Safari's military market appeal, Saab developed the MFI-17 Supporter, fitted with six underwing hardpoints for light and practice weaponry, giving it weapons training and light COIN capabilities. First flight was on July 6, 1972. Important were Denmark and Zambia. Production ended in the late 1970s after about 250 Safaris and Supporters had been built, mostly for civil customers.

Pakistan has taken delivery of 18 Supporters, while 92 have been assembled locally by PAC from knocked down kits and a further 149 were built locally by PAC. It is named Mushshak ("Proficient") in Pakistani service. In 1981, Pakistan acquired sole manufacturing rights to the Supporter. The development of the MFI-395 in 1995 was initiated by the then-managing director of AMF, Air Cdr Muhammad Younas. The aircraft was built by upgrading the MFI-17 with an advanced 260 hp engine, electrical instruments, dual flight control systems and a Bendix RSA fuel injection system.

As of 2022, there were 477 MFI-15/17/395 in use, making it one of the most commonly used training aircraft in the world.

== Design ==
Fitted with an American 260 hp engine, cockpit air conditioning, electrical instruments, and electric/manual elevator and rudder trim, the aircraft has been developed to meet FAR part 23 certification in normal, utility and aerobatics categories. It has a spacious side-by-side cockpit allowing good contact between the pilot and the co-pilot/observer or between the student and the instructor.

== Variants ==
- MFI-17 Mushshak
- MFI-395 Super Mushshak — Pakistan Aeronautical Complex unveiled a light attack variant of the Super Mushshak in March 2019. The aircraft is capable of launching Barq laser-guided and anti-tank missiles. The Super Mushshak is in use by several countries, including the Pakistan Air Force, Azerbaijani Air Force and the Nigerian Air Force.

== Operators ==
=== Current operators ===
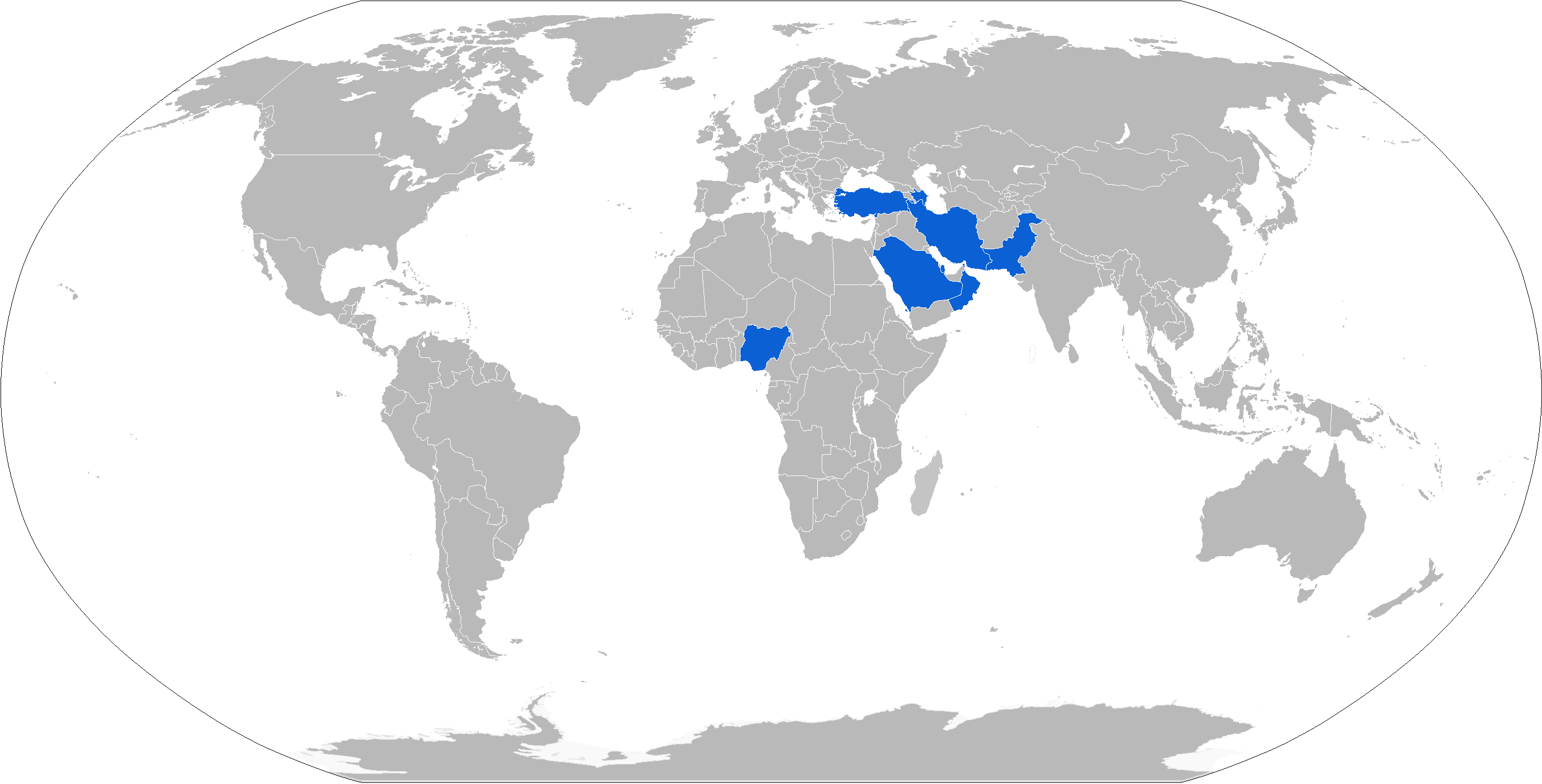
Map with current Super Mushshak operators in blue

Azerbaijan

- Azerbaijani Air and Air Defence Force: 10 MFI-395 Super Mushshak delivered

Iran

- Islamic Republic of Iran Air Force: 25

Iraq

- Iraqi Air Force: 12 MFI-395 Super Mushshak delivered (additional 12 on order). 2nd batch of two aircraft delivered on 19 April 2023 to 202nd Training Squadron at Balad Air Base, Iraq.

Nigeria

- Nigerian Air Force: 10 MFI-395 Super Mushshak delivered as of January 2018. Nigeria temporarily operated four Pakistani Air Force Super Mushshaks for early training. The contract included the deployment of Pakistani pilots and technicians to assist the Nigerians.

Oman

- Royal Air Force of Oman: 8

Pakistan

- Approximately 368 operational with the Pakistan Armed Forces - 217 with Pakistan Army, 151 Super Mushshak with Pakistan Air Force (4 Super Mushshak were loaned temporarily to Nigeria)

Qatar

- Qatar Emiri Air Force: 8 MFI-395 Super Mushshak delivered, first batch of 4 delivered in July 2017

Saudi Arabia

- Royal Saudi Air Force: 20 MFI-395 Super Mushshak delivered

Turkey

- Turkish Air Force: 52 MFI-395 Super Mushshak delivered

=== Future operators ===
Bangladesh

- Bangladesh Air Force – Unspecified MFI-395 Super Mushshak on order

Uzbekistan

- Uzbekistan Air and Air Defence Forces: 16 MFI-395 Super Mushshak on order

Zimbabwe

- Air Force of Zimbabwe: 12 MFI-395 Super Mushshak on order

=== Former operators ===
Syria

- Syrian Air Force - 6. The Syrian government of Al-Assad fell to rebels in late 2024, and the Syrian Arab Air Force was dismantled. It was re-established as Syrian Air Force, but the revolution, and the Israeli air strikes that followed it, wrecked havoc in the inventory of the Air Force. In late 2025, the World Air Forces publication by FlightGlobal, which tracks the aircraft inventories of world's air forces and publishes its counts annually, removed all Syrian Air Force's aircraft from their World Air Forces 2026 report. It is thus questionable if the Syrian Air Force has any flying aircraft in their inventory, and in particular, any MFI-17, as of December 2025.

== Accidents ==
The aircraft has been involved in a few notable crashes:

- 2012: In April, a Mushshak aircraft with a major and a captain on board was on a routine training flight when it crashed due to technical issues in Gujranwala, Pakistan.
- 2016: In February, a Mushshak trainer crashed during a routine training flight near Gujranwala, killing the instructor and the trainee pilot.
- 2020: In April, a Mushshak crashed during a routine training mission near Gujrat. Major Umer, an instructor pilot, and Lieutenant Faizan, a trainee pilot, were killed during the crash.
- 2024: A Mushshak trainer aircraft that took off from Risalpur Asghar Khan Academy developed a technical issue. The pilots resorted to a forced landing in a field, in Nowshera. The aircraft's nose gear collapsed during the landing but the pilot and co-pilot were unhurt.
- 2026: On June 15, 2026, a Super Mushshak aircraft crashed during a routine training mission near Mardan. Flight Lieutenant Muhammad Qasim Abdullah, the instructor pilot, and Lieutenant Taha Abbasi, the student pilot, were both killed.
- 2026: On October 12, 2026, a Super Mushshak training aircraft belonging to Pakistan Army’s aviation wing crashed due to a ‘technical fault’

== Specifications (MFI-17 Mushshak) ==
Data from Jane's All the World's Aircraft 1988–89, Jane's All The World's Aircraft 1993–94, Pakistan Aeronautical Complex, Jane's All The World's Aircraft 2003–2004

General characteristics

- Crew: 2-3
- Length: 7 m (23 ft 0 in)
- Wingspan: 8.85 m (29 ft 0 in)
- Height: 2.6 m (8 ft 6 in)
- Wing area: 11.9 m^{2} (128 sq ft)
- Airfoil: NACA 23012 mod
- Empty weight: 646 kg (1,424 lb) equipped
- Max takeoff weight: 1,200 kg (2,646 lb) normal

1,125 kg (2,480 lb) utility
900 kg (1,984 lb) aerobatic

- Powerplant: 1 × Textron Lycoming IO-360-A1B6 4-cylinder air-cooled horizontally-opposed piston engine, 149 kW (200 hp)
- Propellers: 2-bladed Hartzell HC-C2YK-4F/FC7666A-2, 1.88 m (6 ft 2 in) diameter constant-speed metal propeller

Performance

- Maximum speed: 236 km/h (147 mph, 127 kn) at sea level and 1,125 kg (2,480 lb)
- Cruise speed: 210 km/h (130 mph, 110 kn)
- Stall speed: 100 km/h (62 mph, 54 kn)
- Never exceed speed: 365 km/h (227 mph, 197 kn) at 1,125 kg (2,480 lb)
- Endurance: 5 hours 10 minutes at 65% power, at sea level, with 10% fuel reserve
- Service ceiling: 4,100 m (13,500 ft)
- g limits:

+4.4 -1.76 (utility MTOW)
+6 -2 (aerobatic MTOW)

- Rate of climb: 5.2 m/s (1,020 ft/min)
- Time to altitude: 1,830 m (6,004 ft) in 9 minutes 18 seconds

Armament

- Hardpoints: 6× under-wing, maximum external load 300 kg (660 lb) total
- Possible loads:
  - 2× 7.62 mm machine gun pods
  - 2× 75 mm unguided rocket pod (7 rounds)
  - 4× 68 mm unguided rocket pod (7 rounds)
  - 6× wire-guided anti-tank missiles (ATGMs)
  - Barq Air To Ground Guided Missiles

== See also ==
Related development

- Saab Safari
