= PAC-PAD Takhti 7 =

Pakistani tablet computer

- Developer: PAC & INNAVTEK
- Manufacturer: PAC & INNAVTEK
- Type: Tablet computer
- Introductory price: PKR 15,500 ($165 USD)
- Operating system: Android 4.0 Ice Cream Sandwich
- CPU: 1 GHz Cortex-A8
- Memory: 512 MB RAM
- Display: 7″ Multi-touch Capacitive Color Display
- Input: Multi-touch
- Connectivity: Wi-Fi 802.11 b/g connectivity
- Predecessor: PAC PAD 1
- Website: www.cpmc.pk/products/pac-pad-takhti-7

The PAC-PAD Takhti 7 is a tablet-computer offered by Pakistan Aeronautical Complex developed in conjuncture with INNAVTEK, the Takhti differs from its sister product PAC PAD 1 because it has double RAM and a dual-core ARM Cortex-A8 processor, the Takhti uses Android Ice Cream Sandwich instead of Android Gingerbread used by the PAC-PAD 1. In 2012, it was priced at PKR 12500 ($120 USD), including warranty and multiple covers/casings for the device.

== Features ==
- Processor: 1 GHz Cortex-A8
- Operating System: Android OS 4.0
- Memory: 512 MB RAM
- Micro SD Card: Up to 32 GB
- Display: 7" inch, 800x480 resolution
- Connectivity: Wi-Fi: 802.11 b/g
- USB: Mini-USB 2.0
- HDMI: HDMI support available
- Miscellaneous: G-sensor, 3.5mm earphone jack
- Software & Games: Word, Excel, Powerpoint
- Supported audio formats: MP3, WMA, AAC, WAV
- Supported video formats: AVI, MKV, WMV, MOV, MP4, MPEG, MPG, FLV
- Supported image formats: JPG, BMP, PNG, GIF highest support 4096x4096
- Other supported formats: PDF, TXT
- Supports online games, online video streaming

== See also ==
- PAC-PAD 1
- PAC-eBook 1
- Pakistan Aeronautical Complex
