= PAC-PAD 1 =

Android tablet computer

- Developer: PAC & INNAVTEK
- Manufacturer: PAC & INNAVTEK
- Type: Tablet computer
- Introductory price: PKR 15,500
- Operating system: Android 2.3
- CPU: 1 GHz ARM11
- Memory: 256 MB RAM
- Storage: Flash memory External: 2/4/8/16 GB flash External: 4 to 32 GB microSD slot
- Display: 7 inch 16:9 full HD 720p to 1080p
- Sound: stereo earphones; 3.5 mm jack
- Input: Multi-touch
- Camera: 0.3
- Connectivity: Wi-Fi (802.11 b/g), USB 2.0, HDMI 1.3
- Dimensions: 192 mm (7.6 in) H 128 mm (5.0 in) W 13 mm (0.51 in) D
- Weight: 385 g (13.6 oz)
- Predecessor: 2.8 GHz dual-core
- Website: www.cpmc.pk/products/pad/

The PAC-PAD 1 is the first version of an Android tablet computer developed by the Pakistan Aeronautical Complex Kamra in collaboration with Hong Kong–based INNAVTEK International. A succeeding model is being developed with cell phone network data connectivity.

INNAVTEK also provides electronics for the jet fighters that Pakistan Aeronautical Complex assembles. Shortly after the release of the PAC-PAD 1, its sister tablet PAC-PAD Takhti 7 was announced. The Takhti 7 has double the RAM and CPU speed of the PAD 1 and uses the latest Android IceCream Sandwich operating system.

== Features ==
- Processor: 1 GHz ARM11
- Operating System: Android OS 2.3
- Memory: 256 MB RAM
- Storage: Card Extendible 4 GB, 32 GB, SD/TF support
- Flash: 2/4/8/16 GB
- Dimensions: Height: 192 mm, Width: 128 mm, Depth: 13 mm
- Weight: 385 grams
- Display: 7", 16:9 Capacitive touchscreen TFT display
- Camera: 0.3 MP
- Connectivity: Wi-Fi 802.11 b/g
- USB: USB 2.0
- HDMI: HDMI standard port mini port, support for HDMI 1.3, supports full-screen output to HDMI devices
- Content Formats Supported MP3, WMA, AAC, 3GP, WAV, JPG, BMP, PNG, GIF, AVI, MKV, WMV, MOV, MP4, MPEG, MPG, FLV
- Miscellaneous G-sensor, Internal 3D acceleration, 3.5mm Earphone Jack
- Browsers: Opera, UCWeb, Skyfire, Dolphin
- Software & Games: Word, Excel, Powerpoint, 3D games can be supported by internal 3D acceleration
- Supported Audio Formats: MP3, WMA, AAC, WAV
- Supported video Formats: AVI, MKV, WMV, MOV, MP4, MPEG, MPG, FLV
- Supported Image Formats: JPG, BMP, PNG, GIF highest support 4096x4096
- Other Supported Formats: PDF, TXT
- Supported Languages: English, French, German, Italian, Japanese, Korean, Polish, Russian, Spanish, Simplified Chinese, Traditional Chinese.
- Sensor: G_Sensor
- Supports online games, online video streaming, online TV, online radio

== See also ==
- Android (operating system)
