= Saab Safari =

Trainer aircraft

MFI-15 Safari
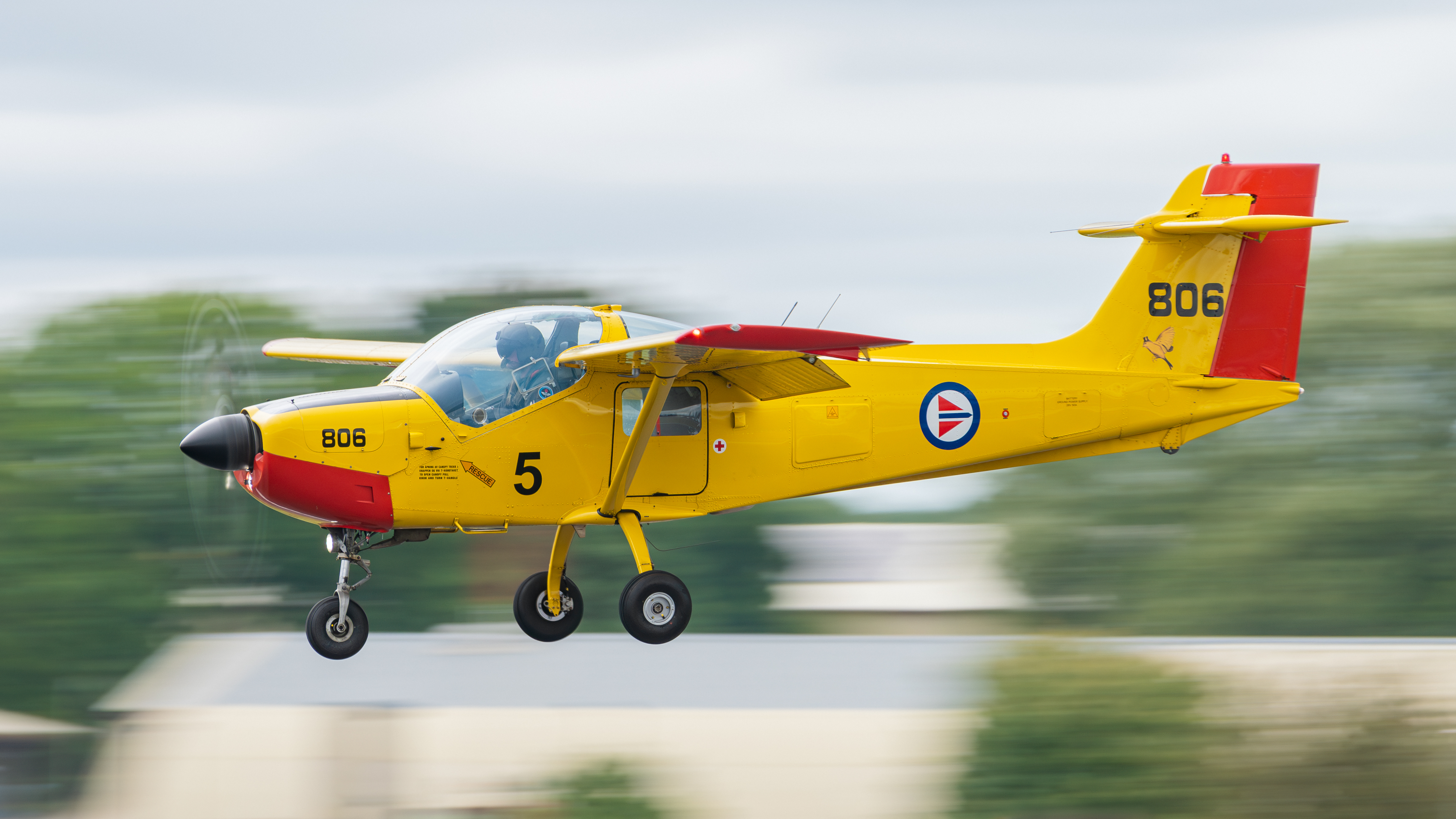
- A Royal Norwegian Air Force Saab Safari

General information
- Type: Primary trainer
- Manufacturer: Saab AB
- Designer: Malmö Flygindustri
- Status: Active
- Primary users: Danish Air Force Royal Norwegian Air Force; Pakistan Air Force
- Number built: 462

History
- Manufactured: 1971–1979
- Introduction date: 1972
- First flight: 26 February 1971
- Developed from: Malmö MFI-9 Junior
- Variant: PAC MFI-17 Mushshak

Saab MFI-15 Safari, also known as the Saab MFI-17 Supporter, is a propeller-powered basic trainer aircraft used by several air forces.

== Development and design ==
On 11 July 1969 Saab flew the prototype (SE-301) of a two/three-seat civil/military trainer or general utility aircraft allocated the designation Saab-MFI 15. Developed at Malmö Flygindustri, it was powered by a 119 kW Avco Lycoming IO-320-B2 flat-four engine and with a conventional low-set tailplane. The latter was later modified to a T-tail configuration to minimise damage when operating from rough airfields.

On 26 February 1971 the prototype was flown with the more powerful Avco Lycoming IO-360-A1B6 air-cooled flat-4 piston engine, which became the standard powerplant for the production version, now designated as the Saab Safari. A braced shoulder-wing monoplane with fixed tricycle landing gear, available optionally with tail-wheel landing gear, it provides side-by-side enclosed accommodation for two and has dual controls as standard. It has forward-swept wings so the wing root does not obscure the pilots’ view to the side. This design constraint applies also to the ARV Super2 and the Bölkow Bo 208 Junior, the latter a license-built version of the Malmö MFI-9 Junior.

A military version designated originally Saab-MFI 17 was flown on 6 July 1972 and differed from the Safari by being equipped more specifically for use as a military trainer, or for artillery observation or forward air control and liaison.; this version was later named Saab Supporter. In August 1978 Saab flew a prototype version of the Safari with a 157 kW Continental flat-six turbocharged engine; designated Safari TS, it did not enter production. A trainer based on the Safari's design was built in kit form for assembly in Pakistan as the Mushshak, with 92 aircraft delivered to the Pakistani Air Force. A later batch of 120 aircraft was built entirely in Pakistan.

Of the 250 fully assembled aircraft built by Saab, the majority were bought by private fliers. Including the 212 Pakistani CKD or locally built aircraft, a total of 462 versions of the Safari were produced. The Royal Norwegian Air Force purchased their Safaris in 1981. Today 16 of the aircraft are stationed at Bardufoss Air Station.

A variant with a stretched wing made of composite materials, the MFI-18, was tested during the 1980s in Sweden. Also fitted with provision for skis, this version never went into production. The supporter was also used as a highly efficient COIN aircraft, Experience with the earlier MFI 9B MiniCOIN during the Biafran Civil War encouraged Saab to develop the Supporter as a close support aircraft carrying an assortment of underwing stores including rockets and gun pods.

The number of Saab Safari in use as of 2022, together with its Pakistani successors (the MFI-17 Mushshak and MFI-395 Super Mushshak), is 477, making it one of the most commonly used aircraft for military training in the world.

== Variants ==
- MFI-15 Safari – original civilian variant.
- MFI-17 Supporter – Saab's designation for the military variant, Danish designation T-17.
- Saab Safari TS – a prototype fitted with a 157 kW (210 hp) turbocharged piston engine.
- MFI-17 Mushshak – improved version of MFI-17 Supporter manufactured by Pakistan Aeronautical Complex under license.
- PAC Super Mushshak – upgraded Pakistan-manufactured variant of the MFI-17 Mushshak.

== Operators ==
=== MFI-17 Supporter ===
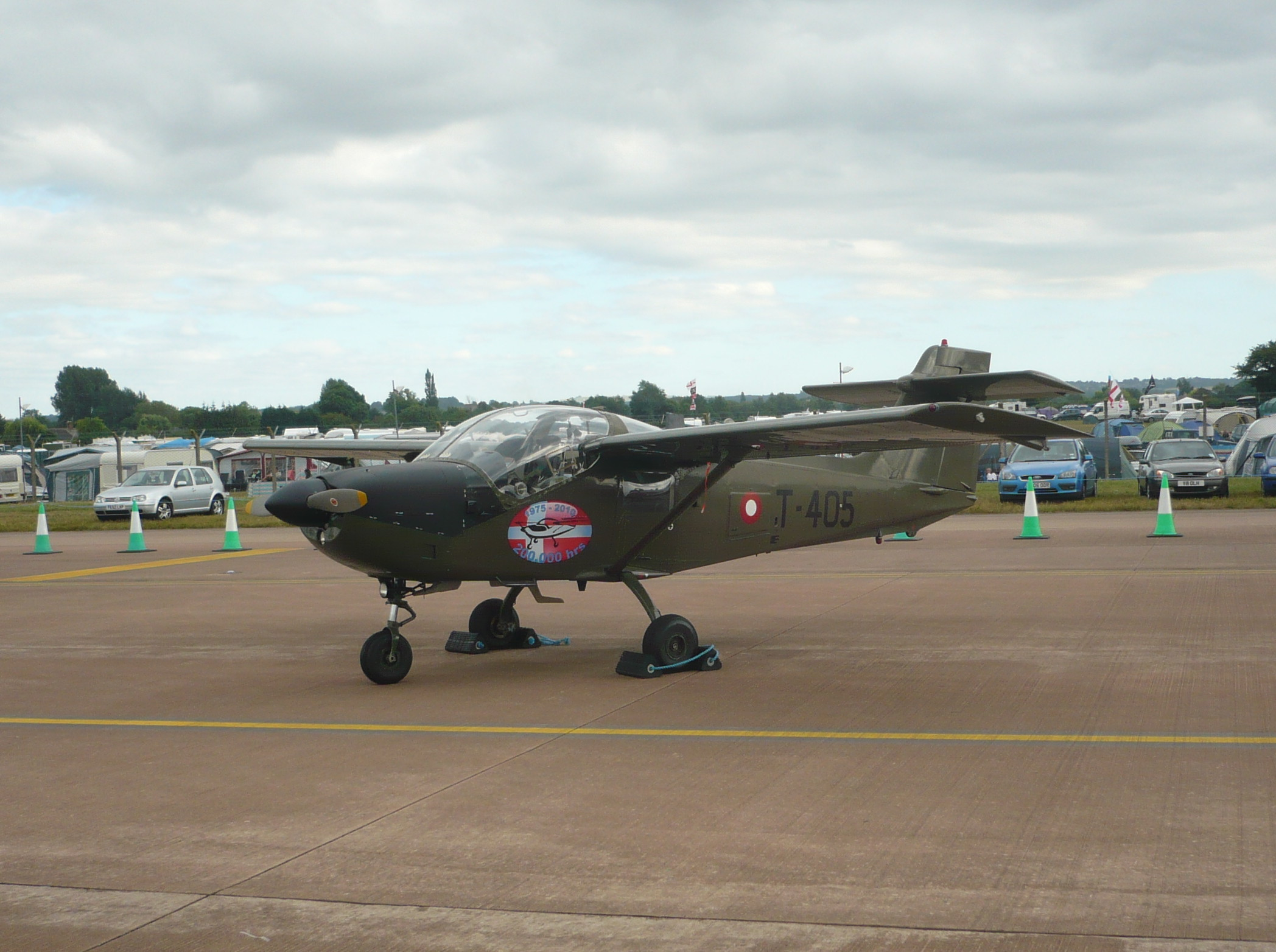
T-17 of the Royal Danish Air Force at RIAT 2010.

Denmark

- Royal Danish Air Force – 32

Norway

- Royal Norwegian Air Force – 16

Pakistan

- Pakistan Air Force – 28 delivered by Saab, 92 assembled from knock down kits

==== Former operators ====
Sierra Leone

- Sierra Leone Armed Forces – 2

Zambia

- Zambia Air Force – 20

== Specifications (Safari) ==
Data from Jane's All The World's Aircraft 1976–77

General characteristics

- Crew: 2 (pilot and student)
- Capacity: 1 passenger
- Length: 7.00 m (23 ft 0 in)
- Wingspan: 8.85 m (29 ft 0 in)
- Height: 2.60 m (8 ft 6 in)
- Wing area: 11.90 m^{2} (128.1 sq ft)
- Empty weight: 646 kg (1,424 lb)
- Gross weight: 1,200 kg (2,646 lb)
- Fuel capacity: 190 L (42 imp gal; 50 US gal)
- Powerplant: 1 × Lycoming IO-360-A1B6 air-cooled flat-four piston engine, 150 kW (200 hp)
- Propellers: 2-bladed Hartzell HC-C2YK-4F/FC7666A-2 constant speed propeller

Performance

- Maximum speed: 236 km/h (147 mph, 127 kn) at sea level
- Cruise speed: 208 km/h (129 mph, 112 kn)
- Stall speed: 107 km/h (66 mph, 58 kn) flaps down, power off
- Never exceed speed: 365 km/h (227 mph, 197 kn)
- Endurance: 5 hr 10 min
- Service ceiling: 4,100 m (13,500 ft)
- Rate of climb: 4.10 m/s (807 ft/min)
- Take-off run to 15 m (50 ft): 385 m (1,263 ft)
- Landing run from 15 m (50 ft): 390 m (1,280 ft)

== See also ==
Related development

- Malmö MFI-9
- PAC MFI-17 Mushshak
- PAC Super Mushshak

Aircraft of comparable role, configuration, and era

- ARV Super2
- Malmö MFI-9
- Saab 91 Safir
- Scottish Aviation Bulldog
- Valmet L-70 Vinka
