= MFI BA-12 Sländan =

BA-12 Sländan

General information
- Type: Single seat microlight
- National origin: Sweden
- Manufacturer: Malmö Flygindustri (MFI)
- Designer: Bjorn Andreasson
- Number built: at least 5

History
- First flight: 1984
- Variant: FFV Aerotech BA-14 Starling

The MFI BA-12 Sländan is a single seat ultralight of pod and high boom configuration and with a butterfly tail. It was designed and built in Sweden in the 1980s and led to a two-seat, slightly larger, development called the BA-14.

== Design and development ==
The Sländan (English: Dragonfly) was the first Swedish microlight apart from glider based types. It is built from composite materials, with a square section beam formed in two halves supporting the engine well ahead of the wing leading edge and extending aft continuously to the tail. The wings, rectangular in plan and with a high aspect ratio (10:1), are attached to the beam with dihedral of 1.5°. Ailerons cover 30% of the trailing edge. The wing has two pressed spars, foam filled glass fibre ribs and Kevlar filled glass fibre sandwich skins. The butterfly tail surfaces are also rectangular and assisted by a short ventral fin with the same chord as the tailplane.

The round nosed, single seat cabin is formed from six bonded pieces and mounted on the boom with its windscreen at the wing leading edge, placing the pilot below the wing at about one quarter chord. The sides are normally open though complete enclosure is an option. On each side a forward leaning bracing strut runs from the lower rear cabin to the front wing spar. The Sländan has a short, fixed, tricycle undercarriage with a steerable nosewheel; the mainwheels, fitted with brakes, are mounted on straight steel cantilever legs from the lower fuselage. There is a protective tailskid on the tip of the underfin.

The prototype Sländan was initially powered by a (21 kW (28 hp) König SD 570 4-cylinder two-stroke engine though there were plans to replace this with a Lotus Magnum 2.25 when this type became available. At least three examples have been fitted with Rotax engines.

The Sländan first flew in 1984 and by February 1985 MFI were assembling five more. It was agreed that later aircraft should be produced by the Royal Swedish Aero Club using MFI's moulds and tools. It was intended to market the Sländan in both flyaway and kit form. At about the same time, in a collaboration between MFI and FFK Aerotech, Andreasson was developing a slightly larger, two seat version called the FFV Aerotech BA-14 Starling.

== Operational history ==
Three Rotax powered, Swedish registered Sländans appear on the mid-2010 civil aircraft registers of Europe excluding Russia.

== Aircraft on display ==
Sländan SE-YKA is on display at the Aeroseum at Gothenburg City Airport.

== Variants ==
BA-12 Sländan
Single seat version.
FFV Aerotech BA-14 Starling
Side-by-side version with 48 kW (64 hp) Rotax 532 engine. Wing span increased by 1.0 m (3 ft 3 in) with more rounded tips. Flaps added. Tailplane span also increased and tips rounded, with horn balanced elevators.

== Specifications (BA-12 Sländan) ==
Data from Ultralight and Microlight Aircraft of the World

General characteristics

- Crew: 1
- Length: 5.20 m (17 ft 1 in)
- Wingspan: 10.00 m (32 ft 10 in)
- Height: 2.0 m (6 ft 7 in)
- Wing area: 10.0 m^{2} (108 sq ft)
- Aspect ratio: 10.0
- Airfoil: laminar type, 15% thickness-to-chord ratio
- Empty weight: 135 kg (298 lb)
- Max takeoff weight: 250 kg (551 lb)
- Fuel capacity: 20.0 L (5.3 US gal, 4.4 Imp gal)
- Powerplant: 1 × König SD 570 4-cylinder two-stroke, 21 kW (28 hp) at 4,200 rpm, reduced by 1.7:1 by toothed belt to propeller shaft
- Propellers: 3-bladed

Performance

- Maximum speed: 110 km/h (68 mph, 59 kn)
- Cruise speed: 100 km/h (62 mph, 54 kn) maximum
- Stall speed: 40 km/h (25 mph, 22 kn)
- Never exceed speed: 118 km/h (73 mph, 64 kn)
- Service ceiling: 1,220 m (4,000 ft) service
- g limits: +4.4/-2.2 recommended
- Rate of climb: 4.1 m/s (810 ft/min) maximum at sea level
- Wing loading: 25.0 kg/m^{2} (5.1 lb/sq ft)
- Power/mass: 8.4 W/kg (0.051 hp/lb)
- Take-off distance: 50 m
- Landing distance: 50 m
