= Malmö MFI-9 Junior =

Light single engine aircraft developed in Sweden in the 1960s

MFI-9 Junior
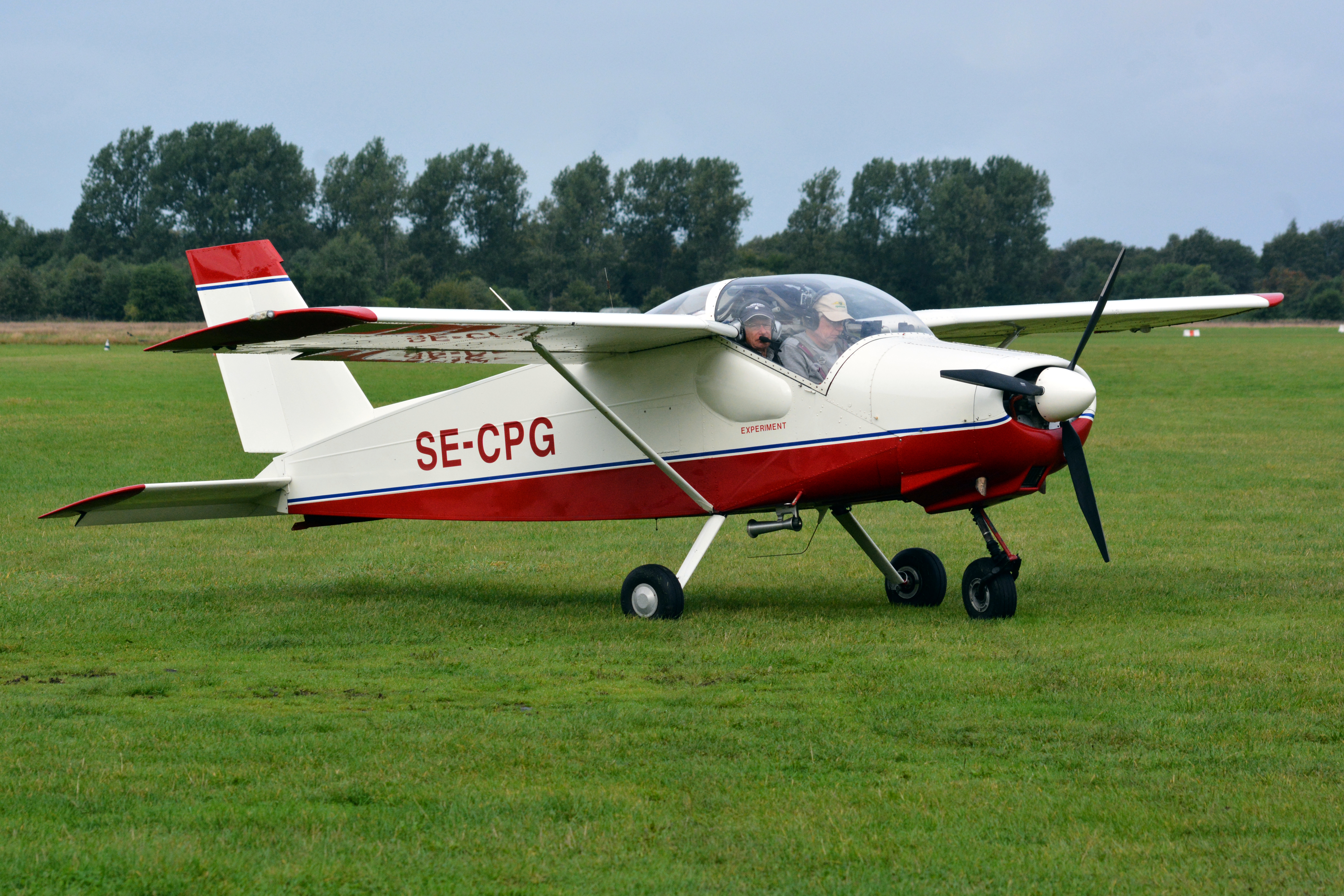
- A Malmö MFI-9, (SE-CPG), at Uetersen Airfield, Germany

General information
- Type: Primary trainer
- Manufacturer: Malmö Flygindustri
- Designer: Björn Andreasson
- Built by: Bölkow (under licence)

History
- Introduction date: 9 August 1962
- First flight: 10 October 1958
- Variant: Saab Safari

The Malmö Flygindustri MFI-9 Junior was a light aircraft produced in Sweden in the 1960s. The aircraft was also produced under licence in West Germany as the Bölkow Bo 208.

== Development ==
The BA-7 was designed by Björn Andreasson and flown by him in prototype form on 10 October 1958. He built this first plane in his spare time while working for Convair in the United States. It was powered by an air-cooled Continental A-75 engine giving 56 kW (75 hp) driving a two-bladed variable-pitch propeller. The shoulder wings were forward swept to place occupants ahead of the spar for visibility.

In 1960 Andreasson returned to Sweden and started working at Malmö Flygindustri where he designed an improved version of the BA-7 that went into production as the MFI-9 Junior. Changes included a larger cockpit and the powerplant was now a Continental O-200-A flat-four-cylinder air-cooled piston engine giving 75 kW (100 HP). In 1963 it was followed by the MFI-9B Trainer and then the MFI-9B Mili-Trainer.

The MFI-9 uses a tricycle undercarriage.

Between 1963 and 1971, 210 Bölkow Bo 208s were built under licence by Bölkow Apparatebau GmbH in Laupheim, Germany. Many examples survive in private hands and are most commonly found in Germany, the United Kingdom and Scandinavia. A limited number of airworthy examples can be found in both the United States and New Zealand.

The most widely produced variant of the Bo 208 is the Bo 208C, which used a Continental O-200-A flat-four-cylinder air-cooled piston engine giving 75 kW (100 HP). A number of O-200 engines installed on Juniors were licence-built by Rolls-Royce in England.

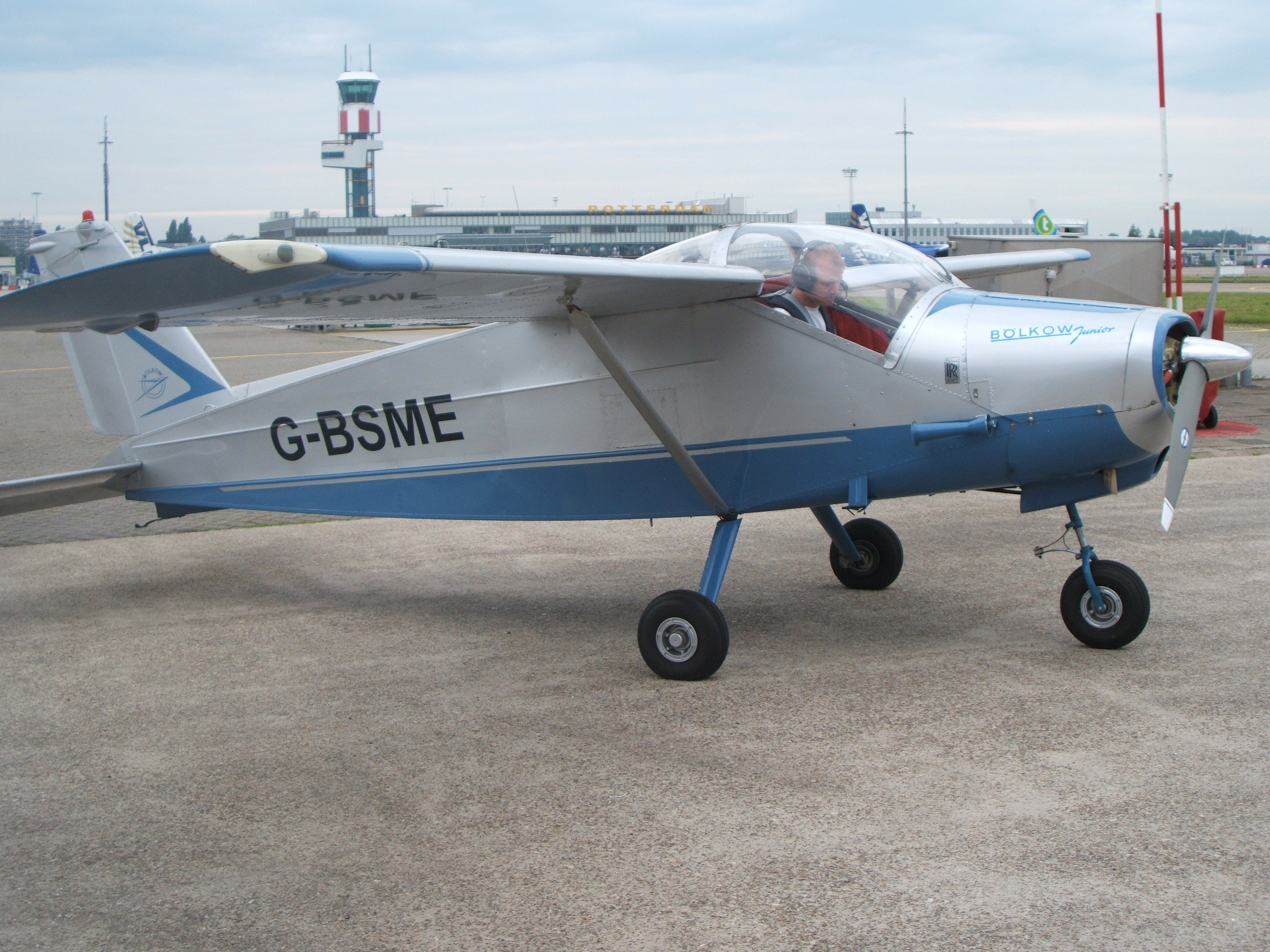
A 1966 Bölkow Bo 208C Junior, G-BSME (596), at Rotterdam Airport, The Netherlands

=== MiniCOINs ===
One variant of the MFI-9 which gained widespread fame was the MiniCOIN (an acronym for "Miniature Counter-Insurgency"), a modification of the MFI-9B military trainer variant of the MFI-9, adapted to carry weapons.

The name and concept originated with Carl Gustaf von Rosen, who realized that in a low intensity conflict even a few small, minimally armed aircraft are capable of having a significant impact. Light aircraft are in any event more suitable for operation in the primitive conditions typical in such conflicts. Von Rosen was familiar with the military trainer version of the MFI-9, which was robust enough to be able to carry significant loads of ordnance suspended from hard points on the wings.

A number of MFI-9Bs had been constructed in hopes of a sale to the Swedish Air Force, but when the sale fell through, the aircraft became available at a low price. So in May 1969, von Rosen formed a squadron of five MiniCOINs to fight in the Nigerian Civil War (1967–1970) on the side of the Biafrans in support of their effort to create an independent state.

Von Rosen had the planes painted in camouflage colours and fitted with rockets from Matra, and proceeded with a band of friends to form a squadron called Biafra Babies to strike at the airfields from which the federal Nigerian Air Force launched their attacks against the civilian population in Biafra. On 22 May 1969, and over the next few days, Von Rosen and his five aircraft launched attacks against Nigerian airfields at Port Harcourt, Enugu, Benin and other small airports. The Nigerians were taken by surprise and a number of expensive jets, including a few MiG-17 fighters and three of Nigeria's six Ilyushin Il-28 bombers, were destroyed on the ground.

The pilots included Lynn Garrison among a group of other mercenaries and Biafran-born pilots. Lynn Garrison co-ordinated the attacks, personally destroying an Ilyushin Il-28 and a MiG-17 during the first raid on Port Harcourt.

The MiniCOINs saw extensive service during most of the war, including the delivery of food aid drops. Garrison introduced a supply-dropping procedure learned in northern Canada. A bag of grain was enclosed in a larger bag before dropping; when the load hit the ground, the inner bag would rupture, while the outer bag contained the contents. Many lives were saved through air drops using this simple concept.

A total of 18 were supplied.

== Variants ==
- MFI-9 – Two-seat primary trainer aircraft. 25 built.
  - Bölkow Bo 208 – MFI-9 produced under licence by Bölkow in Germany. 200 built.
- MFI-9B Trainer – Two-seat sports, primary trainer aircraft. 43 built.
  - Biafra Baby – Five MFI-9Bs armed with six French SNEB 68 mm (2.68") unguided folding-fin rockets with armor-piercing warheads under each wing.
  - MFI-9HB - Homebuilt kit aircraft version of the MFI-9B, offered by Amsin Aviation.
- MFI-9B Mili-Trainer – Two-seat primary trainer, light-attack aircraft. Two prototypes built. Ten aircraft leased by the Swedish Air Force 1966–68 for evaluation as a primary trainer only.

== Military operators ==
Biafra

- Used by the Biafran Air Force during the Biafran War.

Sweden

- Ten MFI-9B Mili-Trainers evaluated by the Swedish Air Force.

== Specifications (MFI-9B) ==

Data from Jane's All The World's Aircraft 1965–66

General characteristics

- Crew: Two
- Length: 5.85 m (19 ft 2 in)
- Wingspan: 7.43 m (24 ft 5 in)
- Height: 2.00 m (6 ft 7 in)
- Wing area: 8.70 m^{2} (93.6 sq ft)
- Aspect ratio: 6:1
- Airfoil: NACA 23008.5 (mod.)
- Empty weight: 340 kg (750 lb)
- Max takeoff weight: 575 kg (1,268 lb)
- Fuel capacity: 80 L (21 US gal; 18 imp gal)
- Powerplant: 1 × Rolls-Royce/Continental O-200-A air-cooled flat-four engine, 75 kW (100 hp)

Performance

- Maximum speed: 236 km/h (147 mph, 127 kn) at sea level
- Cruise speed: 215 km/h (134 mph, 116 kn) (econ. cruise)
- Stall speed: 80 km/h (50 mph, 43 kn)
- Never exceed speed: 305 km/h (190 mph, 165 kn)
- Range: 800 km (500 mi, 430 nmi) (with maximum payload)
- Service ceiling: 4,500 m (14,800 ft)
- Rate of climb: 4.3 m/s (850 ft/min)

Armament
Optional:

- Rb 53 BANTAM
- Rockets
- Gun pods

== See also ==
Aircraft of comparable role, configuration, and era

- ARV Super2
- Saab Safari
