= AMF Chevvron 2-32 =

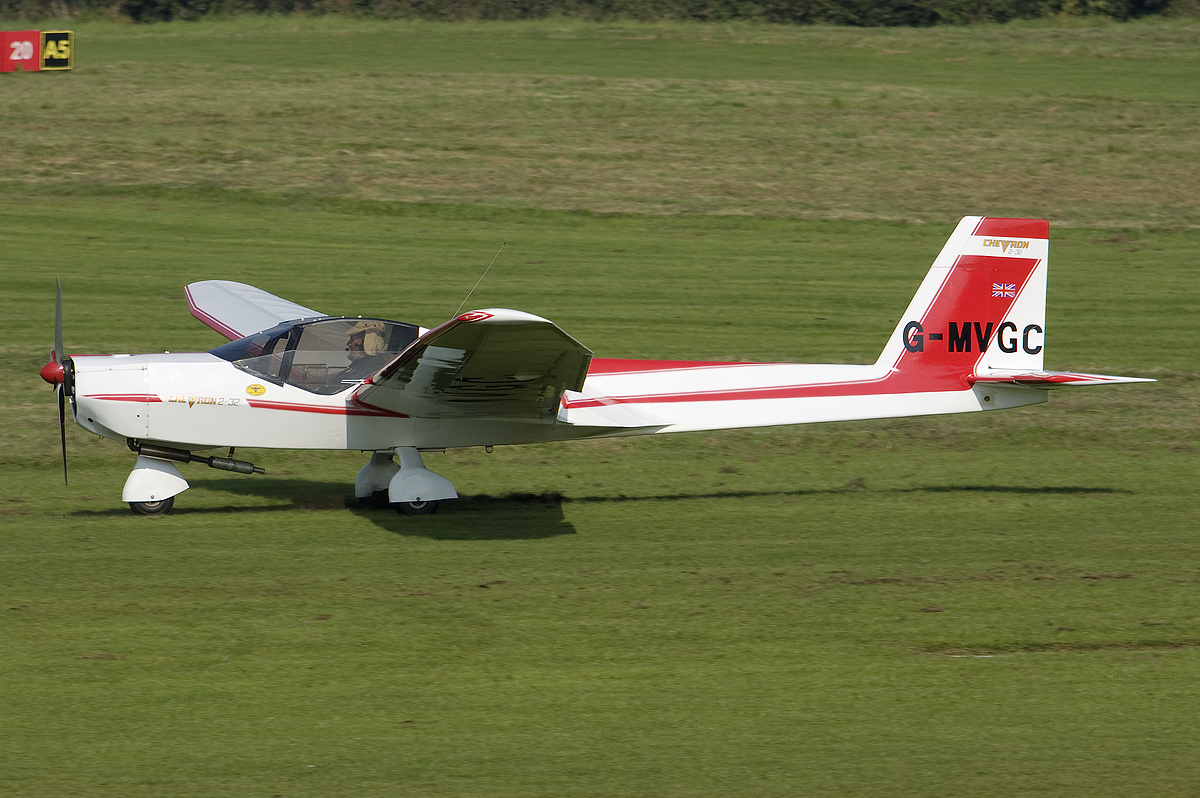

General information
- Type: Microlight trainer
- National origin: United Kingdom
- Manufacturer: AMF-Microflight
- Number built: 41

History
- Introduction date: 1987
- First flight: 1983

The AMF Chevvron is a British two-seat microlight aircraft of the 1980s and 90s. It is a single engined mid-winged monoplane with side-by-side seating. 41 were built.

== Design and development ==
The Chevvron was designed to meet a requirement for an aircraft conforming with the Civil Aviation Authority's regulations for microlight aircraft and fitted with conventional three-axis controls. The Chevvron is a mid-wing monoplane with a pod-and boom configuration and high aspect ratio wings. It is built of composite materials and is fitted with a fixed nosewheel undercarriage. The normal powerplant was a single König SD 570 two-stroke, four-cylinder air-cooled radial engine rated at 32 horsepower (24 kW) and driving a three-bladed propeller.

The first prototype, fitted with a V-tail, made its maiden flight in late 1983. A modified second prototype, with a conventional tail flew in October 1986.

== Operational history ==
AMF Microflight began production of the Chevvron in 1987, with 19 completed at their Membury factory by 1990. A single example was built of the Sea Chevvron, a floatplane version fitted with a more powerful (48 horsepower (36 kW)) König engine, while examples were also fitted with a 45 horsepower (34 kW) Limbach engine. In total, 41 Chevvrons were built. In the 1990s, a single-rotor wankel engine from the MidWest AE series was successfully fitted to a Chevvron.

== Specifications ==
Data from Jane's All The World's Aircraft 1990–91

General characteristics

- Crew: 2
- Length: 7.01 m (23 ft 0 in)
- Wingspan: 13.41 m (44 ft 0 in)
- Height: 1.52 m (5 ft 0 in)
- Wing area: 17.56 m^{2} (189.0 sq ft)
- Empty weight: 175 kg (386 lb)
- Max takeoff weight: 382 kg (842 lb)
- Powerplant: 1 × König SD 570 4-cylinder air-cooled radial engine, 24 kW (32 hp)

Performance

- Maximum speed: 120 km/h (75 mph, 65 kn)
- Cruise speed: 102 km/h (63 mph, 55 kn) (econ cruise)
- Stall speed: 56 km/h (35 mph, 30 kn)
- Range: 370 km (230 mi, 200 nmi)
- Endurance: 3 hr
- Service ceiling: 3,050 m (10,010 ft)
- g limits: +4/-2
- Rate of climb: 2.1 m/s (420 ft/min)
