= Pakistan Aeronautical Complex =

Pakistani aircraft maintenance & manufacturing company

- Trade name: PAC
- Type: SEO
- Industry: Aerospace; Defence
- Founded: 1971; 55 years ago
- Founder: Pakistan Air Force
- Headquarters: Kamra, Attock District in Punjab, Pakistan
- Area served: Worldwide
- Key people: AVM Hakim Raza (Chairman); AVM Owais Akram (Deputy Chairman)
- Products: Military aviation and electronics
- Production output: 1980–present (1980)
- Services: Aircraft maintenance Aircraft mid-life updates Aircraft design and R&D; Military avionics
- Owner: Ministry of Defence Production
- Divisions: Divisions: Aircraft Rebuild Factory Mirage Rebuild Factory Aircraft Manufacturing Factory Avionics Production Factory
- Website: www.pac.org.pk

The Pakistan Aeronautical Complex (PAC) is a major defense contractor and an aerospace manufacturer headquartered in Kamra, Punjab, Pakistan.

The Pakistan Aeronautical Complex is one of the largest defense contractors in aerospace and military aviation support.

Founded in 1971 by the Pakistan Air Force (PAF), the PAC designs, develops, and builds aircraft and avionics systems for the Pakistani military— it also provides its services for civilian aircraft. In addition, the PAC performs local maintenance and works on the aircraft MLU systems of foreign-built military and civilian aircraft. The PAC is owned entirely and sponsored by Ministry of Defence Production whose corporate appointment comes directly from the Air HQ of the Pakistan Air Force.

Many of these products are specially suited for the Pakistan Armed Forces needs, while others are also marketed to foreign export. While it collaborated with several countries’ corporate organizations, the PAC often jointly works with the Turkish TAI and the Chinese CATIC. The PAC has larger commercial and business interests in Myanmar, Nigeria, Qatar, Saudi Arabia, Azerbaijan, and the United Arab Emirates.

== History and corporate operations ==
Since 1947, the Pakistan Air Force operated largely dependent on foreign suppliers, fighter jets and aircraft had to be sent abroad for desired inspection, development, and to produce parts to maintain the fighter aircraft in service, causing the downsizing of the air force.

After consultation from the PAF's war planners at AHQ at the Rawalpindi Cantonment, the Pakistan Aeronautical Complex (PAC) was established in 1973 in Kamra with Aircraft Rebuild Factory first being functional. PAC was established by the Pakistan Air Force (PAF) as part of the new defence policy introduced in 1972; the PAC represents wide range of corporate revenue of the air force while fulfilling the national security needs of the country. The Pakistan Aeronautical Complex is organized with four defense factories previously designated P-721, P-741, P-751, and KARF. The first two digits show the year of project approval and launch, the third digit is a serial designator.

Each of the four factories are run under the managing director (MD) who is usually appointed directly from the Air Force as an external billets appointments. Since 1980s–90s, PAC functions include licensed-built French Mirage III, Mirage V, and overhauling and building of the F100 engines for the F-16A/Bs under license from American Pratt & Whitney.

=== Aircraft Rebuild Factory (ARF) ===
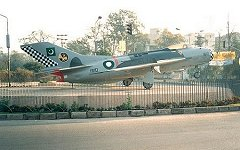
A retired Pakistan Air Force F-6 on display on an intersection in 2002.

The Aircraft Rebuild Factory (ARF), founded as officially as P-721 and formerly known as F-6 Rebuild Factory (F-6RF), is primarily dedicated to reverse engineering, overhauling, and machining the parts of the Chinese-origin aircraft in service with the Pakistan Air Force (PAF).

The plant was established in 1971 and commenced operations in 1972; for the P-721, the first two digits show the year of project approval and launch, the third digit is a serial designator.

Originally, the plant overhauled and machined parts for the Chinese Shenyang J6 (local designation as F-6) but the program expanded towards manufacturing and overhauling the other Chinese fighters and manufacturing the engines including:

- Nanchang Q-5 (local designation: A-5 Fantan)
- Shenyang J-5 (local designation as F-5 Fresco)
- Shenyang J-6 (local designation as F-6 Farmer)
- Chengdu J-7 (local designation as F-7 Fishcan)
- Bell AH-1 Cobra (local designation: AH-1 Cobra)

Over the years, the ARF became capable of manufacturing the drop tanks and jet engine harnesses of various Chinese-built aircraft as well as printed circuit boards for the American AH-1 Cobra attack helicopters. The plant is certified and qualified to award the ISO/IEC 17025 and the ISO 9000 under approved by the Pakistan National Accreditation Council and the International Laboratory Accreditation Cooperation.

The ARF maintained Aircraft depictions of Pakistan Aeronautical Complex
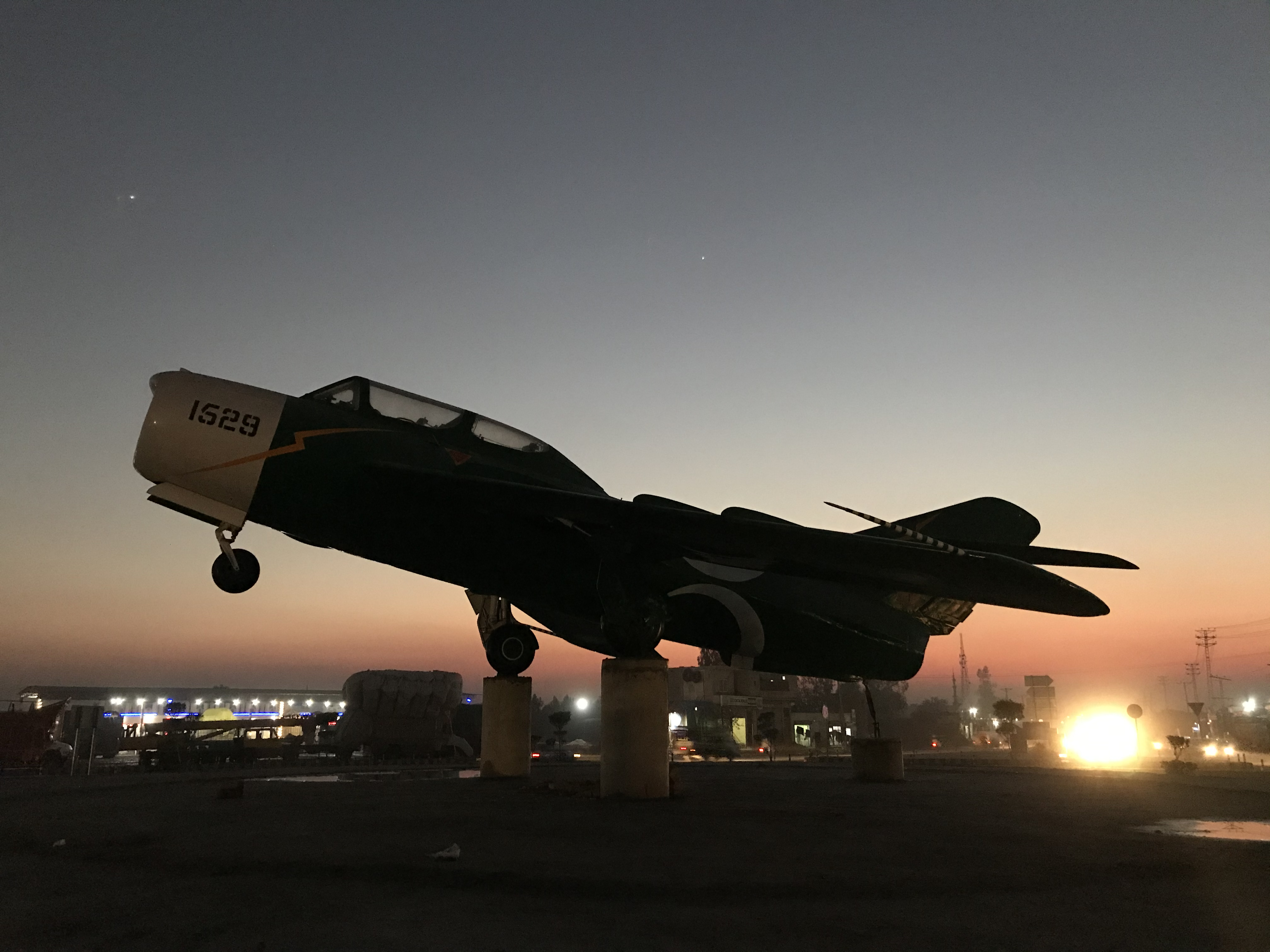
The PAF's F-5 in display.

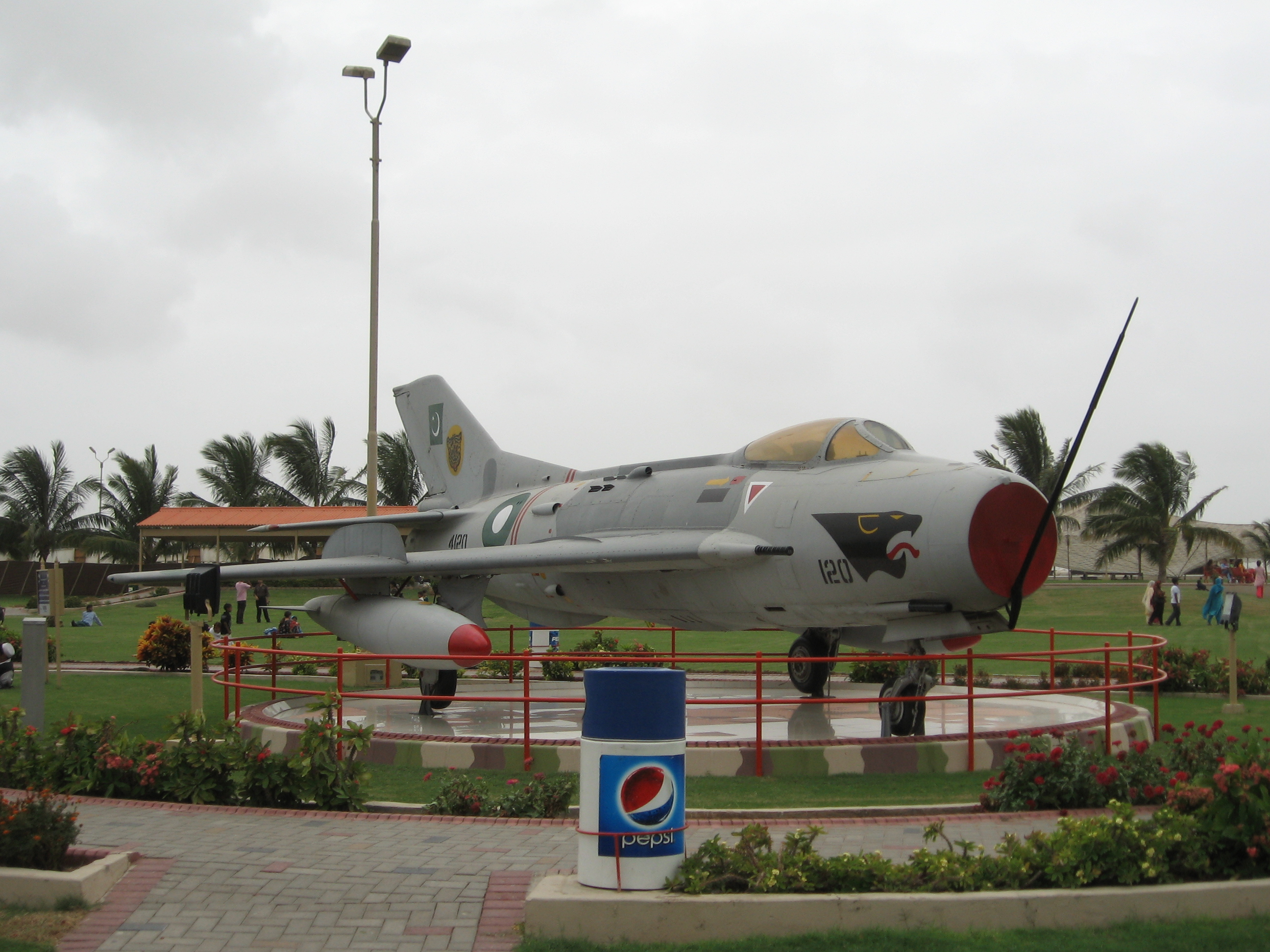
The PAF's F-6 displayed in Pakistan Air Force Museum.

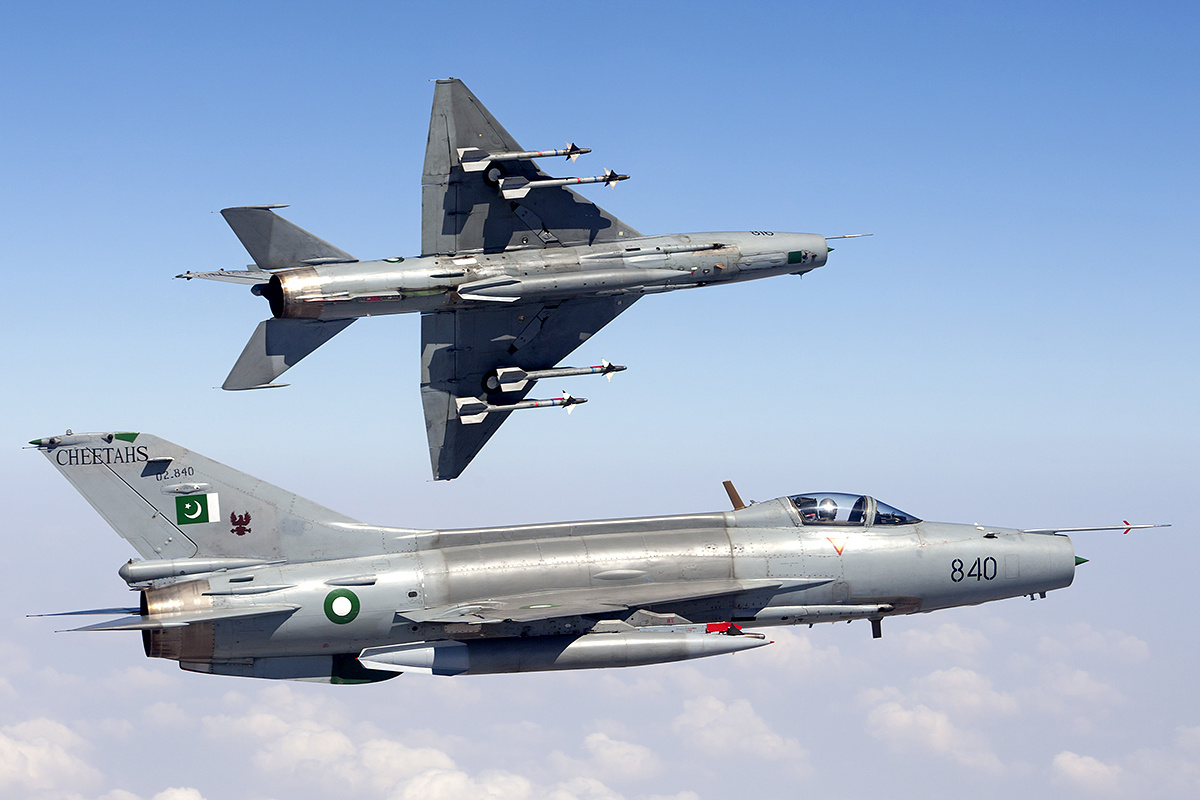
The PAF's F-7 in flight formation.

=== Mirage Rebuild Factory ===
The Mirage Rebuild Factory (MRF), founded official as P-741, is a dedicated plant for overhauling and reverse engineering of the French-made Dassault Aviation's fighter jets in service with the Pakistan Air Force. Establishment of the Mirage Rebuild Factory was a result of long and complicated negotiation took place between the Pakistan and French administrations.

The MRF was a long-sought effort by the Bhutto administration which was engaged in complicated and lengthy trade negotiations with the French government to allow license-built production of the Mirage III and Mirage V aircraft. The plant was established in 1974 and commenced operations in 1975; for the P-741, the first two digits show the year of project approval and launch, the third digit is a serial designator. Based on the French guidance and design replication, the first Mirage III aircraft was successfully built, produced, and overhauled in 1980.

Although, no longer produced and developed by the French Dassault Aviation, the MRF still produces, builds, and manufactures airframes for the Mirage jets including machining of the key components. Due to lack of budget for replacing outdated aircraft, the MRF was devoted to domestically overhauling them, which according to claims, saved the country billions of Pakistani taxpayers's financial capital in US currency.

In 1980, the French government agreed on proposal with Zia administration on approving the sale of designs of designs of the Atar 09c engines as well as establishing the MRO facility that expanded the work scope of the factory.

Later, the successful negotiations between the United States and Pakistan allowed the MRF to overhaul and machined key parts of the American Pratt & Whitney F100 turbofan engines for the General Dynamics F-16 Fighting Falcon. The MRF, under permission and licensed under the United States laws, replicate designs and machines key parts as a broad maintenance and repair efforts for keeping the F-16A/B Fighting Falcon and F-16C/D Viper in service with the nation's air force.

The MRF maintained aircraft depictions of Pakistan Aeronautical Complex
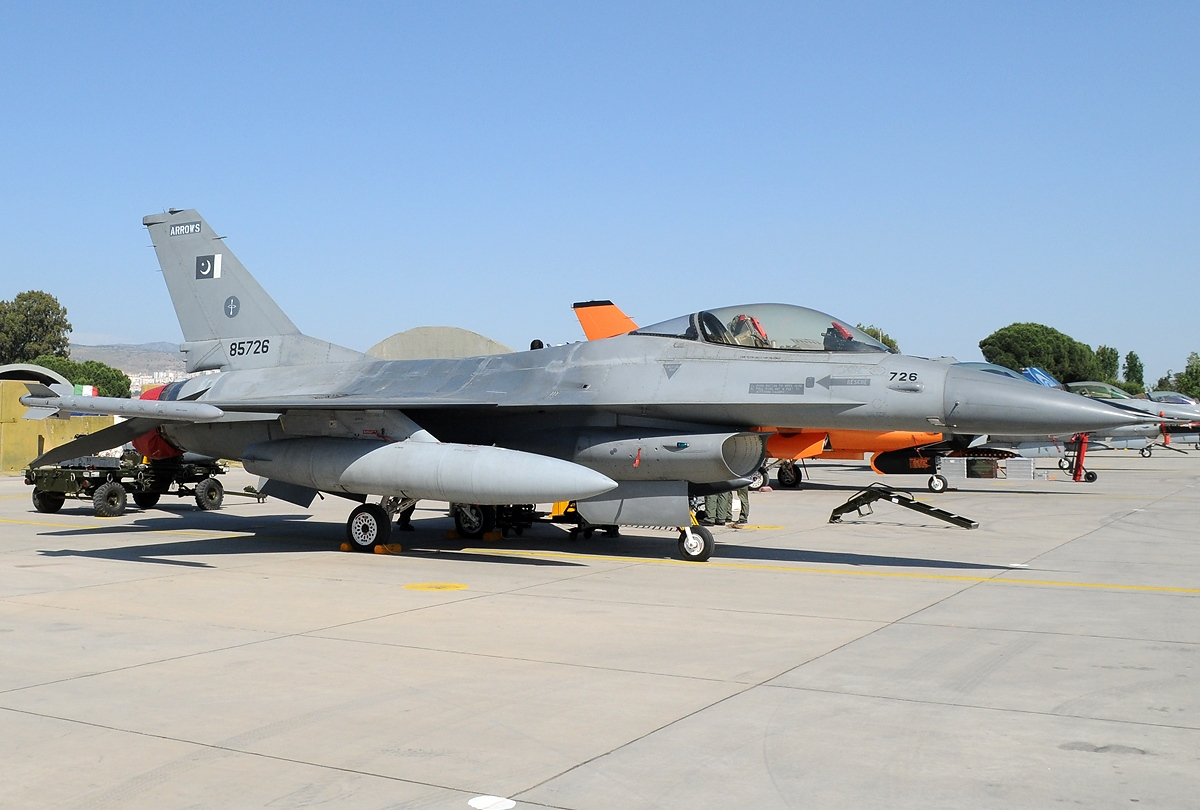
The PAF's F-16A/B are maintained and overhauled at the PAC's MRF facility.

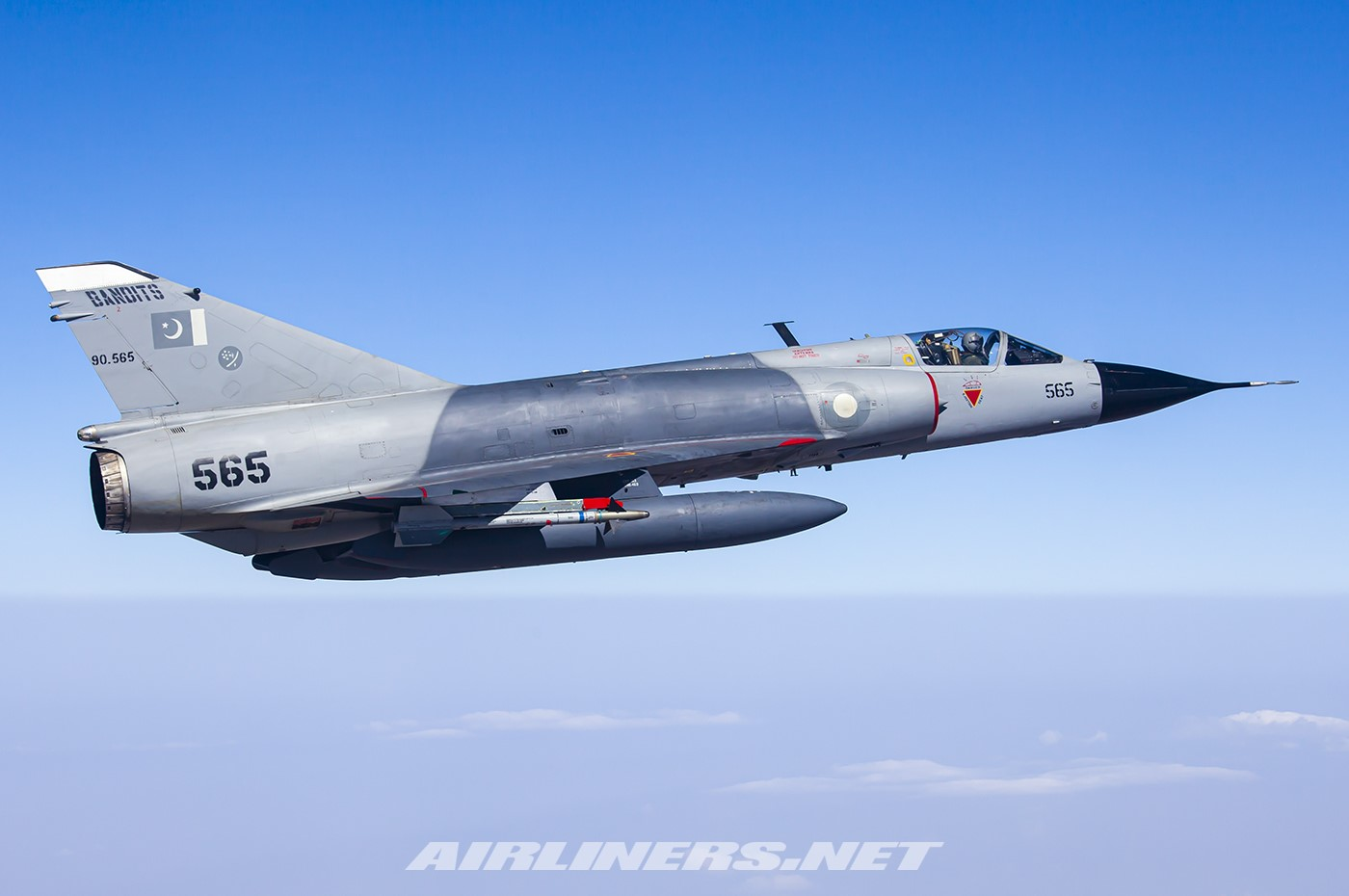
The Mirage-III are built and produced under-licensed by the French government for the PAF at the MRF facility.

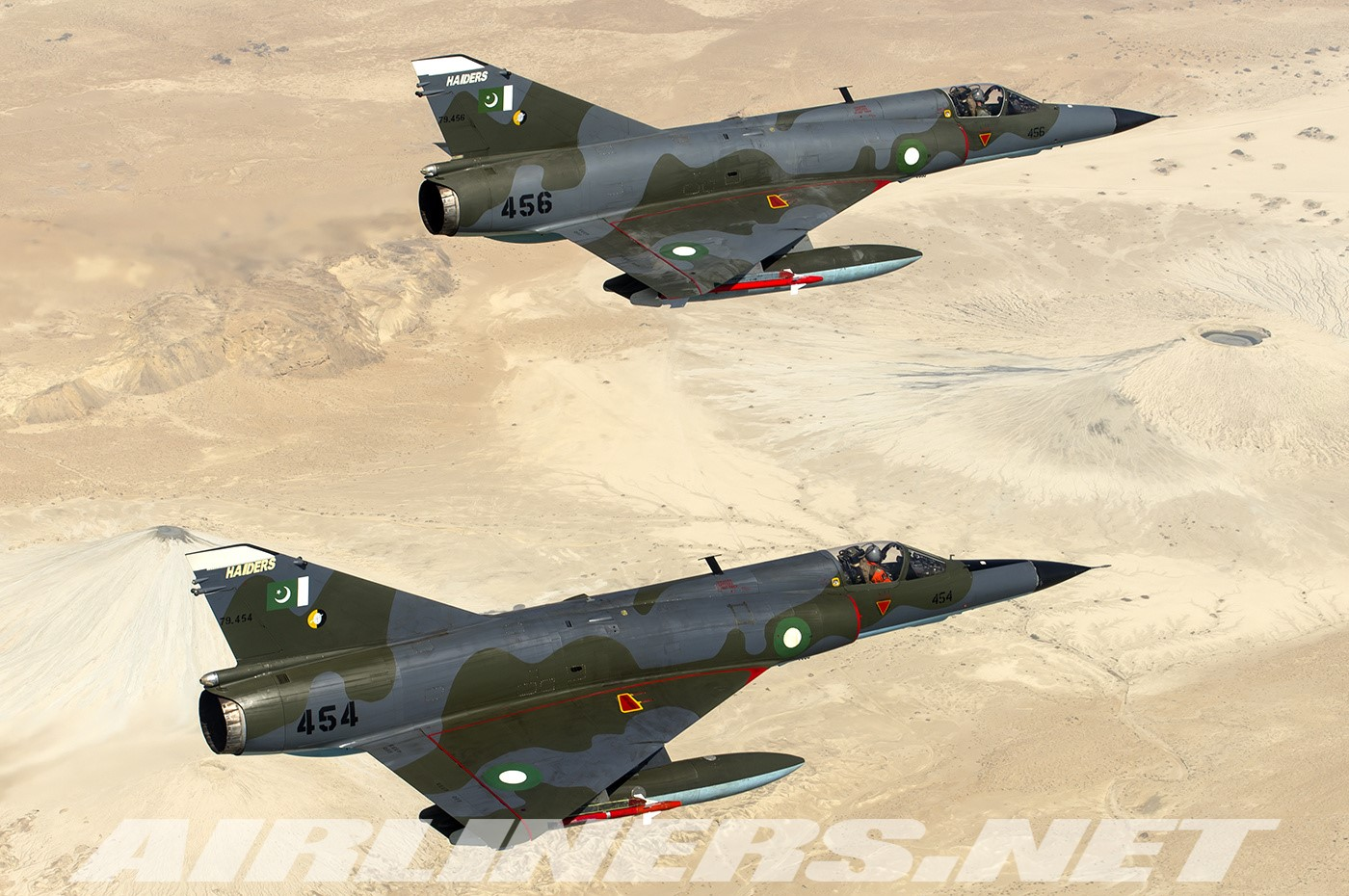
The Mirage-V are built and produced under-licensed by the French government for the PAF at the MRF facility.

The plant is certified and qualified to award the ISO/IEC 17025 and the ISO 9000 under approved by the Pakistan National Accreditation Council and the International Laboratory Accreditation Cooperation.

=== Aircraft Manufacturing Factory ===
The Aircraft Manufacturing Factory (AMF), officially founded as P-751, is a dedicated plant for designing and developing the fighter jets and the aircraft for the Pakistani military.

The plant was established in 1975 with the project of designing and building the basic trainer aircraft in cooperation with Sweden. The project resulted in developing of the small MFI-17 Mushshak which was designed and influenced from the Saab Safari, a basic trainer aircraft marketed by the Sweden, in 1981. In 1985, the PAC collaborated with Chinese Hongdu Aviation Industry Group to design and development of the K-8 Karakorum, with AMF leading a role of machining and manufacturing the parts for the aircraft. In 1987, the development of the advanced fighter jet based on the F-16 was conceived as Project Sabre II, that saw collaboration with the United States and the China.

In 1990s, the Project Sabre II was evolved with Russian contractors joining the design bureau which resulted in development and production of the JF-17 (also known as FC-1); though the project was mostly finished and completed jointly by China and Pakistan at the AMF facility. The MFI-17, MFI-395, K-8 and JF-17 are now in service with the nation's air force. The AMF also designs and manufactures unmanned aerial vehicles for uses such as target practice.

Manufacture of sub-assemblies for the JF-17 light-weight multi-role fighter began on 22 January 2008, while serial production of the fighter began on 30 June 2009. On 20 August 2009, the PAF announced that it would begin production of its own unmanned aerial vehicles in collaboration with Italian company Selex Galileo. In 2024, the opportunity to design, build, and manufacture its own aircraft, Project Azm was lost when the Ministry of Defence prioritised acquiring the Chengdu J-10 (local designation: FC-20).

Aircraft depictions of AMF of the Pakistan Aeronautical Complex
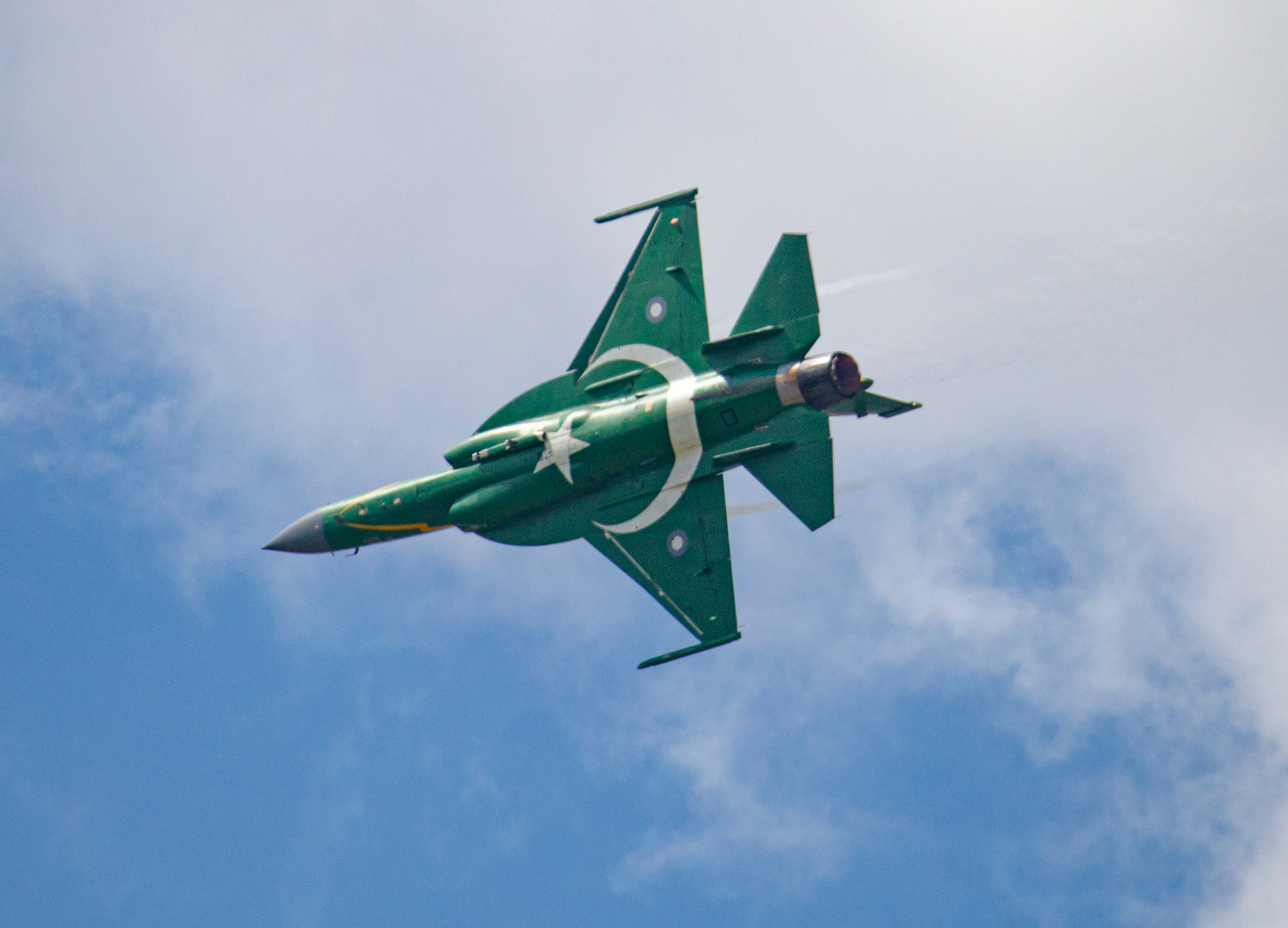
The PAF's JF-17 are designed and manufactured at the AMF facility.

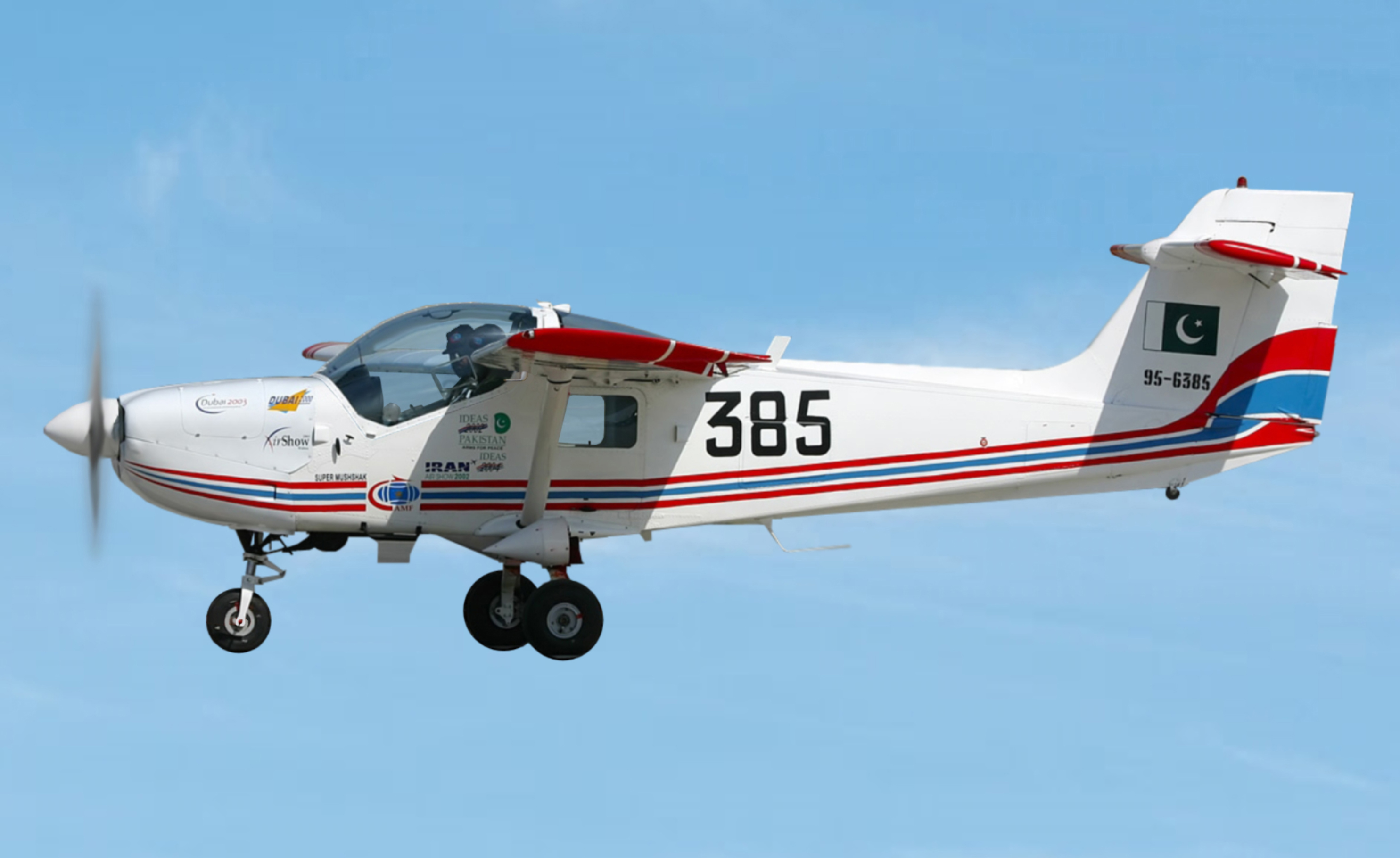
The trainer aircraft PAC MFI-17 Mushshak produced at the AMF.

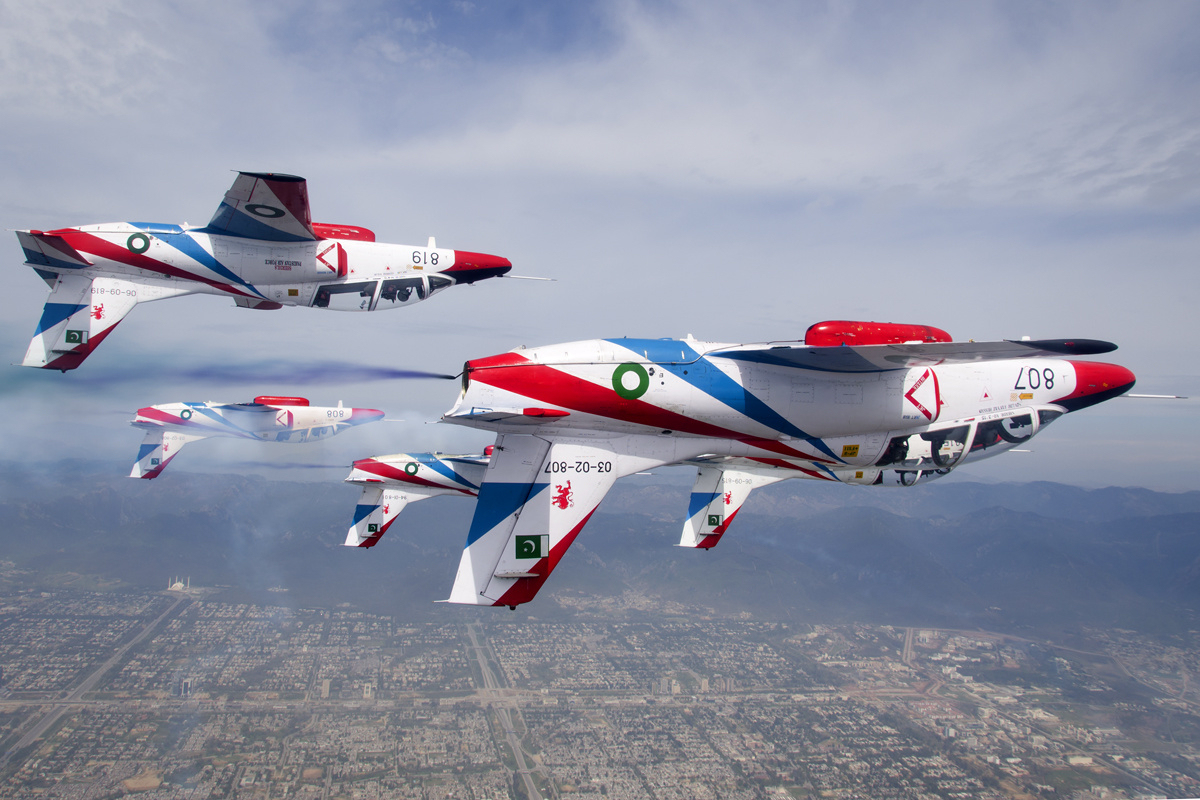
The Hongdu/PAC JL-8 aircraft in formation.

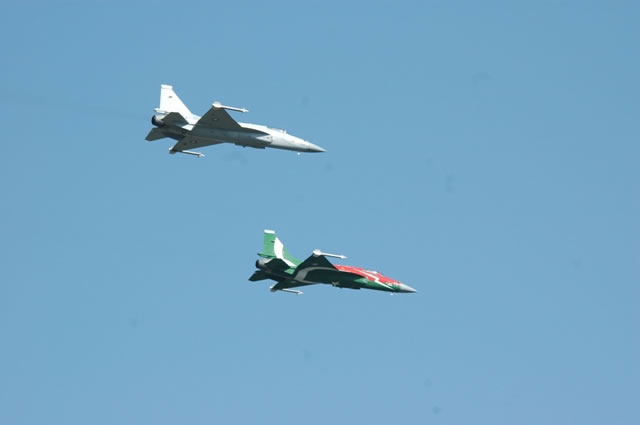
The Two JF-17 multi-role fighters during a flypast performance in Islamabad on 23 March 2007, assembled by PAC earlier that month. Serial production of the fighter at AMF began on 30 June 2009.

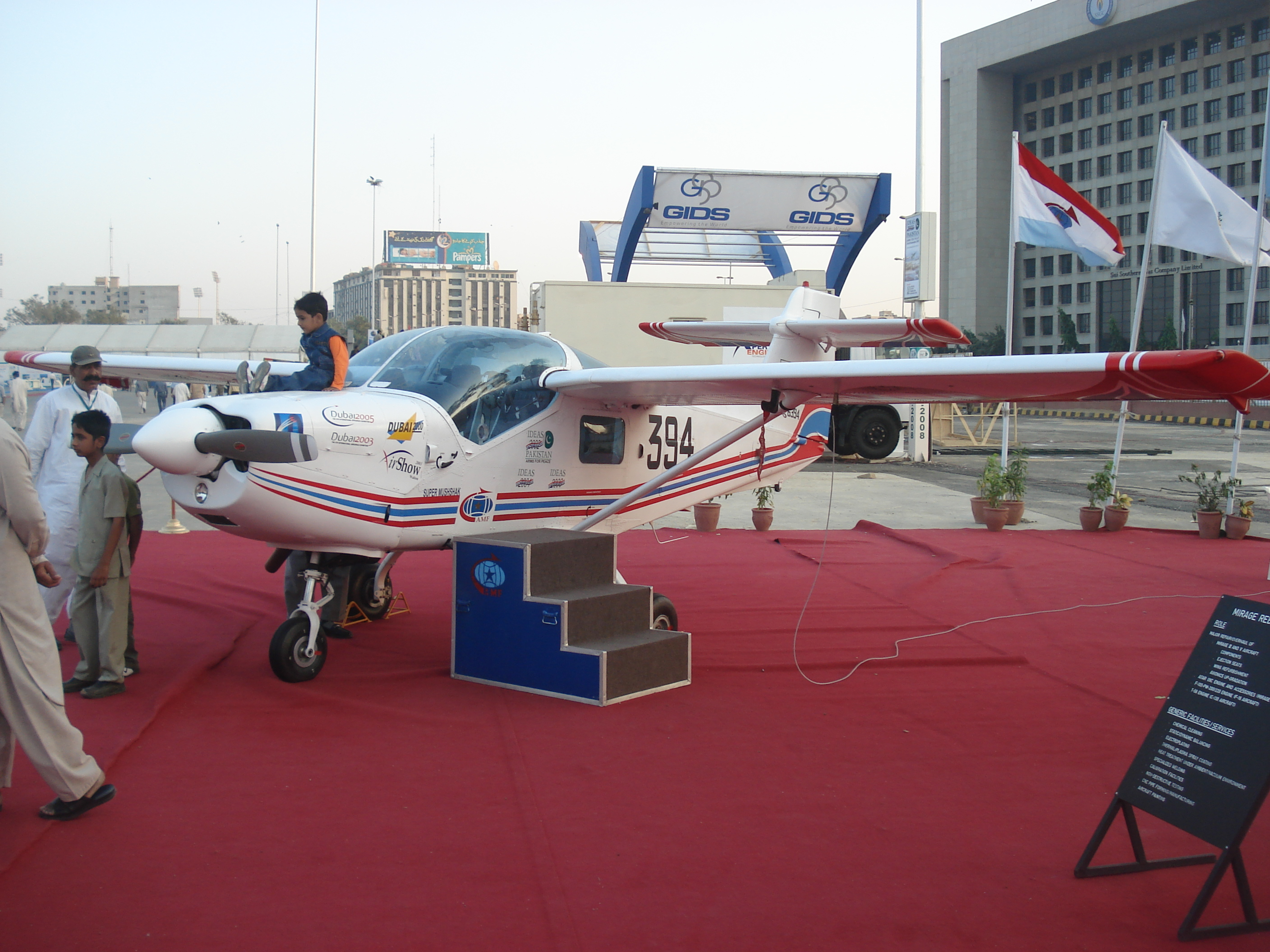
An MFI-395 Super Mushshak, produced at AMF, on display at the IDEAS 2008 defence exhibition in Karachi, Pakistan.

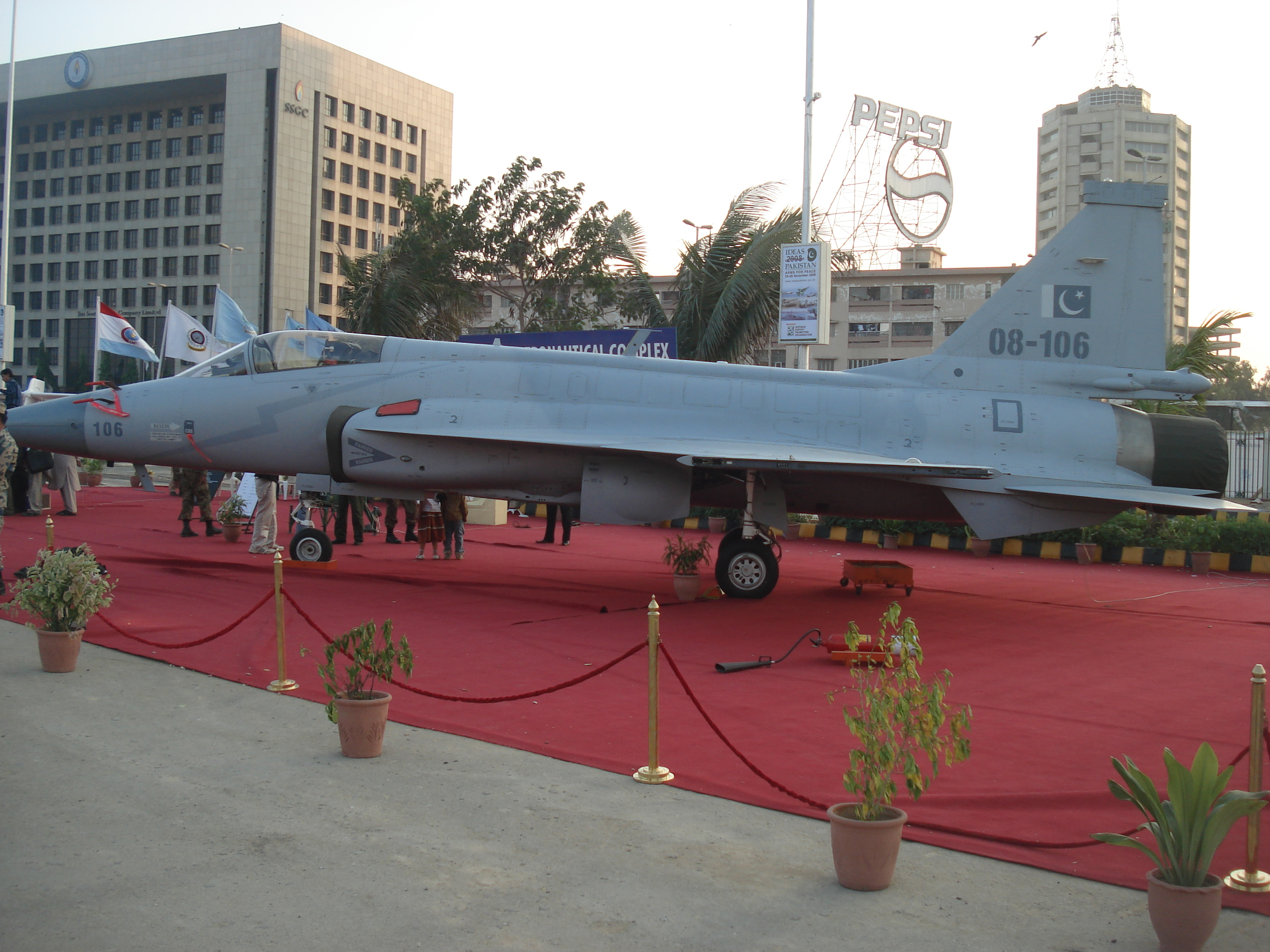
The new JF-17 multi-role fighter, displayed at the IDEAS 2008 Defense Exhibition in Karachi, Pakistan and currently under production by PAC.

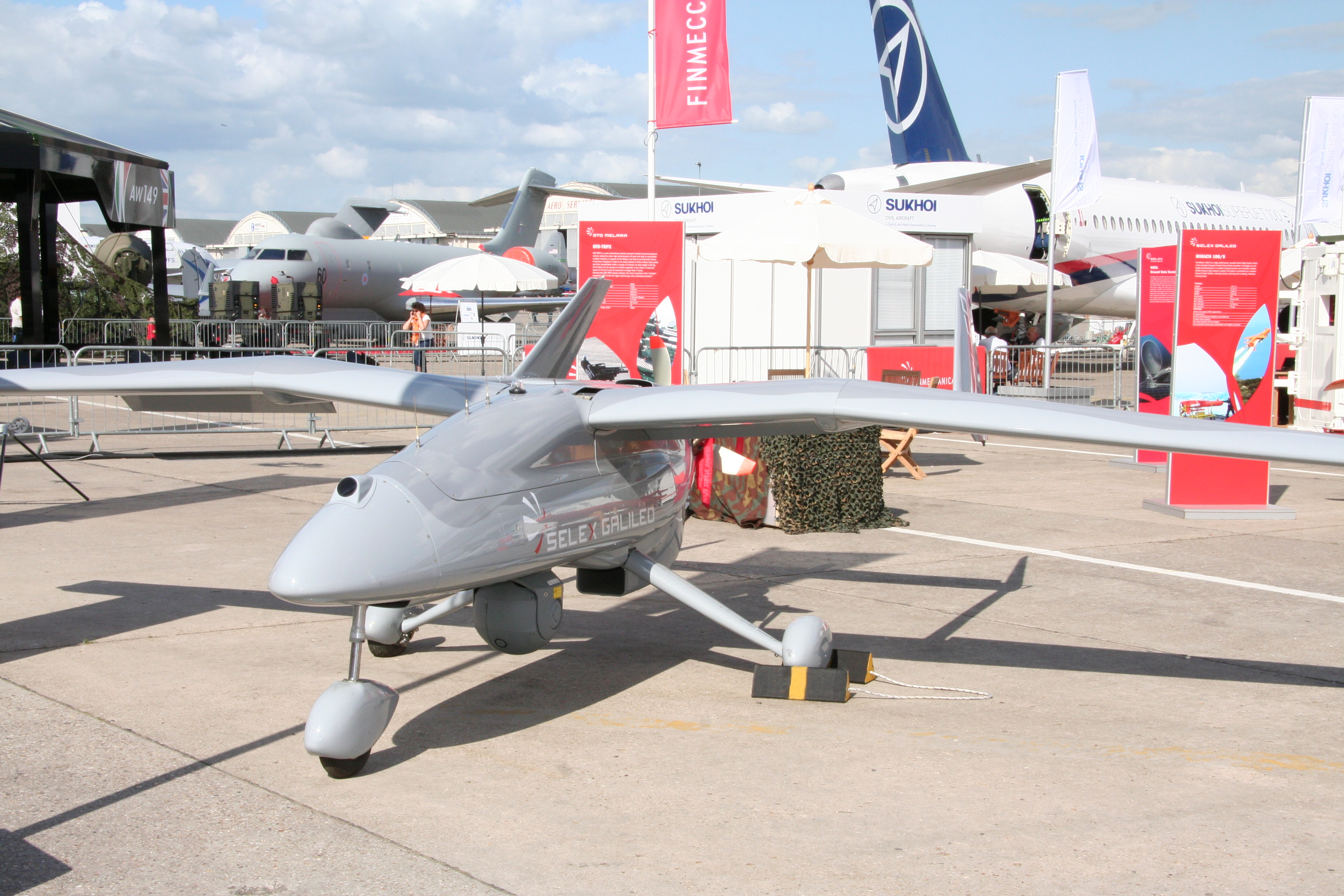
The Italian-designed and produced drone UAV Falco are licensed production at the PAC

=== Avionics Production Factory ===
The Avionics Production Factory (APF), formerly known as Kamra Avionics and Radar Factory (KARF) was founded by the Pakistan Air Force to overhaul and maintain its ground-based airborne radar systems, military electronics, and provide support to the avionics in 1983.

Cooperation from Pakistan's European defense partners was crucial in expanding the work scope of the APF between 1983–96. The European defense partners of Pakistan helped the APF to build under license many radars, electronics equipment, and subsequently the electromagnetic compatibility infrastructure to address the defense need of the country. The APF received its certification and quality grade assurance from the ISO 9002

In 2009, the United States Department of Defense (USDOD) provided the certification training to the APF through its defense contractor, APS Novstar, to be able to print circuit boards and machining of the electrical components for combat aircraft as part of the counterterrorism program.

The APF depictions of Pakistan Aeronautical Complex
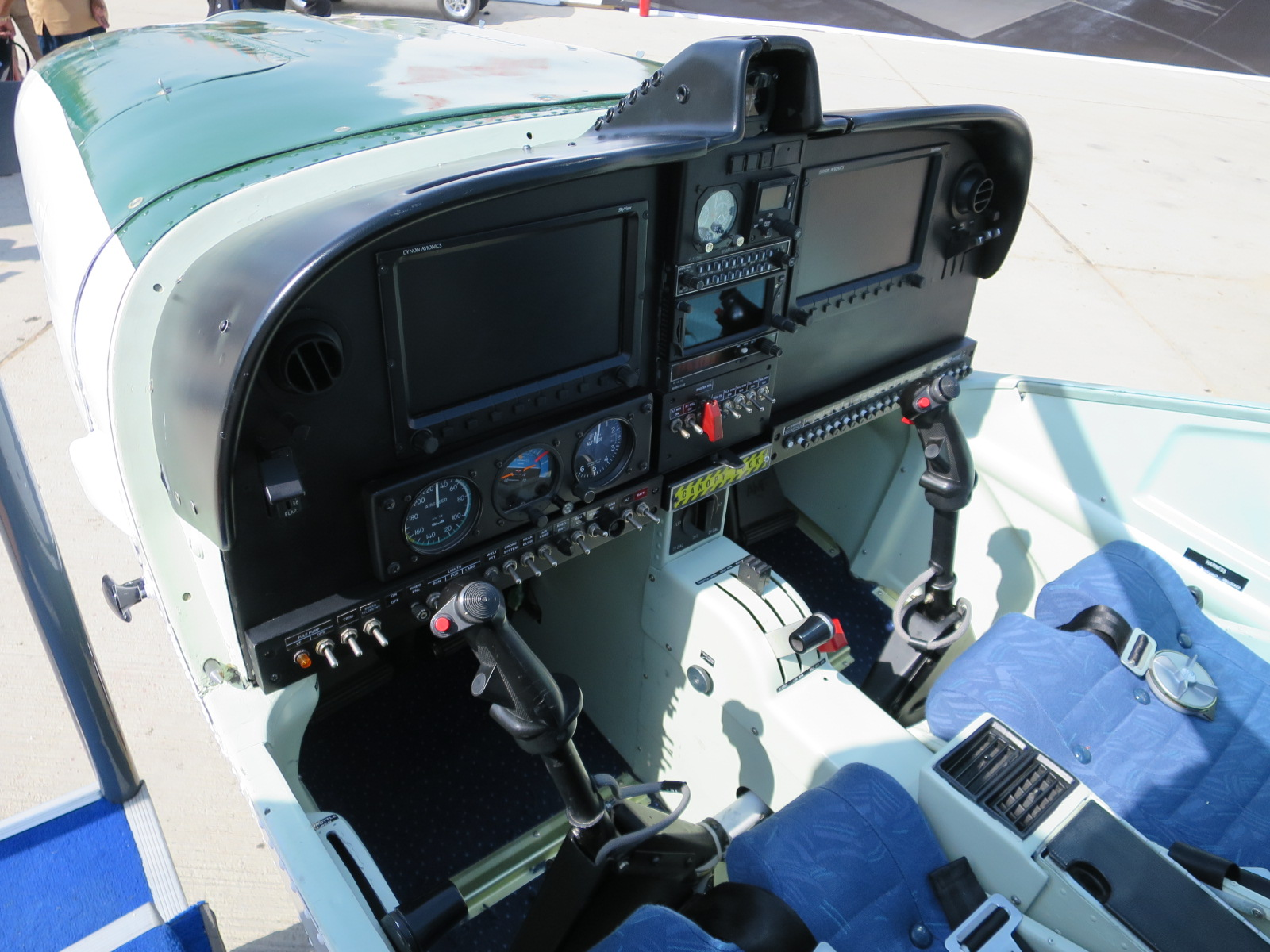
The cockpit and offline avionics display of the PAC Super Mushshak.

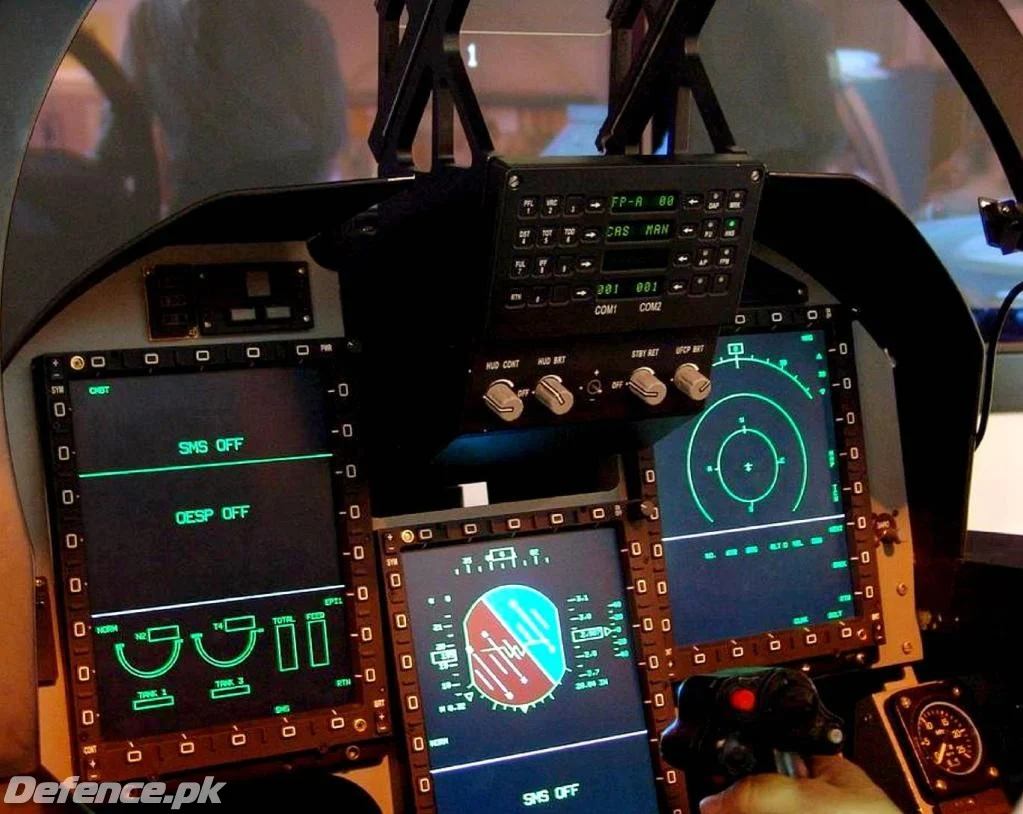
The traditional avionics display of the JF-17A.

== Products ==
=== Fighter aircraft ===
- JF-17 Thunder — Multirole jet fighter — Co-production with Chengdu Aerospace Corporation of China.

=== Trainer aircraft ===
- Karakorum-8 — Intermediate jet trainer & light attack aircraft — Co-production with Hongdu Aviation Industry Group of China.
- MFI-17 Mushshak — Turboprop aircraft for basic training — Upgraded variant of MFI-15 Safari.
  - Super Mushshak — Two/three-seat, piston engine, turboprop aircraft for basic training, liaison & light ground attack — Upgraded variant of MFI-17 Mushshak.

=== Unmanned Aerial Vehicles (UAVs) ===
- Falco — Surveillance UAV — Production began in August 2009 under license of Selex ES of Italy.

=== Consumer Electronics ===
- PAC-PAD 1
- PAC-PAD Takhti 7
- The PAC e-book 1
- The PAC n-book 1

== Certification and quality assurance ==
The Pakistan Aeronautical Complex's four plants are certified and qualified to award quality grade assurance under the ISO/IEC 17025 and the ISO 9000 under approved by the Pakistan National Accreditation Council and the International Laboratory Accreditation Cooperation.

== See also ==
- PAF Base Minhas
- Kamra, Pakistan
