= König SD 570 =

Four-cylinder, two-stroke, single ignition radial aircraft engine

- Type: Two-stroke aircraft engine
- National origin: Germany
- Manufacturer: Dieter König; Compact Radial Engines

The König SD 570 is a four-cylinder, two-stroke, single ignition radial aircraft engine designed for powered paragliders, powered parachutes and single place ultralight trikes.

The engine was originally designed and produced by Dieter König of Berlin, Germany. The design was sold to Zanzottera Technologies of Italy and then sold again, along with the rest of Zanzottera's two-stroke ultralight aircraft engine line to Compact Radial Engines of Surrey, British Columbia, Canada. Compact Radial Engines was then in turn acquired by Fiate Aviation Co., Ltd. of Hefei, Anhui, China in August 2017. Fiate Aviation did not advertise the engine as available in 2021.

== Development ==
The SD 570 is an unusual four-cylinder radial engine that is very compact and light weight at only 19 kg (42 lb). The engine features single capacitor discharge ignition, a single Bing 49 diaphragm-type carburetor and rotary valve induction. Compact Radial Engines offered it without a reduction drive, although when Zanzottera built it an optional 1.75:1 cog belt reduction drive was available. Starting is electric starter only and a recoil starter is not an option.

Earlier versions produced 28 hp (21 kW) at 4200 rpm with a slide-type carburetor and reduction drive. The Compact Radial Engines version is rated at 24 hp (18 kW) at 4200 rpm. Time between overhaul is rated as 300 hours.

The SD 570 shares the same bore and stroke as the smaller three-cylinder König SC 430 radial engine.

== Variants ==
Zanzottera SD 570
Four-cylinder, two-stroke, single-ignition, radial aircraft engine producing 28 hp (21 kW) at 4200 rpm. Equipped with a slide-type carburetor and an optional reduction drive.
Compact Radial Engines SD 570
Four-cylinder, two-stroke, single-ignition, radial aircraft engine producing 24 hp (18 kW) at 4200 rpm. Equipped with a Bing 49 diaphragm-type carburetor and no reduction drive.

== Applications ==
- AMF Chevvron 2-32
- MFI BA-12 Sländan
- Ligeti Stratos

== Specifications (CD 570) ==
Data from Compact Radial Engines

=== General characteristics ===
- Type: Four-cylinder, radial two-stroke aircraft engine
- Bore: 66 mm (2.60 in)
- Stroke: 42 mm (1.65 in)
- Displacement: 579 cc (35.33 cu in)
- Dry weight: 19 kg (42 lb)

=== Components ===
- Valvetrain: rotary valve induction
- Oil system: premixed oil and fuel
- Cooling system: air-cooled
- Reduction gear: none

=== Performance ===
- Power output: 24 hp (18 kW) at 4200 rpm

== See also ==
- Hirth F-33
- Rotax 277
