= Malmö MFI-10 Vipan =

Type of aircraft

MFI-10 Vipan
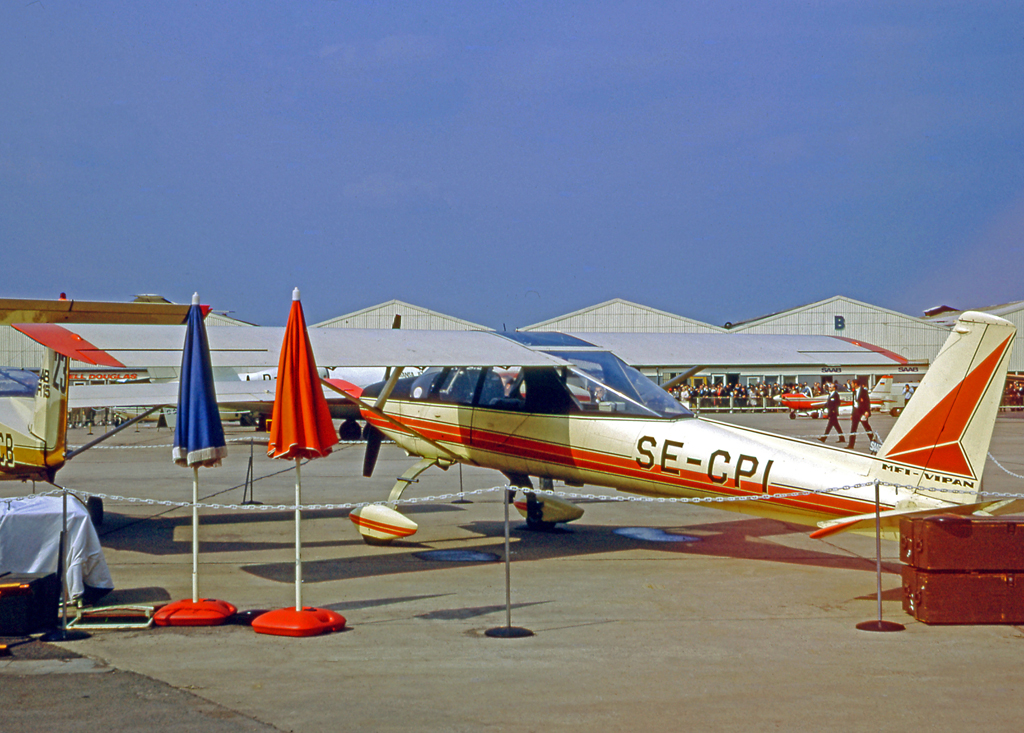
- The third MFI-10B Vipan exhibited at the 1970 Hanover Air Show

General information
- Type: Four-seat utility aircraft
- National origin: Sweden
- Manufacturer: Malmö Flygindustri
- Primary user: Swedish Army
- Number built: 3

History
- First flight: 1961

The Malmö MFI-10 Vipan (en: Peewit) was a four-seat light utility monoplane designed and built in Sweden by Malmö Flygindustri. Only three aircraft were built and the type did not enter quantity production.

== Design and development ==
Designed to meet a requirement for both a civil and military utility aircraft the MFI-10 was a braced high-wing monoplane with a fixed tailwheel landing gear and a cabin for a pilot and three passengers. The aircraft made extensive use of aluminum honeycomb structure, with the wings, tail and rear fuselage made of honeycomb and the forward fuselage of welded steel tubes. The prototype was powered by a nose-mounted 160 hp (119 kW) Lycoming O-320 engine and first flew in 1961. It was followed by two military prototypes for the Swedish Army designated MFI-10B. The MFI-10B had a 180 hp (134 kW) Lycoming O-360-A1A engine and first flew on 27 June 1962. Plans to produce a variant with a more powerful engine did not proceed and the aircraft did not enter quantity production.

The German company Rhein-Flugzeugbau (RFB) proposed new versions of the MFI-10 in 1993, with either tailwheel or tricycle landing gears.

== Variants ==
MFI-10 Vipan
Civil prototype with a 160hp (119kW) Lycoming O-320 engine, one built.
MFI-10B Vipan
Military prototype with a 180hp (134kW) Lycoming O-360-A1A engine, two built, designated MFI Fpl54.
MFI-10C Vipan
Proposed by RFB - military version with tailwheel undercarriage and powered by 200 hp (150 kW) O-360-A engine.
MFI-10D Phönix
Proposed by RFB - civil version with nosewheel undercarriage.

== Operators ==
Sweden

- Swedish Army

== Specifications (MFI-10B) ==
Data from Jane's All The World's Aircraft 1969-70

General characteristics

- Crew: 1
- Capacity: 3 passengers
- Length: 7.90 m (25 ft 11 in)
- Wingspan: 10.73 m (35 ft 2 in)
- Height: 2.20 m (7 ft 3 in)
- Wing area: 15.70 m^{2} (169.0 sq ft)
- Aspect ratio: 7.35:1
- Airfoil: NACA 25012
- Empty weight: 650 kg (1,433 lb)
- Max takeoff weight: 1,175 kg (2,590 lb)
- Fuel capacity: 200 L (44 imp gal; 53 US gal)
- Powerplant: 1 × Lycoming O-360-A1A air-cooled flat-four engine, 130 kW (180 hp)
- Propellers: 2-bladed Hartzell constant-speed propeller

Performance

- Maximum speed: 236 km/h (147 mph, 127 kn)
- Cruise speed: 220 km/h (140 mph, 120 kn) at 2,100 m (6,900 ft)
- Never exceed speed: 310 km/h (190 mph, 170 kn)
- Range: 1,000 km (620 mi, 540 nmi)
- Service ceiling: 4,260 m (13,980 ft)
- Rate of climb: 3.4 m/s (670 ft/min)
- Takeoff run: 180 m (590 ft)
