= FFV Aerotech BA-14 Starling =

BA-14 Starling

General information
- Type: Two-seat light monoplane
- National origin: Sweden
- Designer: Björn Andreasson

History
- First flight: 25 August 1988
- Developed from: MFI BA-12 Sländan

The FFV Aerotech BA-14 Starling is a Swedish two-seat light monoplane designed by Björn Andreasson and developed as a joint venture between Malmo Forsknings & Innovations and FFV Aerotech.

== Design and development ==
The prototype Starling first flew on 25 August 1988, it is a shoulder-wing monoplane mainly built from composite materials. The semi-monocoque fuselage has a V-tail which has a small ventral fin with a tailskid, the main landing gear is a fixed tricycle type. The prototype was powered by a 115 hp (86 kW) Lycoming O-235 flat-four piston engine with a two-bladed fixed-pitch tractor propeller. The enclosed cabin has side-by-side configuration seating for two under a one-piece transparent canopy.

A BA-14 appeared at the 1988 SBAC Farnborough Airshow.

== Specifications (Utility variant) ==
Data from Jane's All the World's Aircraft 1989-90

General characteristics

- Crew: 2
- Length: 6.56 m (21 ft 6.25 in)
- Wingspan: 11.38 m (37 ft 4 in)
- Height: 2.70 m (8 ft 10.25 in)
- Empty weight: 480 kg (1,059 lb)
- Gross weight: 710 kg (1,565 lb)
- Powerplant: 1 × Lycoming O-235 flat-four piston engine , 86 kW (115 hp)

Performance

- Maximum speed: 240 km/h (150 mph, 130 kn)
- Rate of climb: 3.6 m/s (700 ft/min)
