= Pakistan National Accreditation Council =

- پاکستان قومی اسناد کونسل

Agency overview
- Formed: 1998
- Headquarters: Islamabad, Pakistan
- Website: pnac.gov.pk

The Pakistan National Accreditation Council (PNAC; Urdu: پاکستان قومی اسناد کونسل) is a department subordinate to the Ministry of Science and Technology of the Government of Pakistan.

== Formation and Objective ==
The Pakistan National Accreditation Council was formed in the year 1998, after Pakistan joined the World Trade Organization (WTO). The main objective of the council is to regulate and accredit laboratories and certification bodies.

== Mutual Recognition Agreements ==
The council has mutual recognition agreements with the International Laboratory Accreditation Cooperation (ILAC) and the Asia Pacific Laboratory Accreditation Cooperation (APLAC).
