= Kamra, Pakistan =

Kamra Kalan کامرہ
- Town
- Kamra
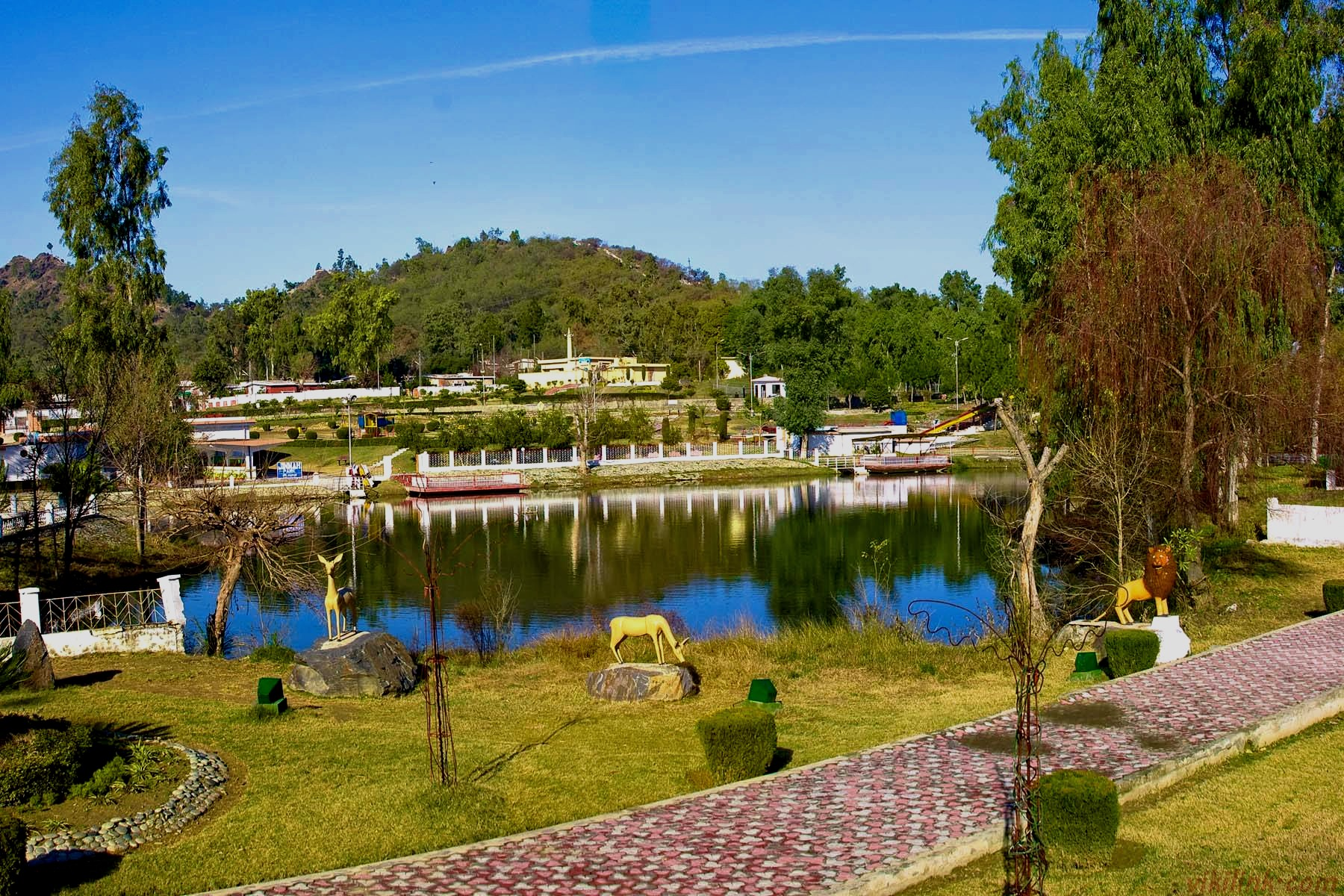
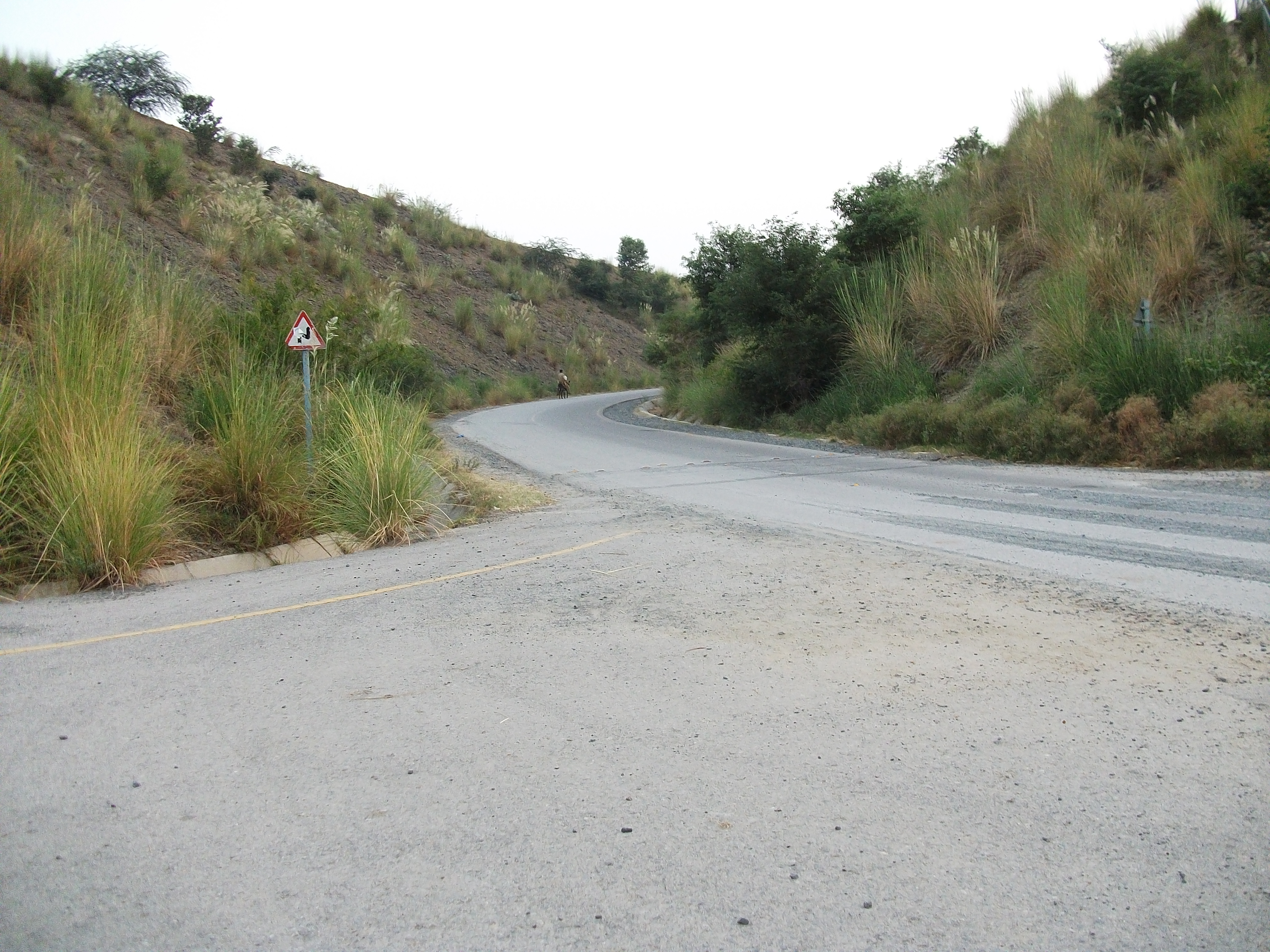
- Top: A lake located in Kamra Below: A road located in Kamra
- Nickname: City of Aviation
- Location within Punjab, Pakistan Location within Pakistan
- Coordinates: 33°51′N 72°24′E
- Country: Pakistan
- Province: Punjab
- District: Attock
- Tehsil: Attock
- Elevation: 312 m (1,024 ft)
- Time zone: UTC+5 (PST)
- Postal code: 43570
- Website: http://www.cbkamra.gov.pk/en

Kamra (Urdu: کامرہ) is a town located in Attock District in the mountainous north of Punjab, Pakistan. The area is host to defence institutions such as the Pakistan Aeronautical Complex and PAF Base Minhas of the Pakistan Air Force.

== Schools ==
- Air University, Aviation and Avionics Campus, Kamra
- The City School Kamra
- Bloomfield Hall School Kamra
- Fazaia Inter College Minhas
