= Shenyang J-6 =

Chinese variant of the Soviet MiG-19

Shenyang J-6 / F-6
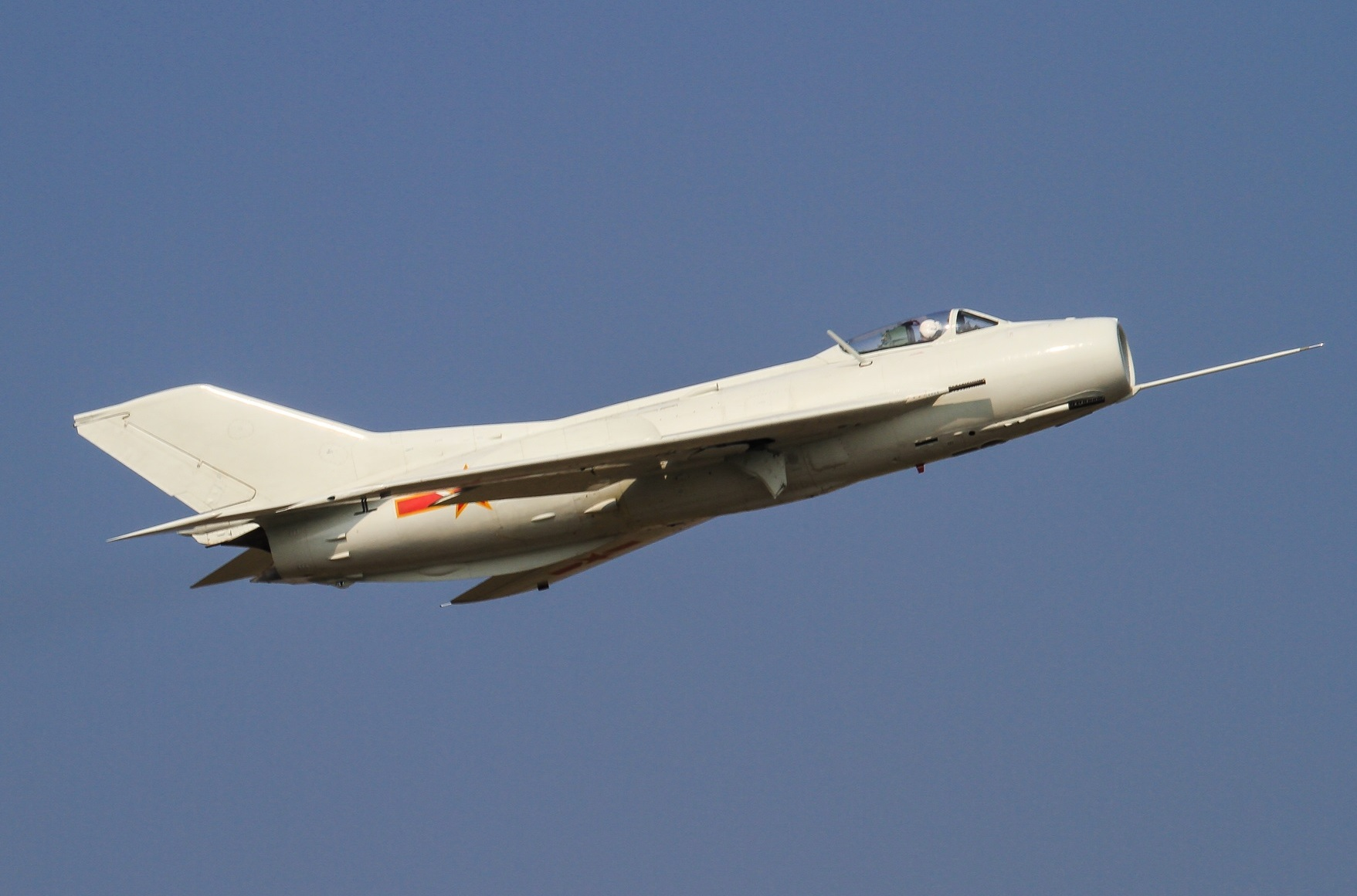
- A J-6 fighter flight display at the 2010 Zhuhai Air Show

General information
- Type: Fighter aircraft
- Manufacturer: Shenyang Aircraft Corporation
- Status: In service
- Primary users: People's Liberation Army Air Force (historical) Pakistan Air Force (historical); Korean People's Air Force; Bangladesh Air Force (historical)
- Number built: 4,500+ (including JJ-6 trainer)

History
- Manufactured: 1958–1986
- Introduction date: 29 April 1962 (1964, practical type)
- First flight: 30 September 1959
- Retired: Late 1990s (China); Mid 2002 (Pakistan)
- Developed from: Mikoyan-Gurevich MiG-19
- Developed into: Nanchang Q-5

The Shenyang J-6 (Chinese: 歼-6; designated F-6 for export versions; NATO reporting name: Farmer) is the Chinese version of the Soviet MiG-19 'Farmer' fighter.

== Design and development ==
Although the MiG-19 had a comparatively short life in Soviet service, the Chinese came to value its agility, turning performance, and powerful cannon armament, and produced it for their own use between 1958 and 1981. While the basic Soviet-built MiG-19 has been retired from all nations, the Shenyang J-6 still flies for nine of its original 15 operators, however, in a very limited capacity. The J-6 airframe contributed to the Chinese ground attack version, the Q-5, which still flies for numerous nations.

The J-6 was considered "disposable" and was intended to be operated for only 100 flight hours (or approximately 100 sorties) before being overhauled. The Pakistan Air Force was often able to extend this to 130 hours with diligent maintenance.

A number of J-6 based at Liancheng and Yangtang-li bases appeared to have been converted into unmanned aircraft. The first converted aircraft took flight in 1995, with work on unmanned J-6 was first reported in 2013.

=== Description ===
The J-6 has a maximum speed at altitude of 1,540 km/h (960 mph), Mach 1.45. Service ceiling is 17,900 m (58,700 ft). Combat radius with two drop tanks is about 640 km (400 mi). The aircraft is powered by two Liming Wopen-6A (Tumansky R-9) turbojet engines. In addition to the internal cannon armament, most have provision for four wing pylons for up to 250 kg (550 lb) each, with a maximum ordnance load of 500 kg (1,100 lb). Typical stores include unguided bombs, 55 mm rocket pods, or PL-2/PL-5 (Chinese versions of Soviet K-13) air-to-air missiles.

== Operational history ==
=== East Asia ===
==== China ====
The first use and loss of a U.S. fighter to a J-6 was in 1965 when a USAF Lockheed F-104 Starfighter piloted by Captain Philip E. Smith was intercepted by a PLAAF aircraft after illegally flying into Chinese airspace over Hainan Island. His Starfighter took cannon fire which damaged a portion of his wing and missile mount. Smith attempted to attack the defending aircraft and stated he received missile tone on the MiG but, shortly after pressing his missile firing button, his Starfighter lost all power. He ejected and was captured. Smith was held prisoner until he was released on 15 March 1973, due to improving US-China relations following U.S. President Richard Nixon's visit to China in 1972.

==== Vietnam ====
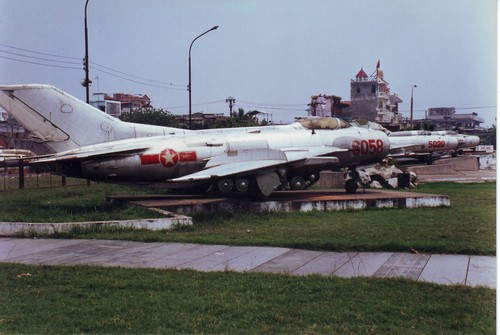
Shenyang J-6 fighter at Vietnamese People's Air Force Museum, Hanoi

The Vietnam People's Air Force (VPAF) began receiving the J-6 at the end of Operation Rolling Thunder, which ended in 1968. Despite their limited numbers, J-6s were involved in extensive combat during Operation Linebacker and Operation Linebacker II. The VPAF claimed seven victories over U.S. aircraft using the J-6, all of which were F-4 Phantom IIs.

The North Vietnamese government decided in early 1969 to strengthen its air defenses by creating a third jet fighter unit, the 925th Fighter Regiment. This unit would consist of late model MiG-17s and the newly acquired MiG-19s (nearly all of which were Shenyang J-6s from the People's Republic of China [PRC]). The regiment was established at Yen Bai, and by April 1969, nine combat-rated MiG-19 pilots were posted for combat duty. While some of North Vietnam's MiG-17s and all of their MiG-21s were supplied by the Soviet Union, the MiG-19s (J-6 models) were supplied by the PRC, which seldom exceeded 54 MiG-19s in number.

While the J-6 lacked mounts for early air-to-air missiles, unlike early model F-4 Phantom IIs, it was armed with cannon, effective in ACM. VPAF J-6s had three 30 mm cannon which "were notable for their large muzzle flash". The aircraft were loaded with 90 rounds per cannon, giving approximately six seconds of firing time. A two second burst of 90 shells could hit a US aircraft with 81 lb (37 kg) of metal. This contrasted with the small U.S. 20 mm cannon such as the M61 Vulcan which would deliver 39 lb (18 kg) of metal.

On 2 June 1972 a J-6 was the first recorded jet fighter to be shot down in aerial combat by cannon fire at supersonic speeds, by a USAF F-4 Phantom flown by Phil Handley. According to the VPAF, from 1965 to 1972, North Vietnamese J-6s shot down 13 enemy aircraft and helicopters, while five J-6s were lost (four shot down by enemy aircraft and one by friendly fire) and one pilot was killed.

==== Air-to-air victories ====
The following are Chinese and Vietnamese air-to-air kills, confirmed by US sources; all were achieved with 30 mm cannon shells.

MiG-19/J-6 air combat victories, 1965-1972
Date	MiG-19 pilot/unit	Aircraft destroyed	Destroyed aircraft unit/comments
1965-09-20	Chinese pilot/s; unknown unit	F-104C Starfighter	USAF 435th Tactical Fighter Squadron.
1967-08-21	Chinese pilot/s; unknown unit	(2) A-6 Intruders	USN VA-196.
1972-05-10	Vietnamese 925th Fighter Regiment (FR)	F-4D Phantom II	USAF 555th TFS
1972-05-10	Vietnamese 925th FR	F-4E	USAF 58th TFS
1972-05-18	Vietnamese 925th FR	F-4D	USAF 421st TFS

==== Kampuchea ====
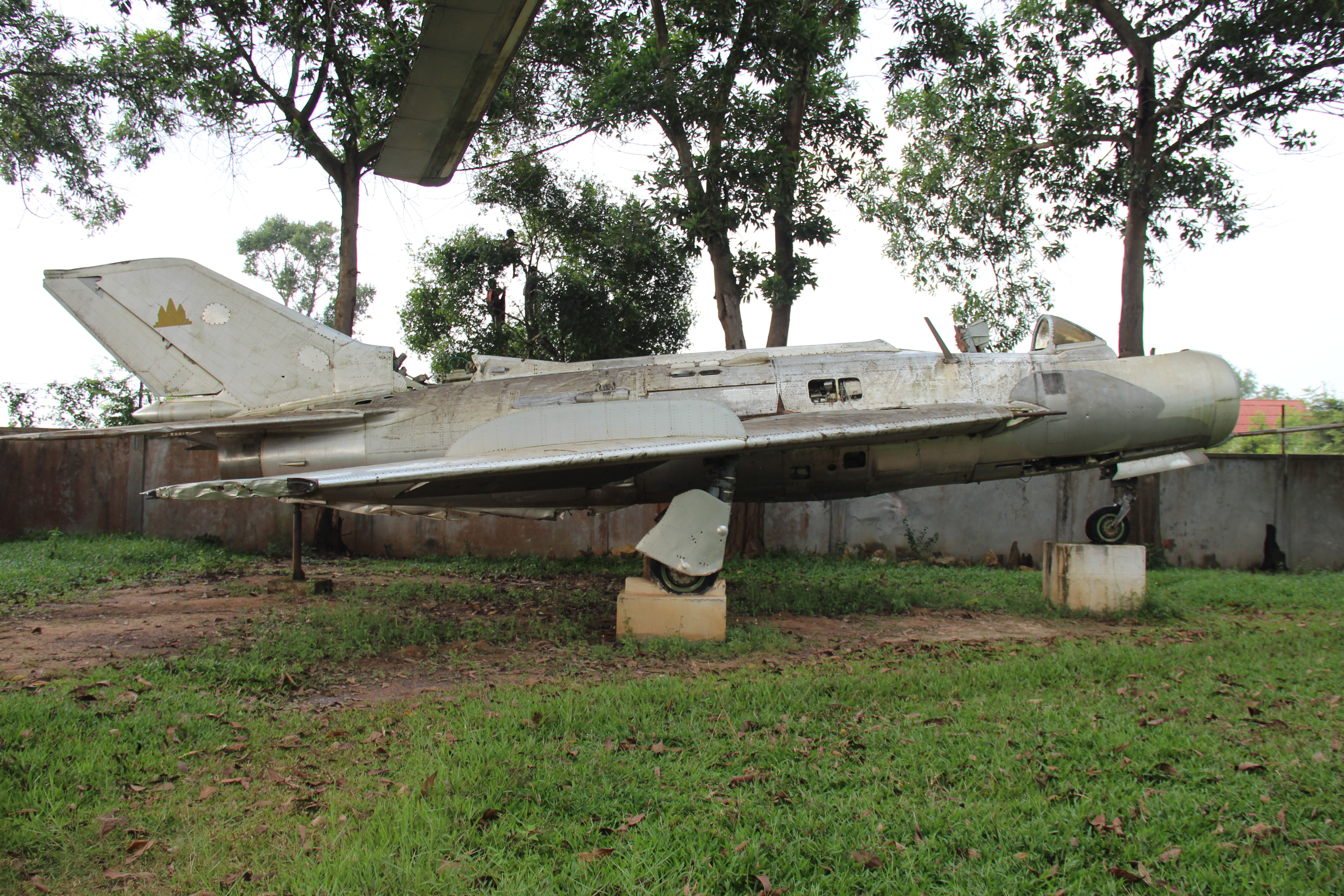
A Cambodian J-6C on display.

In the era of Khmer Rouge control of Cambodia (1975–1979), Chinese-supplied Khmer J-6s participated in Kampuchea-Vietnamese border clashes for ground attacks. During the Vietnamese invasion in 1978, the Cambodian aircraft were reluctant to take-off to intercept the Vietnamese ones, thus the Vietnamese captured a number of J-6s and put them on public display.

=== Pakistan ===
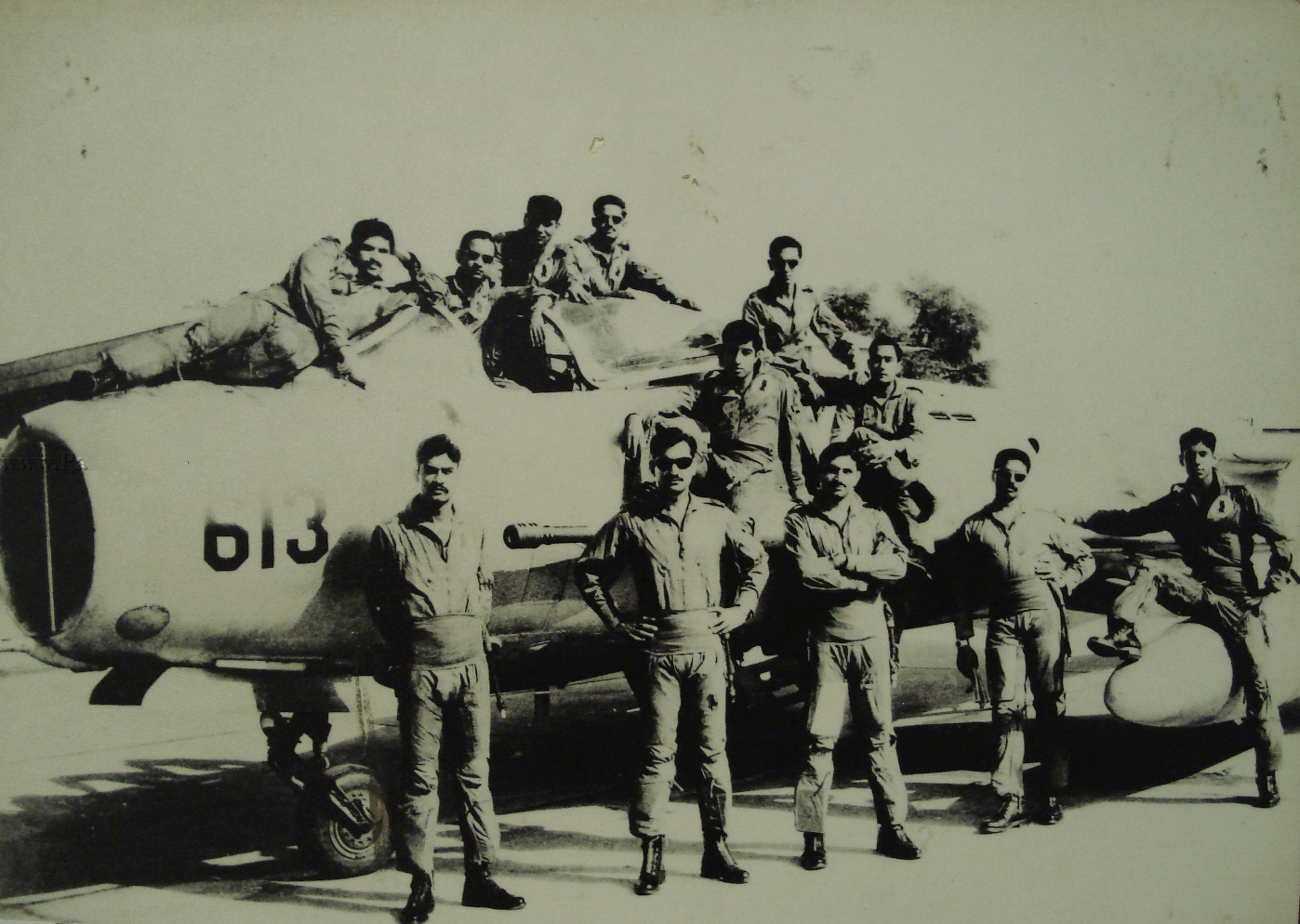
PAF Pilots from the No. 25 Squadron with a Shenyang F-6 in 1968

Between 1965 and 1980, the Pakistan Air Force (PAF) received 260 F-6 fighters which went on to serve with 10 PAF squadrons at various times. During their service, Pakistani F-6s also underwent 140 modifications at the Pakistan Aeronautical Complex to improve its capabilities in the interceptor and close air support roles. These modifications included installation of Martin-Baker ejection seats, gun cameras, western avionics, AIM-9B/J/P missiles, French 68mm SNEB rockets, underbelly gondola-style fuel tanks and a special ground power unit, to quickly start the engines and shorten scramble time.

==== 1971 Indo-Pakistani War ====
When the 1971 War broke out, the PAF had operationalized three F-6 squadrons which were the No. 11, No. 23 & No. 25 Squadrons. The F-6s of these squadrons collectively flew 945 sorties out of which 834 were combat ones.

===== Air to Air Combat =====
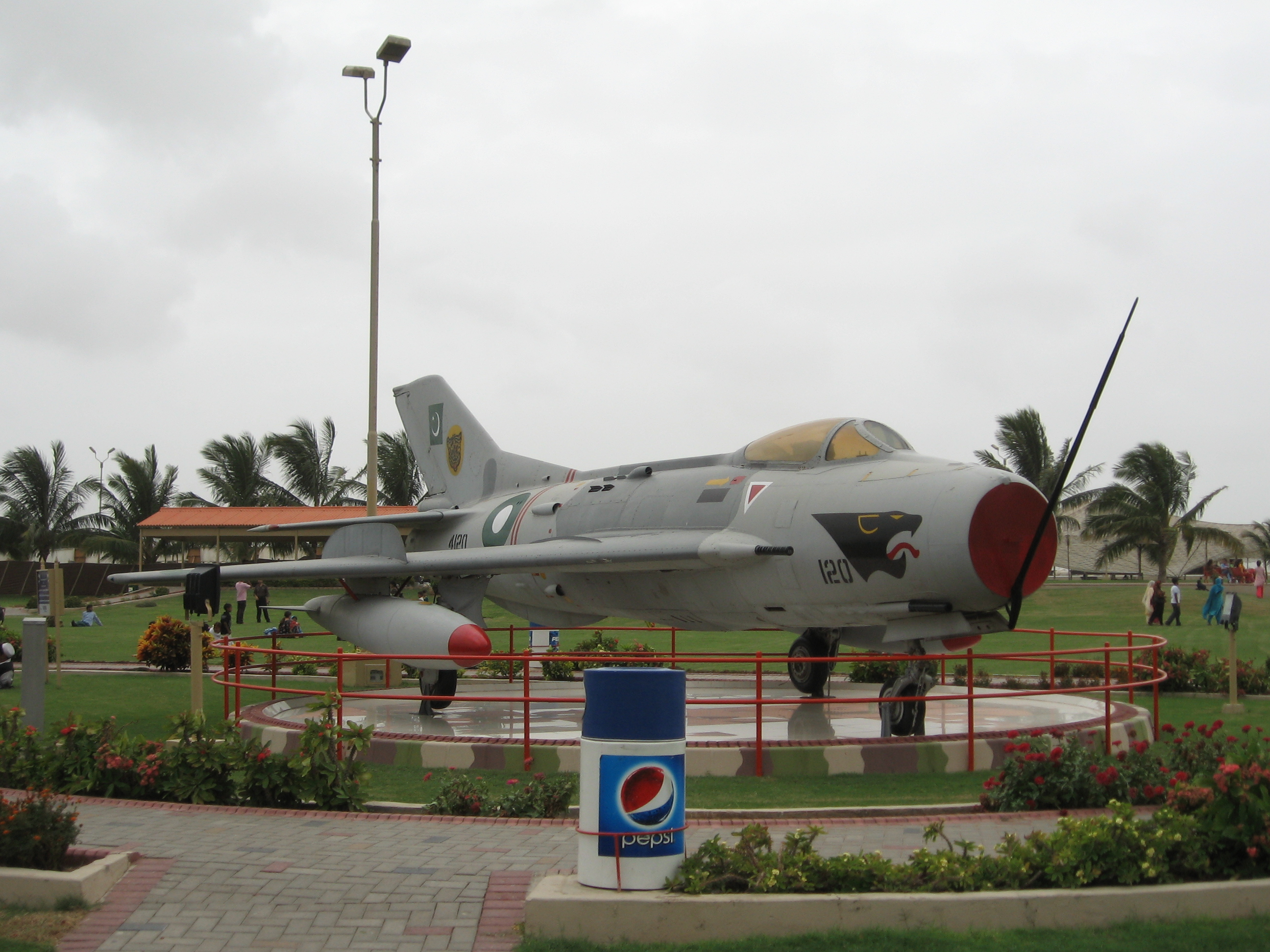
A retired Pakistani F-6 on display.

Throughout the war, the F-6 flew 650 Air Defence sorties in which they shot down approximately 8 Indian warplanes while damaging 2 more.

On 4 December 1971, Flight Lieutenant Javaid Latif of No. 23 Squadron shot down an Su-7 over Risalewala Airfield while Flying Officer Qazi Javed of No. 25 Squadron shot down a Hawker Hunter over Mianwali Airfield.

On 5 December 1971, Wing Commander Saad Hatmi (the Officer Commanding of No. 25 Squadron) and his wingman Flight Lt. Shahid Raza shot down 2 Indian Hunters near Sakesar.

On 7 December 1971, Flight Lt. Atiq Sufi of No. 11 Squadron shot down an Su-7 near Samba.

On 8 December 1971, Wing Commander Hashmi shot down a Su-7 which was attacking the Risalewala Airfield.

On 14 December 1971, Flight Lieutenant Amir Sharif of No. 11 Squadron claimed to have shot down a superior IAF MiG-21 over Shakargarh.

===== Ground Attack =====
Moreover, the F-6 flew 184 Ground Attack sorties where their 3 x 30 mm guns and 57 mm S-5 rockets were particularly effective against Indian armour, military vehicles, bunkers, and troop concentrations. Their Close Air Support missions at Shakargarh were the most successful.

At the end of the war, the PAF had lost two F-6s to ground fire while losing one F-6 to an Indian Su-7. An F-6 was also lost to friendly fire.

Some notable Pakistani F-6 pilots are Mushaf Ali Mir who later became the PAF's Chief, Wajid Ali Khan who was taken as a POW after being shot down by Indian AAA, he later became a Member of the Parliament in Canada and Syed Manzoor ul Hassan Hashmi. The single-seat F-6 was retired from the Pakistan Air Force in 2002 and replaced with the Chengdu F-7P/PG aircraft.

=== Albania ===
Albanian Air Force J-6s replaced the J-5s on the border to intercept Yugoslav incursions into Albanian airspace. However, the J-6 was ineffective against the faster Yugoslav MiG-21 'Fishbed'. Once the F-7A became available, the J-6 was redeployed to protect Tirana. As of 2005 all Albanian fighters were grounded due to a lack of spare parts.

=== Africa ===
==== Somalia ====
Somalia ordered at least eleven F-6Cs and two FT-6s in 1979. Deliveries started in 1980. They were used during border skirmishes with Ethiopia in 1981, and they also saw combat during the Somali Rebellion, in the second half of the 1980s and until 1991.

==== Sudan ====
Twelve F-6 fighters and two FT-6 trainers were reportedly delivered to the Sudanese Air Force, starting in 1973. Moreover, twelve F-6Cs were delivered between 1981 and 1983. Another batch of twelve F-6Cs might have been acquired in 1990, as well as two FT-6s in 2001. Sudanese F-6s participated in the Second Sudanese Civil War, from the 1980s to the early 1990s. One F-6 was claimed shot down by the rebels in 1988, and two more in the autumn of 1991.

==== Tanzania ====
The Tanzania Air Force Command received its first batch of twelve F-6s starting in June 1973. An additional twelve F-6Cs and up to four FT-6s were also delivered in 1982. Tanzanian F-6s participated in the 1978–1979 Uganda-Tanzania War. However, they aren't known to have been involved in any air-to-air combats.

==== Zambia ====
Twelve F-6s were delivered to the Zambian Air Force, probably between 1976 and 1978. On 8 June 1980, Zambian F-6s intercepted and shot down an Angolan Yakovlev Yak-40, under unknown circumstances.

=== Iran–Iraq War ===
During the 1980–88 Iran–Iraq War, both sides deployed J-6 fighter jets. Documents from the US Defense Intelligence Agency released under the Freedom of Information Act (United States) on Chinese arms sales to Iran reveal that between 1980 and 1987 China delivered 100 J-6 fighter jets to Iran. Iraq's J-6 fighters were transferred from the Egyptian Air Force. Most missions J-6s performed during the Iran-Iraq War were air-to-ground attack.

== Variants ==
=== Mass production type ===
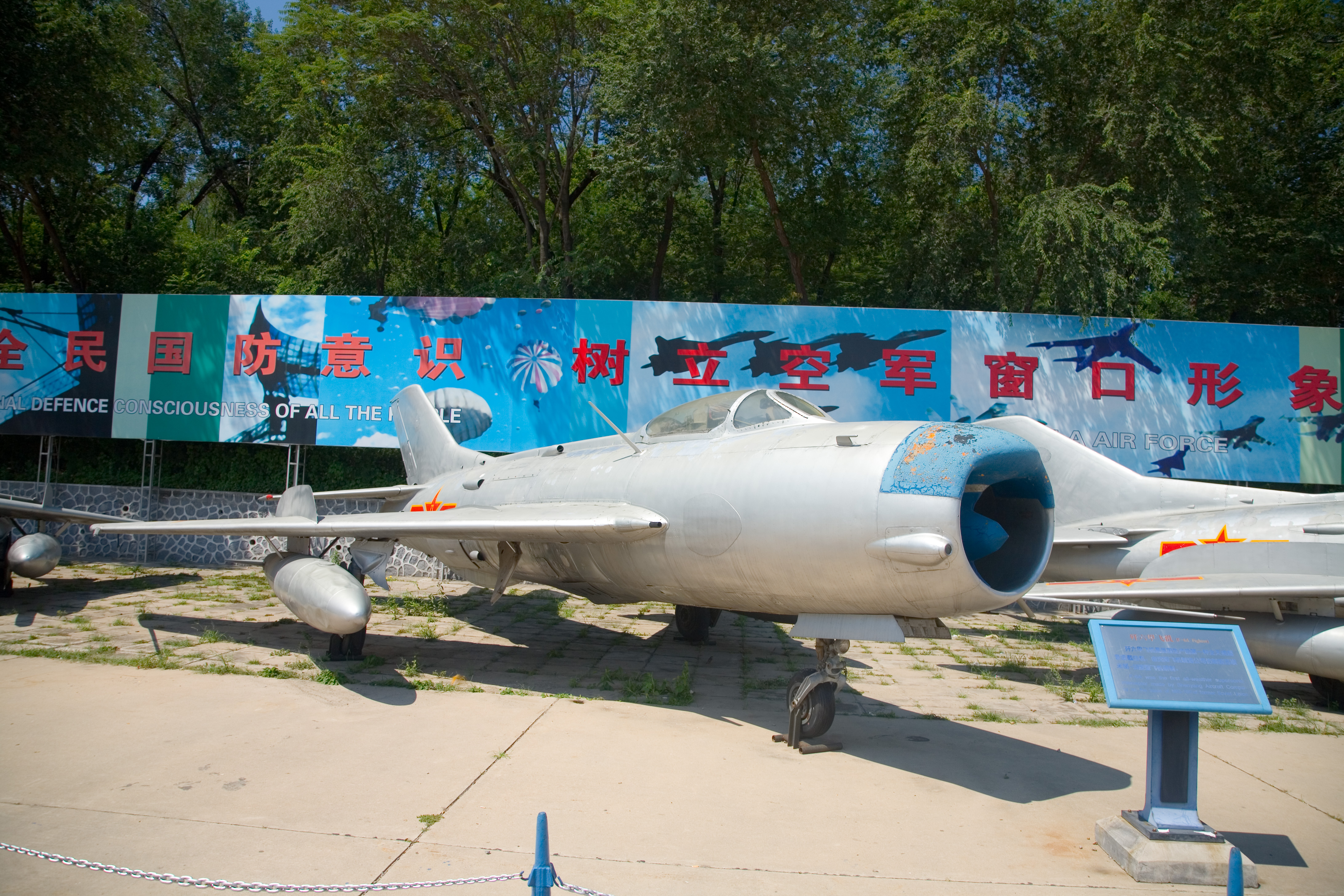
J-6A

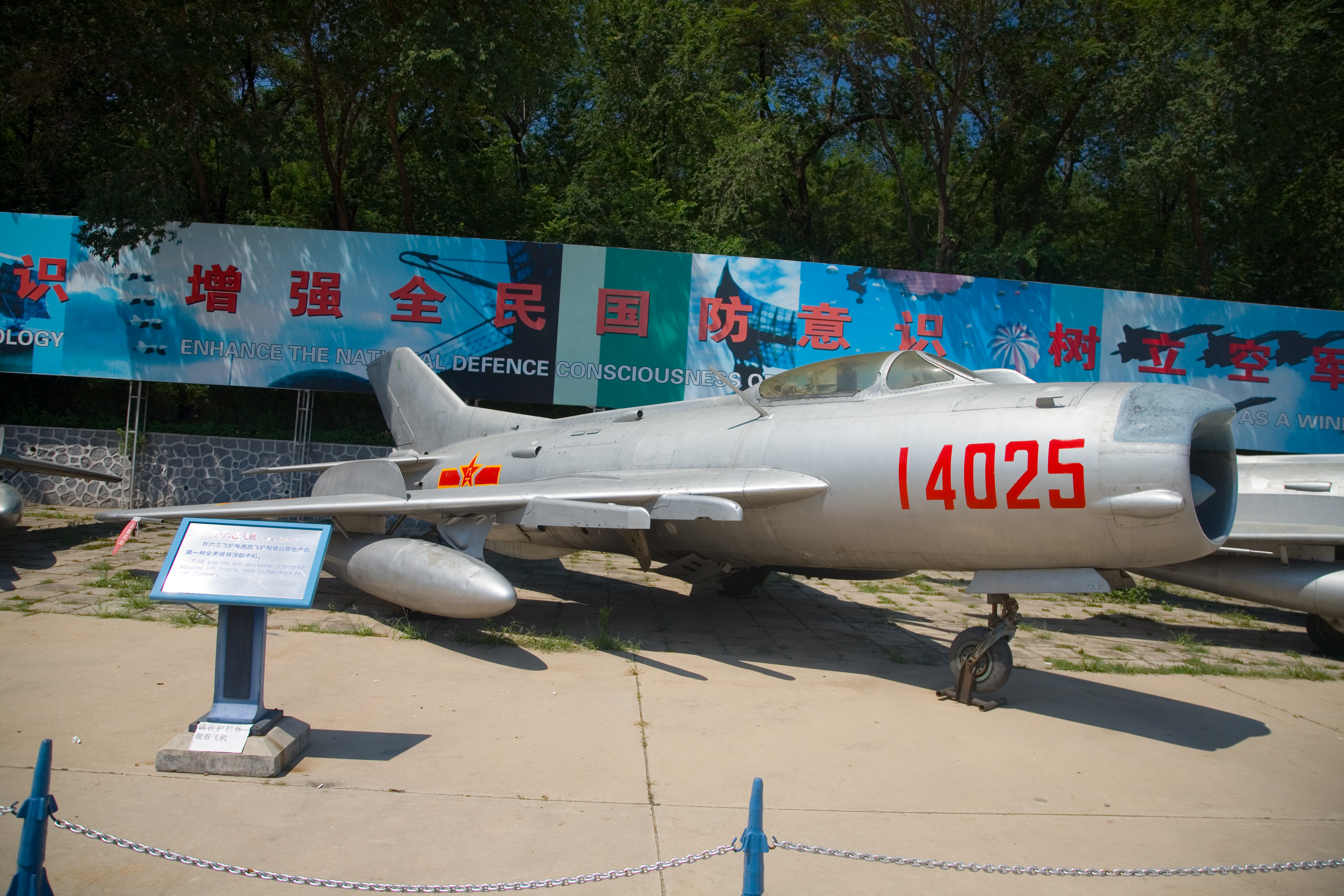
J-6B

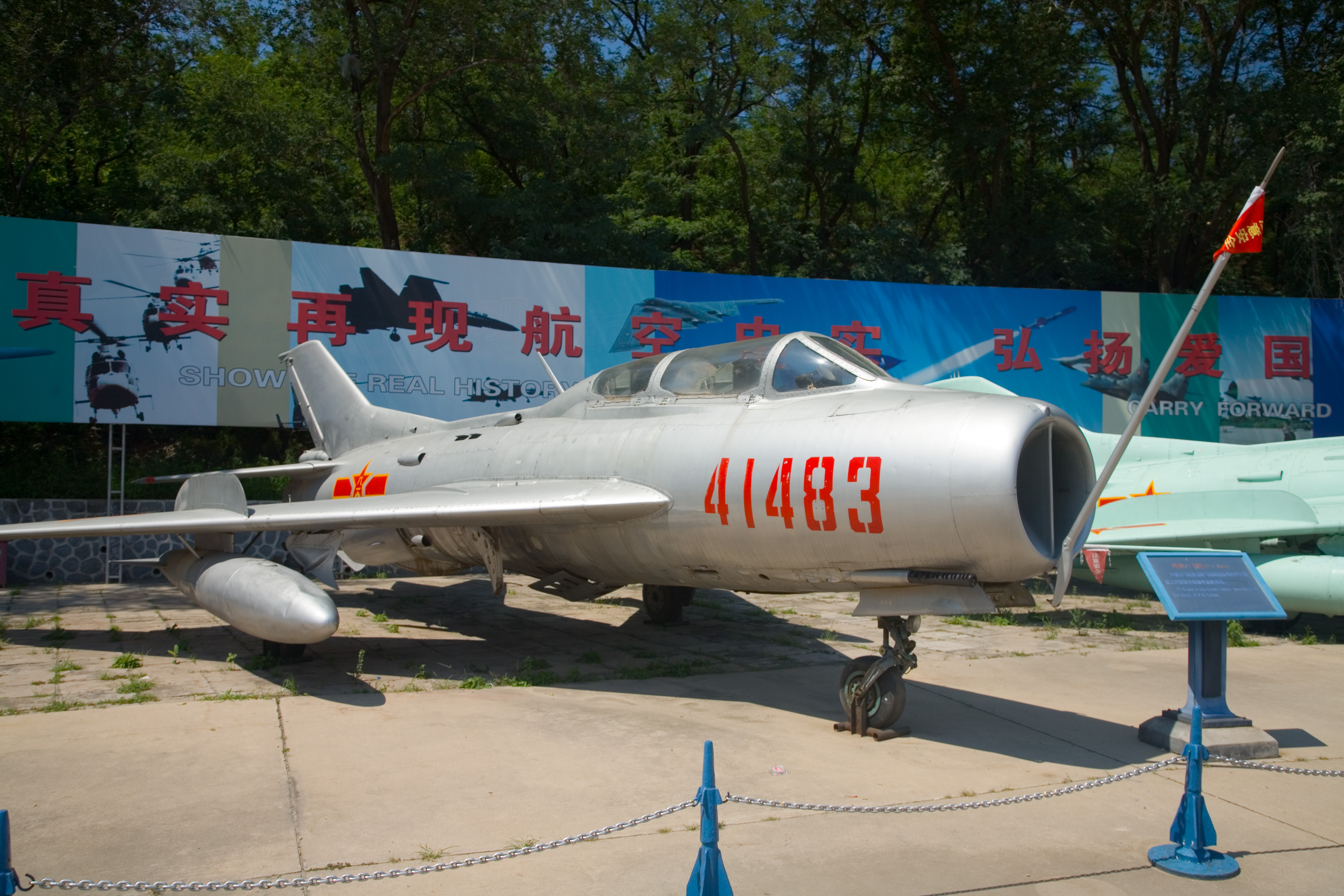
Two-seat JJ-6

- Shenyang J-6 – (a.k.a. Type 59, Dongfeng-102, Product 47 and F-6) Despite having no suffix to the designation, the J-6 appeared after the initial production of the J-6A had begun. The J-6 was equivalent, but not identical, to the MiG-19S.
- Shenyang J-6A – Production of the J-6 restarted after new assembly jigs, and other assistance, acquired from the USSR. Similar to MiG-19PF, an all-weather radar-equipped interceptor with two NR-30 30mm cannon. Exported as the F-6A.
- J-6B – (a.k.a. Type 59B, Dongfeng-105 and Jianjiji-6 Yi) Similar to MiG-19PM "Farmer-D", interceptor with two PL-1 (Chinese version of Soviet K-5 (AA-1 'Alkali') beam-riding air-to-air missiles; it is unclear if the J-6B retains its cannon. Only 19 J-6Bs were built by Nanchang Aircraft Mfg. Co. before the programme was terminated.
- J-6C – (a.k.a. Jianjiji-6 Bing, Product 55 and F-6C) Day fighter version with three 30mm cannons and braking parachute at the base of the rudder. This cannon's codename is Type 30-1.
- Shenyang J-6D – Advanced version of the J-6A with radome on the splitter plate (rather than the shock cone centerbody) for a Chinese-made radar. May also have been designated J-6 Xin. Another name is "J-6III". The name D-type was coined as a piggyback.
- Shenyang/Tianjin JJ-6 – (Jianjiji Jiaolianji – fighter trainer, a.k.a. Product 48 and FT-6) Chinese designed two-seat trainer, stretched 84 cm (33.1 in) to accommodate second seat, armed with one 30 mm cannon.
- Shenyang JZ-6 – (Jianjiji Zhenchaji – reconnaissance fighter) Dedicated reconnaissance version with fuselage camera pack replacing cannon. In April 2006, it was reported that the PLAAF 3rd Reconnaissance Regiment, 26 Air Division based in Nanjing MR, was the last regiment to actively fly the JZ-6 refusing to convert to the JZ-8F. Exported as the Shenyang FR-6.
- Guizhou J-6A – J-6A aircraft upgraded to carry two PL-2 (Pi Li – Thunderbolt) infrared-homing air-to-air missiles. The first flight was on 21 December 1975.
- J-6W - target drone variant, first reported in 2013. An estimated 200 drones have been converted as of 2026, stationed in at least five PLAAF bases in Fujian and one base in Guangdong, according to the Mitchell Institute for Aerospace Studies.

=== Prototype machine (including unfinished) ===
- Shenyang J-6A – (a.k.a. Type 59A, Dongfeng-103, Jianjiji-6 Jia) – Early production from 1958 to 1960 was sub-standard and not accepted by the PLAAF. Production was halted, the jigs scrapped, and production restarted with assistance from the USSR. The J-6A was equivalent to the MiG-19P. The maiden flight was made by Wang Shuhuai on 17 December 1958. Only around 100 aircraft from this version were produced. It was reported that the J-6A never actually passed the PLAAF's tests. The planes were of little operational value and suffered from quality issues, flight characteristics were much lower than those of the J-6.
- Shenyang J-6I – Single-seat day-fighter prototype with fixed shock cone on the intake splitter plate.
- Shenyang J-6II – Single-seat tactical fighter prototype with adjustable shock cone on a raked back intake splitter plate.
- Shenyang/Tianjin JJ-6 Testbed – Ejection seat testbed that succeeded H-5 ejection seat testbed.
- Xian BW-1 – Fly-by-wire flying controls test-bed for the Xian JH-7 flying control system.

== Operators ==
=== Current ===
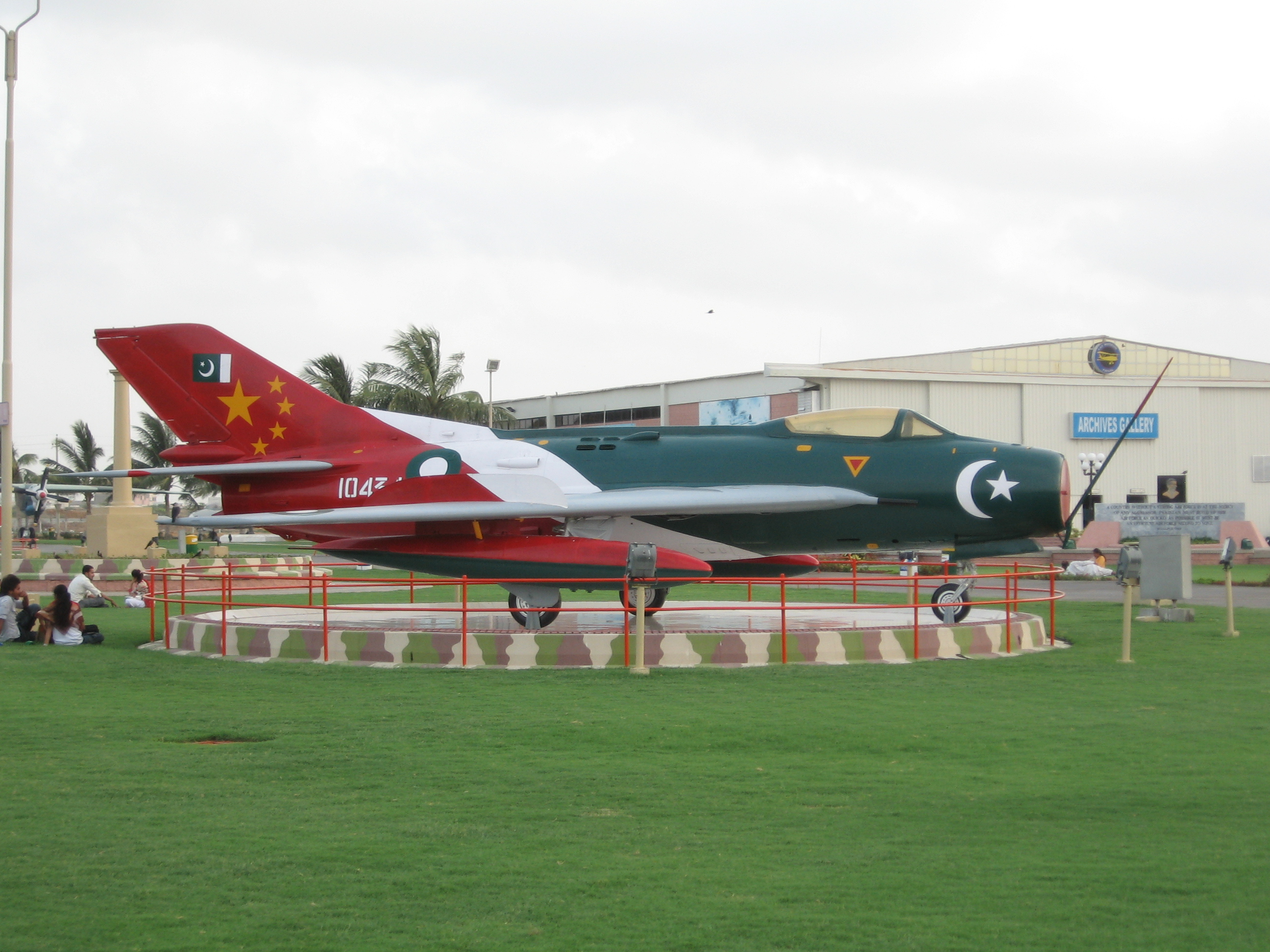
Pakistani Shenyang F-6 on display at Karachi Air Museum

Myanmar

- Myanmar Air Force – 1 F-6 fighter as of December 2023

North Korea

- North Korea Air Force – 97 F-6s fighters as of December 2023

Pakistan

- Pakistan Air Force − 9 FT-6 trainers as of December 2023, all F-6 fighters retired in 2002

Sudan

- Sudanese Air Force – 8 F-6 fighters as of December 2023

Tanzania

- Tanzanian Air Force – 3 F-6 fighters and 1 FT-6 trainer as of December 2023

=== Former ===
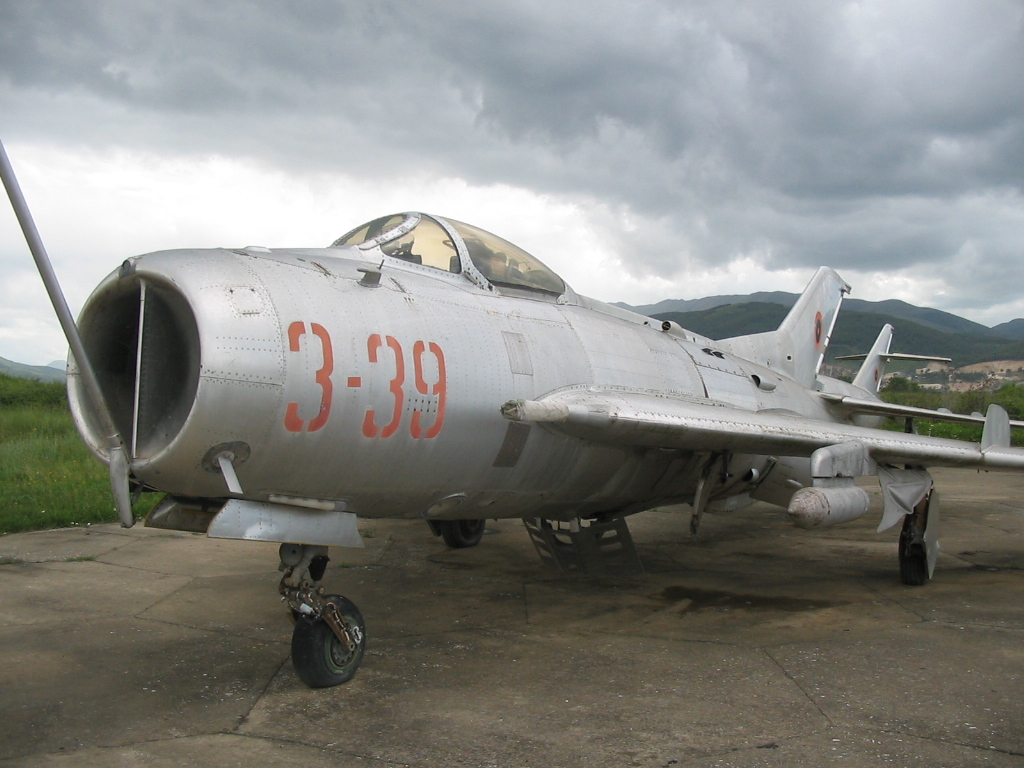
An Albanian Shenyang J-6C in Kucova Airbase.

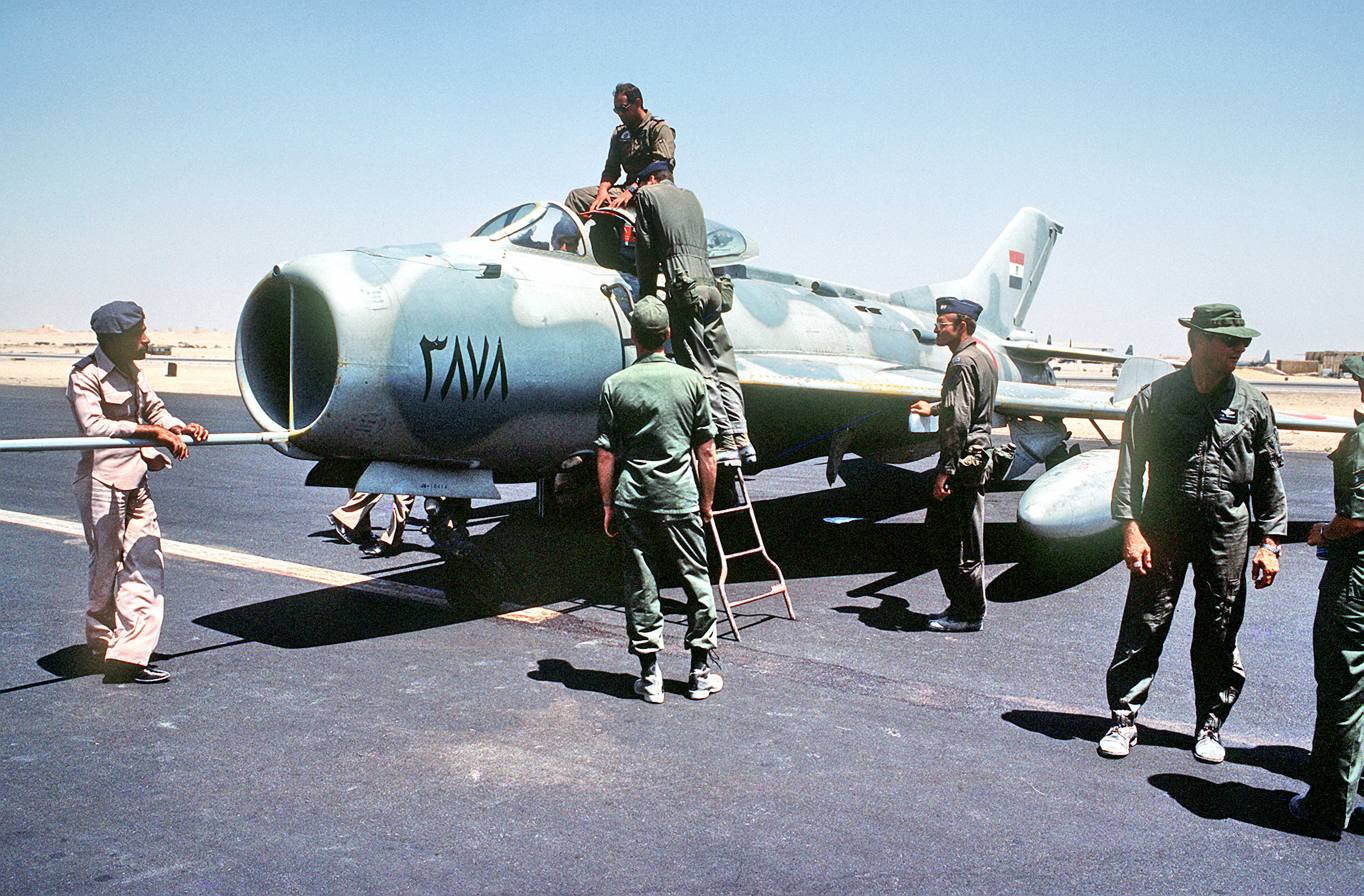
USAF personnel inspect an Egyptian F-6

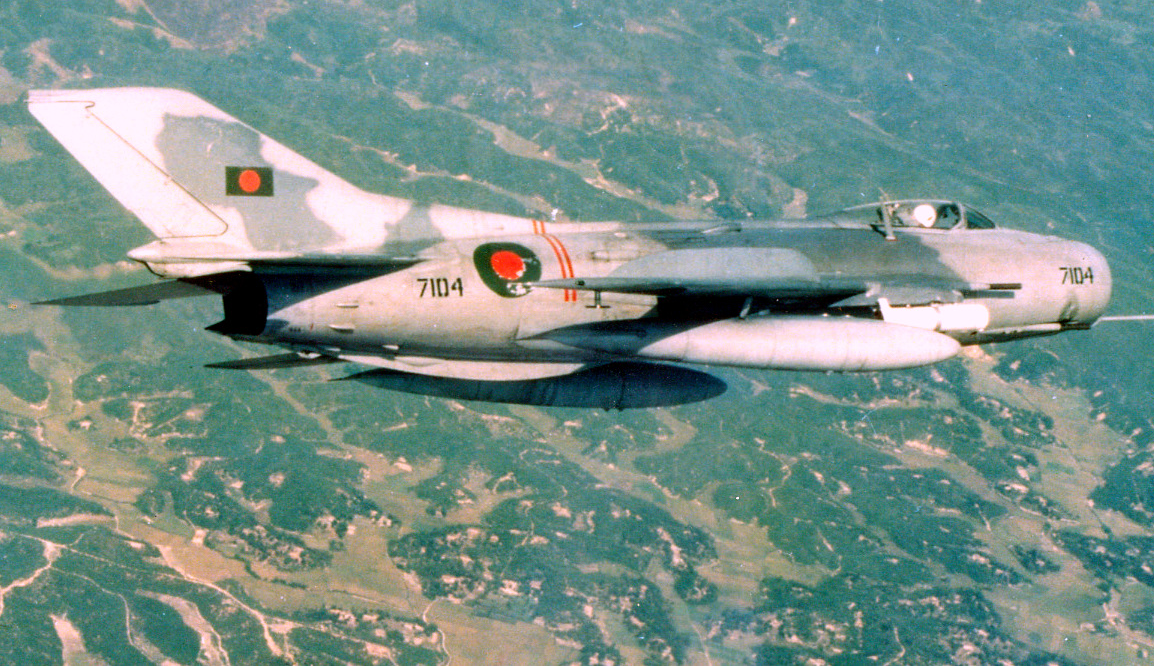
Bangladesh Air Force F-6 inflight

Albania

- Albanian Air Force – 71 F-6 and FT-6 delivered between 1965 and 1971 partly in exchange for MiG-19PMs according to the Stockholm International Peace Research Institute (SIPRI), while former Air Force commander Edip Ohri stated that an initial batch of 12 aircraft was received followed by an additional batch of 95 aircraft. Retired in 2005. As of 2019, some remain in storage.

Bangladesh

- Bangladesh Air Force

China

- People's Liberation Army Air Force – Operated 35 JJ-6 ca. December 2019
- People's Liberation Army Naval Air Force – Operated 14 JJ-6 ca. December 2019

Democratic Kampuchea

- Air Force of the Revolutionary Army of Kampuchea − 6 donated by China in 1978 in response to the Cambodian–Vietnamese War

Egypt

- Egyptian Air Force – 40 delivered by China in exchange for MiG-23s in 1979. Between 1982 and 1983, a further 50 were delivered. This second batch was assembled in Egypt. 44 F-6 and FT-6 were in service in 2011

Iran

- Islamic Republic of Iran Air Force − At least 16 were delivered between 1982 and 1984. According to SIPRI, the total number of aircraft delivered could be 22 or 25

Iraq

- Iraqi Air Force − 40 delivered between 1982 and 1983 through Egypt and Jordan. Operated an unknown number of aircraft prior to the 2003 invasion of Iraq

Somalia

- Somali Air Force – At least 30 delivered between 1980 and 1981. According to SIPRI, the total number of aircraft delivered could be up to 50. Somali F-6s were dumped and destroyed in the years following the disintegration of the SAC in 1991

Vietnam

- Vietnam People's Air Force – 44 delivered in 1968–1969, another 24 delivered in 1974.

Zambia

- Zambian Air Force – 8 F-6 fighters and 2 FT-6 trainers as of December 2023, retired by end of 2025.

== Specifications (J-6) ==
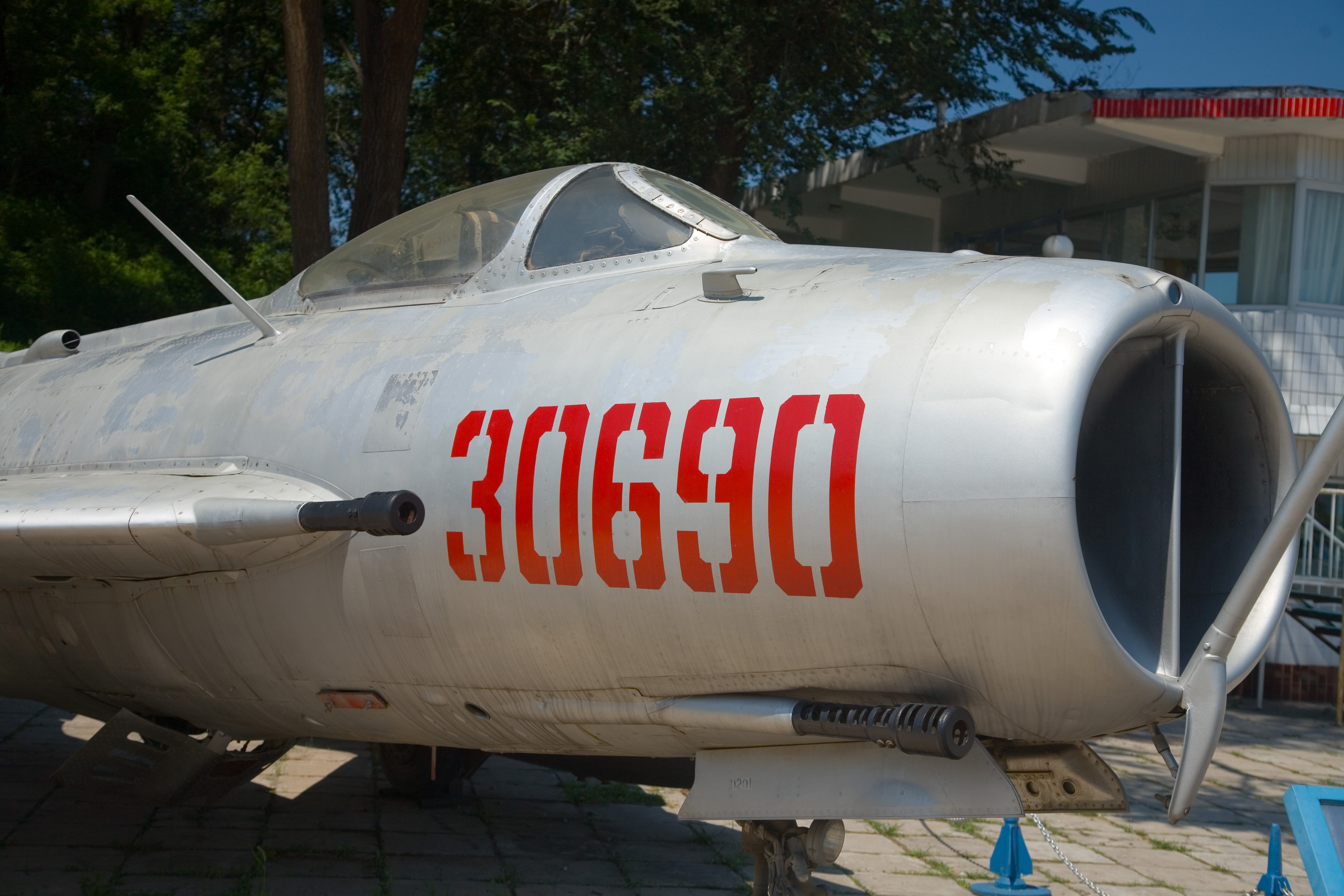
The nose of an F-6, showing the 30 mm cannons fitted in the right wing root and the lower body.

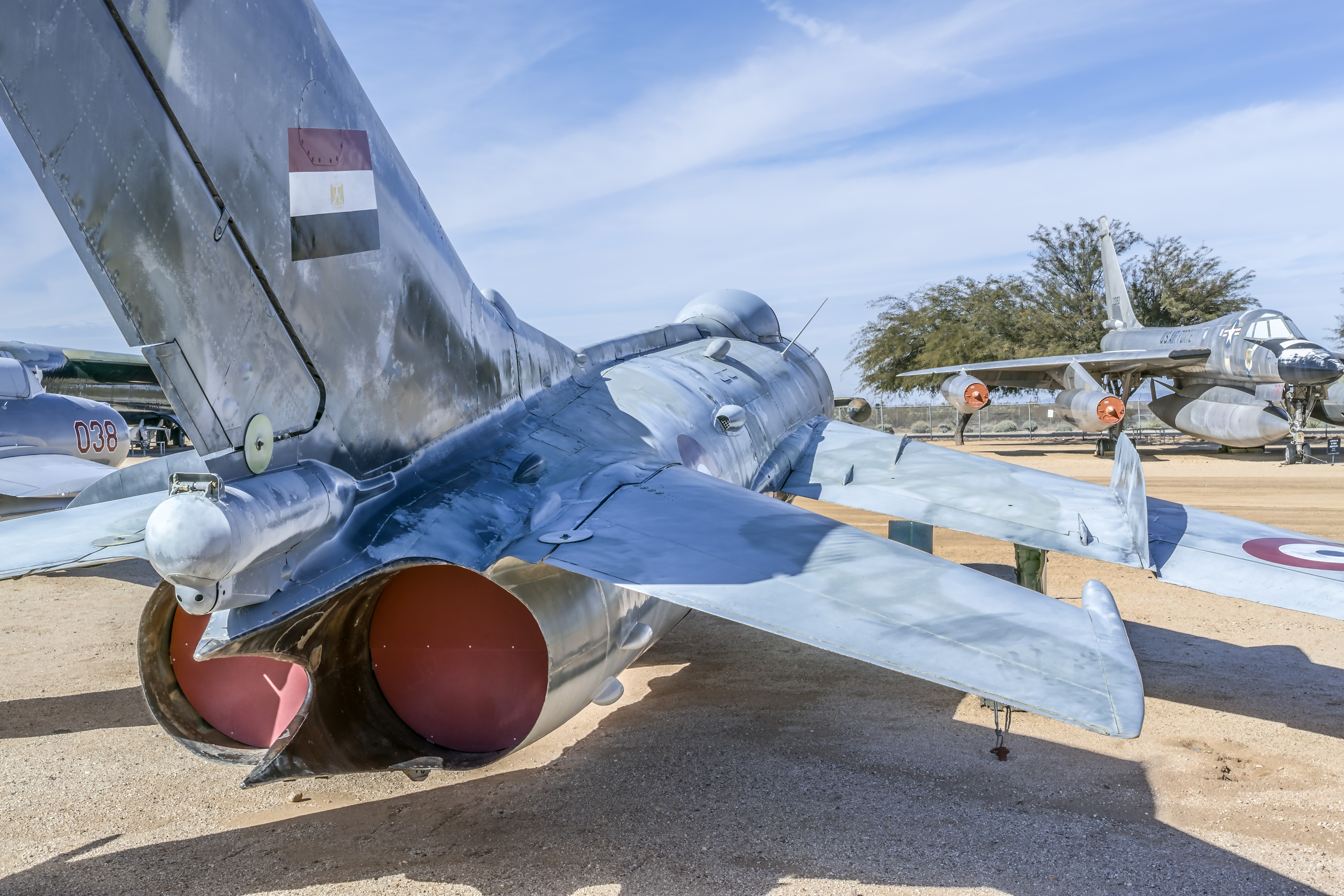
Rear twin engine exhaust nozzles

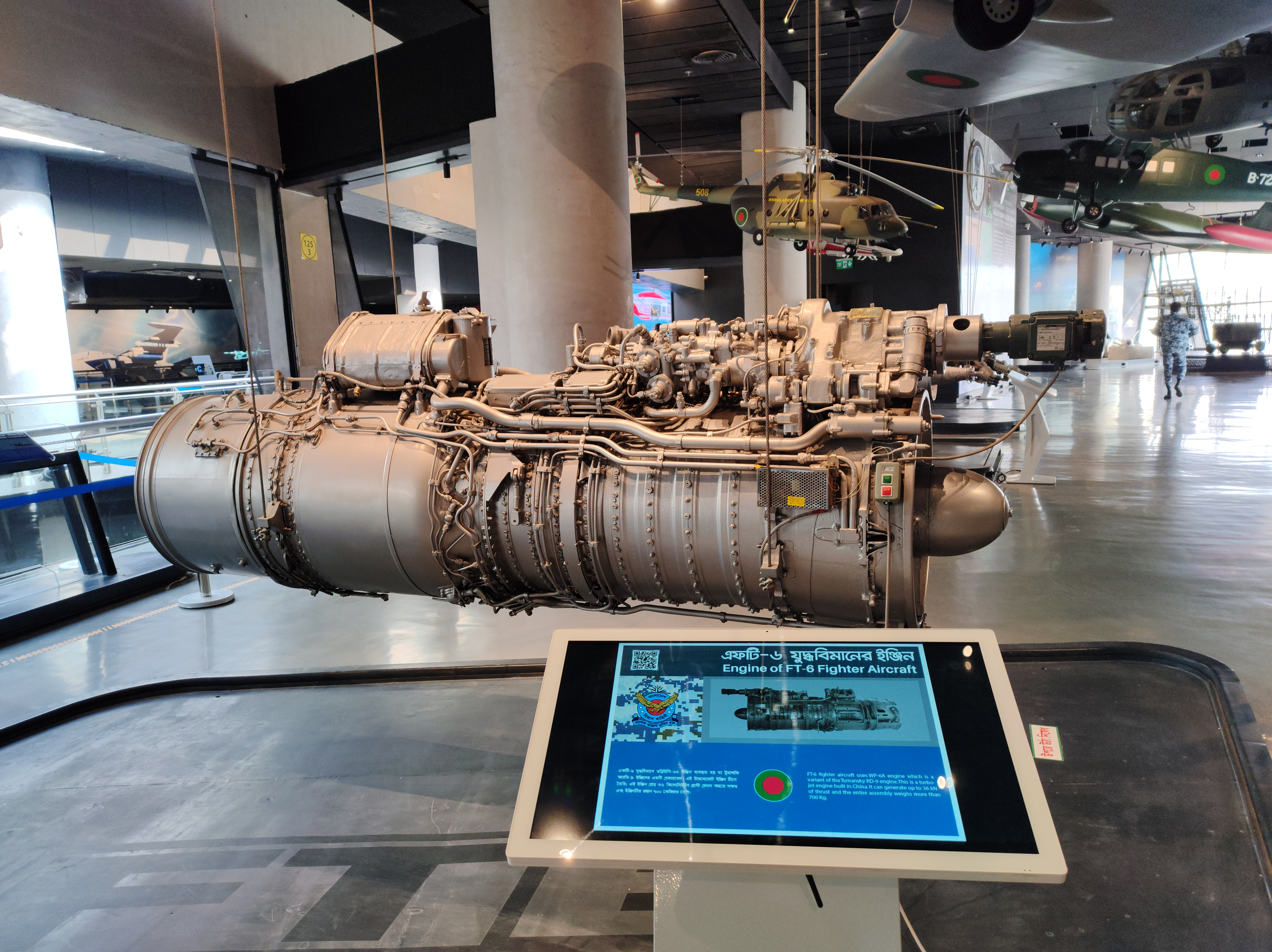
BAF FT-6's Wopen WP-6A turbojet engines on display at Bangladesh Military Museum

Data from Chinese aircraft : China's aviation industry since 1951, Combat aircraft since 1945

General characteristics

- Crew: 1 (JJ-6 trainer – 2)
- Length: 14.64 m (48 ft 0 in) (variants with nose pitot probe)

12.54 m (41.1 ft) (variants without nose pitot probe)

- Wingspan: 9 m (29 ft 6 in)
- Height: 3.885 m (12 ft 9 in)
- Wing area: 25.16 m^{2} (270.8 sq ft)
- Empty weight: 5,172 kg (11,402 lb) to 5,447 kg (12,009 lb)
- Max takeoff weight: 7,560 kg (16,667 lb) clean

8,662 kg (19,096 lb) with drop tanks
8,832 kg (19,471 lb) with drop tanks and rocket pods

- Fuel capacity: 1,735–1,800 kg (3,825–3,968 lb) internal

2,796 kg (6,164 lb) with drop tanks

- Powerplant: 2 × Wopen WP-6A afterburning turbojet engines, 25.5 kN (5,730 lbf) thrust each dry, 31.8 kN (7,160 lbf) with afterburner

Performance

- Maximum speed: 1,540 km/h (960 mph, 830 kn)
- Maximum speed: Mach 1.3
- Range: 1,400 km (870 mi, 760 nmi)
- Combat range: 640 km (400 mi, 350 nmi)
- Ferry range: 2,200 km (1,400 mi, 1,200 nmi) with drop tanks
- Endurance: 1 hour 43 minutes clean

2 hours 38 minutes with drop tanks

- Service ceiling: 15,800 m (51,800 ft) at military power

17,500–17,900 m (57,400–58,700 ft) with full afterburner

- Rate of climb: 180 m/s (35,000 ft/min)
- Take-off run: 900 m (3,000 ft) at full military power

515 m (1,690 ft) with full afterburner

- Landing run: 610 m (2,000 ft) with brake parachute

890 m (2,920 ft) without brake parachute

Armament

- 3x 30 mm NR-30 cannons (70 rounds per gun for wing guns, 55 rounds for fuselage gun)
- Up to 250 kg (550 lb) of unguided bombs or rocket pods or PL-2/PL-5 (Chinese versions of Soviet K-13 (NATO AA-2 'Atoll') and AIM-9 (for Pakistani F-6s only) air-to-air missiles on 4 underwing pylons

== See also ==
Related development

- Mikoyan-Gurevich MiG-19
- Nanchang Q-5

Aircraft of comparable role, configuration, and era

- Dassault Super Mystère
- North American F-100 Super Sabre

Related lists

- List of fighter aircraft
