= No. 23 Squadron PAF =

Air Superiority Squadron of the PAF

No. 23 Squadron Talons
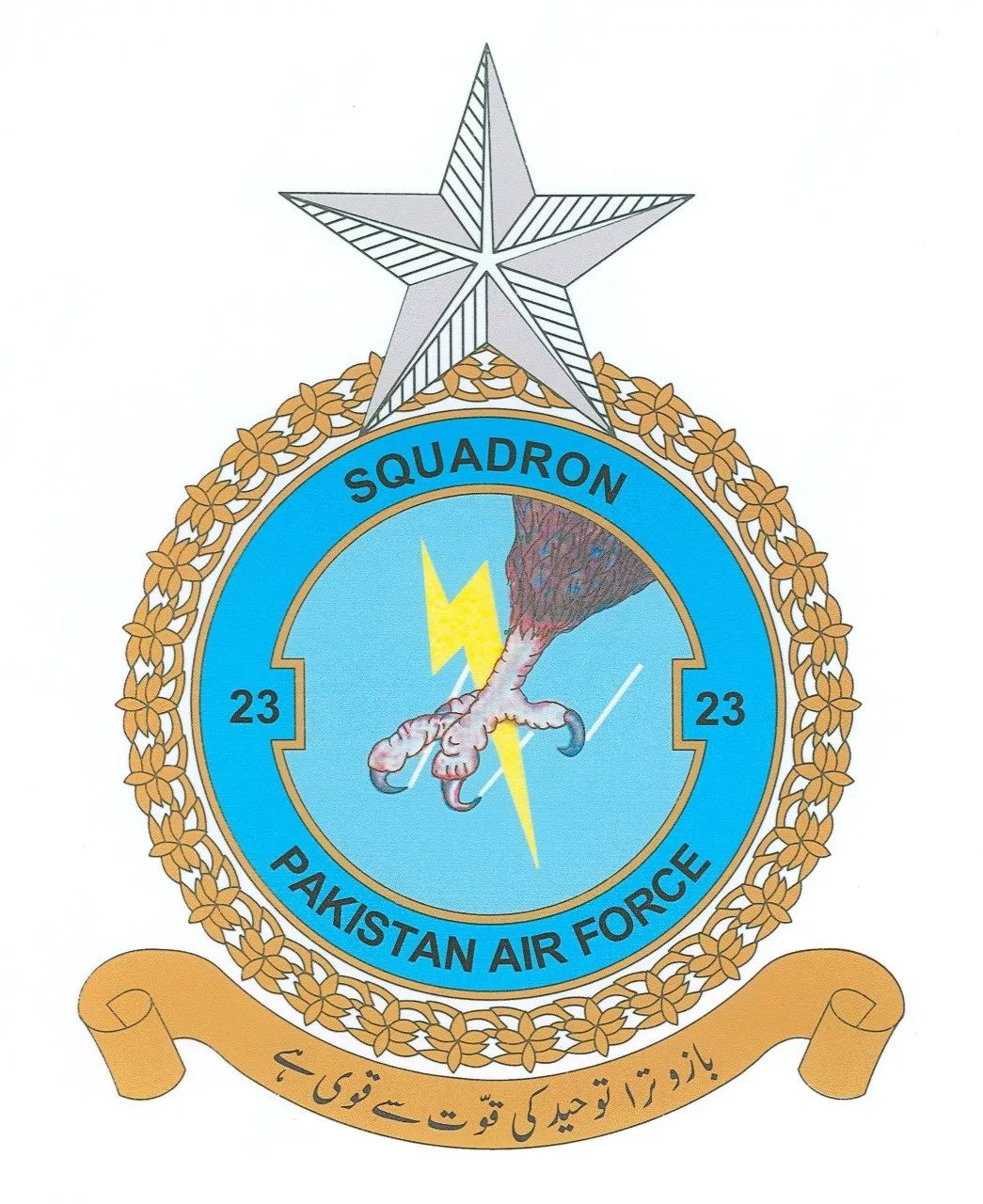
- Crest of the No. 23 Squadron of PAF
- Active: 16 March 1961 –
- Disbanded: 1964-1966
- Country: Pakistan
- Allegiance: Pakistan Armed Forces
- Branch: Pakistan Air Force
- Type: Fighter squadron
- Role: Air Superiority
- Part of: Western Air Command
- Airbase: PAF Base Samungli
- Nickname: Talons
- Mottos: Urdu:بازو ترا توحید کی قوت سے قوی ہے; English: Your arm is stronger than the death in belief
- Engagements: Indo-Pakistani War of 1971; Bajaur & Dir Operations; Spillover of Soviet - Afghan war in Pakistan; "1961 Pakistan Locust Outbreak".

Commanders
- Notable commanders: Squadron Leader A.M Nazir; Wing Commander Manzoor Hashmi

Aircraft flown
- Fighter: Hawker Fury; Shenyang F-6P
- Interceptor: Chengdu F-7PG

The No. 23 Squadron, nicknamed Talons, is an air superiority fighter squadron of the Pakistan Air Force. It is based at PAF Base Samungli in the Balochistan province of Pakistan and operates the Chengdu F-7PG aircraft.

== History ==
The No.23 Squadron was raised on 16 March 1961 at PAF Base Kohat equipped with Hawker Fury aircraft and was tasked with providing close air support for the army along with anti-locust operations.

=== Operations near the Durand Line ===
In May 1961 the Squadron participated in bombing strikes in the Bajaur & Dir areas during operations in the Khyber Pakhtunkhwa province of Pakistan. From May 21 to 24 and on 31 May 1961, the squadron flew close air support missions during which the pilots used the Hawker Fury's 60 lb bombs and 20 mm cannons to destroy various targets in the Bajaur valley. A total of 23 sorties were flown by the No. 23 Squadron during these missions.

=== 1961 Pakistan Locust Outbreak ===
From 16 to 17 November 1961, the squadron participated in "Exercise Hastings" during which it flew five sorties. Almost a week later, four aircraft and pilots from the No. 23 squadron were deployed at Drigh Road Base in Karachi for anti-locust operations during which it flew 28 missions from 21 to 30 November 1961.

=== Temporary disbandment ===
The squadron was numberplated on 4 March 1964 due to the retirement of Hawker Fury fighters from the Pakistan Air Force.

=== Reactivation ===
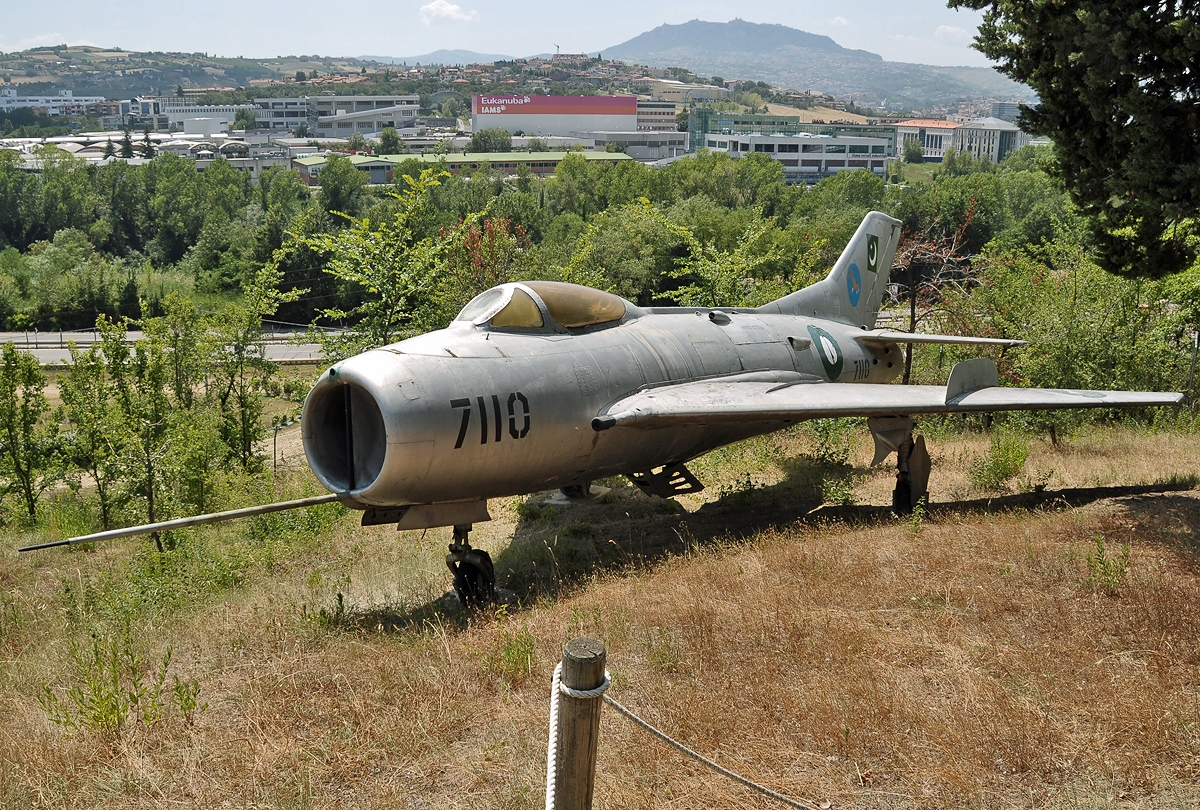
Shenyang F-6 of the No. 23 Squadron "Talons"

The squadron was reactivated on 8 February 1966 and equipped with the newly inducted Shenyang F-6P "Farmer" at PAF Base Sargodha. It was also assigned the task for converting pilots from other PAF squadrons on the F-6. Between June & September 1966, the squadron trained 23 pilots of various squadrons along with its own pilots. On 16 September, the squadron shifted to PAF Base Rafiqui at Shorkot for a couple of weeks.

=== 1971 War ===
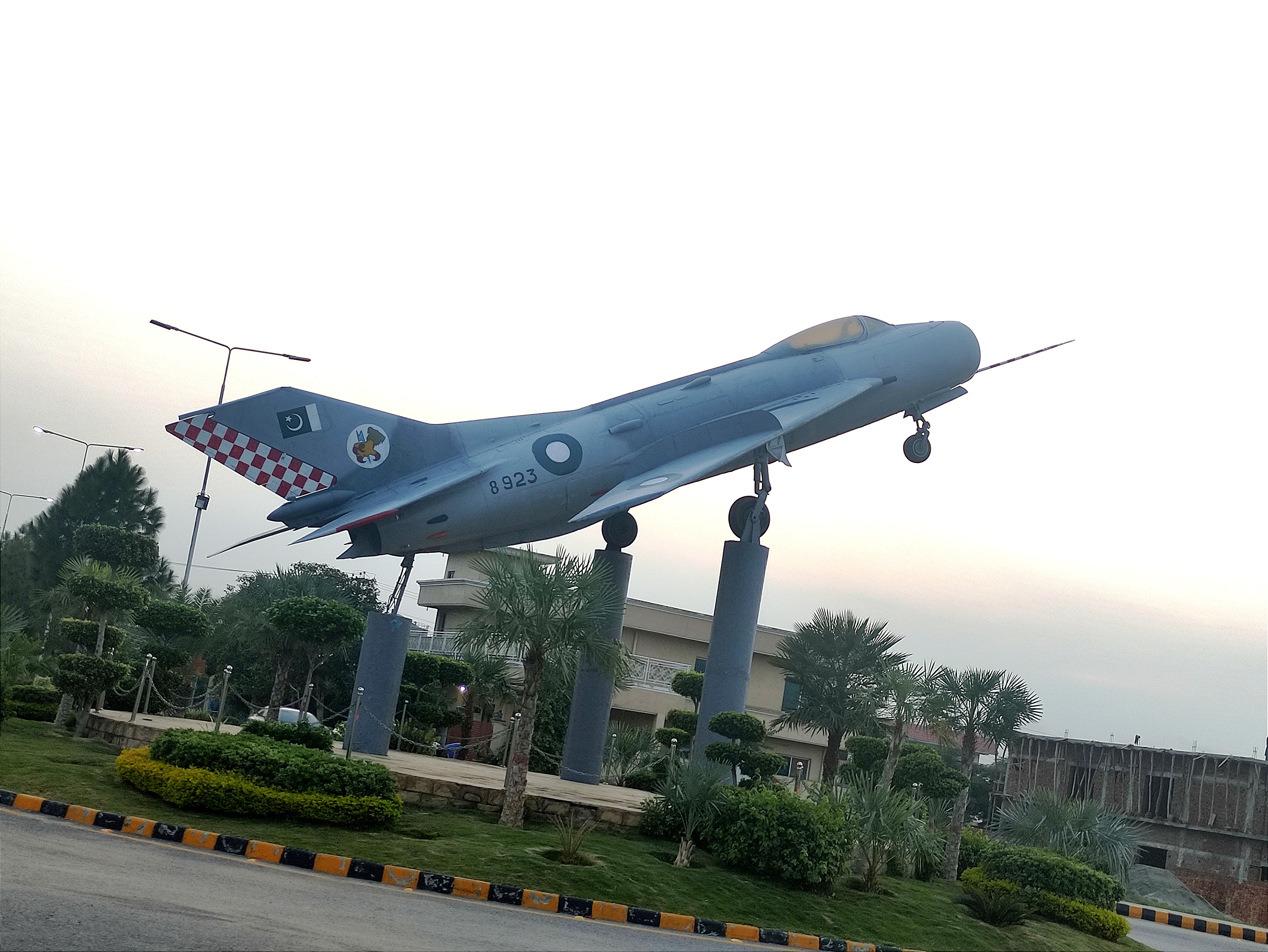
Shenyang F-6 "Farmer" of the No. 23 Squadron

On 13 October 1971, the squadron was deployed at Risalewala air base from where the squadron operated throughout the 1971 war.

On 4 December 1971 during a dogfight near Faisalabad, Flight Lieutenant Javed Latif shot down an Indian Su-7 (IAF Pilot "Harvinder Singh" from No. 222 Squadron IAF died) while his wingman Flying Officer Riffat Munir damaged another. On 8 December, the OC 23 Squadron Wing Commander Manzoor Hashmi shot down an IAF Su-7 with a Sidewinder missile over the village of Khalsapur. The squadron lost one Shenyang F-6 flown by Flight lieutenant Afzal Siddiqui who was accidentally shot down by Wing Commander Manzoor while they were chasing an Indian Su-7. He was posthumously awarded the Sitara-e-Basalat.

=== Designation as Air Superiority Squadron ===
After the war, the squadron was designated as an air superiority squadron in June 1975 and later deployed to the then newly activated Nawab Shah Base where it trained for air combat tactics with different kinds of aircraft.

=== Deployment at Masroor Base ===
After spending a week at Nawabshah, the squadron was deployed to PAF Base Masroor for live firing exercises, where it became the first squadron which received and successfully used the new SM-7 series gun-sights. During their time at Masroor, the squadron also participated in the "Exercise Gold Coin-II" where it performed low level air defence missions.

=== 1976 Inter-squadron competition ===
In late 1976, a batch of 5 pilots and 40 airmen from the No. 23 Squadron participated in the inter-squadron armament competition. The team scored the highest points which won them the Perry Keene trophy. Flight Lieutenant Azmat Kazi from the squadron achieved the highest score.

=== Air defence alert during the Soviet-Afghan war ===
During the Afghanistan conflict in the 1980s, the squadron was deployed at PAF Base Samungli where it was tasked with protecting the western borders of Pakistan with Afghanistan from Soviet and Afghan intrusions. A total of 376 Combat Air Patrol missions and 361 hot scrambles were reported. However, reports on aerial interceptions of soviet and afghan aircraft were not maintained.

=== Project-706 ===
In 1984, Pakistan obtained intelligence on a possible attack on its nuclear assets in Kahuta by India and Israel, as a result the Air Force was put on high alert and tasked to protect the Kahuta Research Laboratories. Thus a team of twelve pilots and ten aircraft from the No. 23 squadron was deployed for air defence missions at PAF Base Chaklala.

== Aircraft flown ==
No. 23 Squadron Talons
Role	Operational	Aircraft	Notes
Fighter/Bomber	1961-1964	Hawker Fury	Operated Fury fighters until they were retired from PAF service.
Air Superiority	1966–2002	Shenyang F-6P	
Fighter	2002–Present	Chengdu F-7PG	

== See also ==
- List of Pakistan Air Force squadrons
- No. 17 Squadron (Pakistan Air Force)
- 23rd Squadron (Iraq)
- No. 23 Squadron RNZAF
- No. 23 Squadron RAF
- No. 23 Squadron RAAF
