= Syed Manzoor ul Hassan Hashmi =

Pakistani Fighter Pilot

Wing Commander Syed Manzoor ul Hassan Hashmi SJ
- سید منظور الحسن ہاشمی
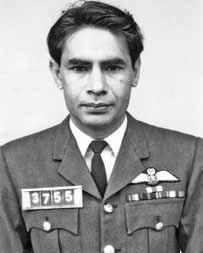
- Official portrait
- Born: 31 March 1936; Jhelum, Pakistan
- Died: 20 December 2000 (aged 64); Islamabad, Punjab, Pakistan
- Military career
- Branch: Pakistan Air Force
- Service years: 1954—1974
- Rank: Wing Commander
- Service number: 3755
- Units: No. 9 Squadron PAF; No. 11 Squadron PAF; No. 15 Squadron PAF; No. 23 Squadron PAF
- Conflicts: Indo-Pakistani War of 1965; Indo-Pakistani War of 1971
- Awards: See list

Syed Manzoor ul Hassan Hashmi (31 March 1936 – 20 December 2000) was squadron leader in the Pakistan Air Force. He served in the 1965 and 1971 wars. He was a recipient of the Sitara-e-Jurat.

== Career ==
Hashmi joined the RPAF College, Risalpur in October 1954. He completed his fighter training at Mauripur, he joined the No 15 squadron. He later served in the No 11 and No 9 squadrons as well.

Starting his career as Flight Lieutenant, Hashmi was awarded the Sitara-e-Jurat in 1965. His citation reads as follows: "Flight lieutenant Syed Manzoorul Hasan Hashmi flew 20 strike and 2 air defence missions against the enemy. His strikes were directed against enemy concentrations on Jummu, Sialkot, Wagha-Kasur sectors. He led his mission in a most competent manner and achieved considerable success against heavily defended enemy areas. His own aircraft was hit on six occasions by Ack Ack and small arms fire but, undaunted, he pursued his attacks on the enemy. His formation achieved notable success on 21 September 1965, in which he destroyed many heavy guns of the enemy which were shelling Lahore and earned him deep appreciation on own army's Area Commander. His cool, courageous and operational leadership in complete disregard to his own safety in the face of heavy enemy fire and devotion to duty are commendable. Hashmi is awarded Sitara-i-Juraat."

== Death ==
Hashmi died on 20 December 2000 due to a heart attack. He was laid to rest in his native town in Jhelum District.

== Gallery ==
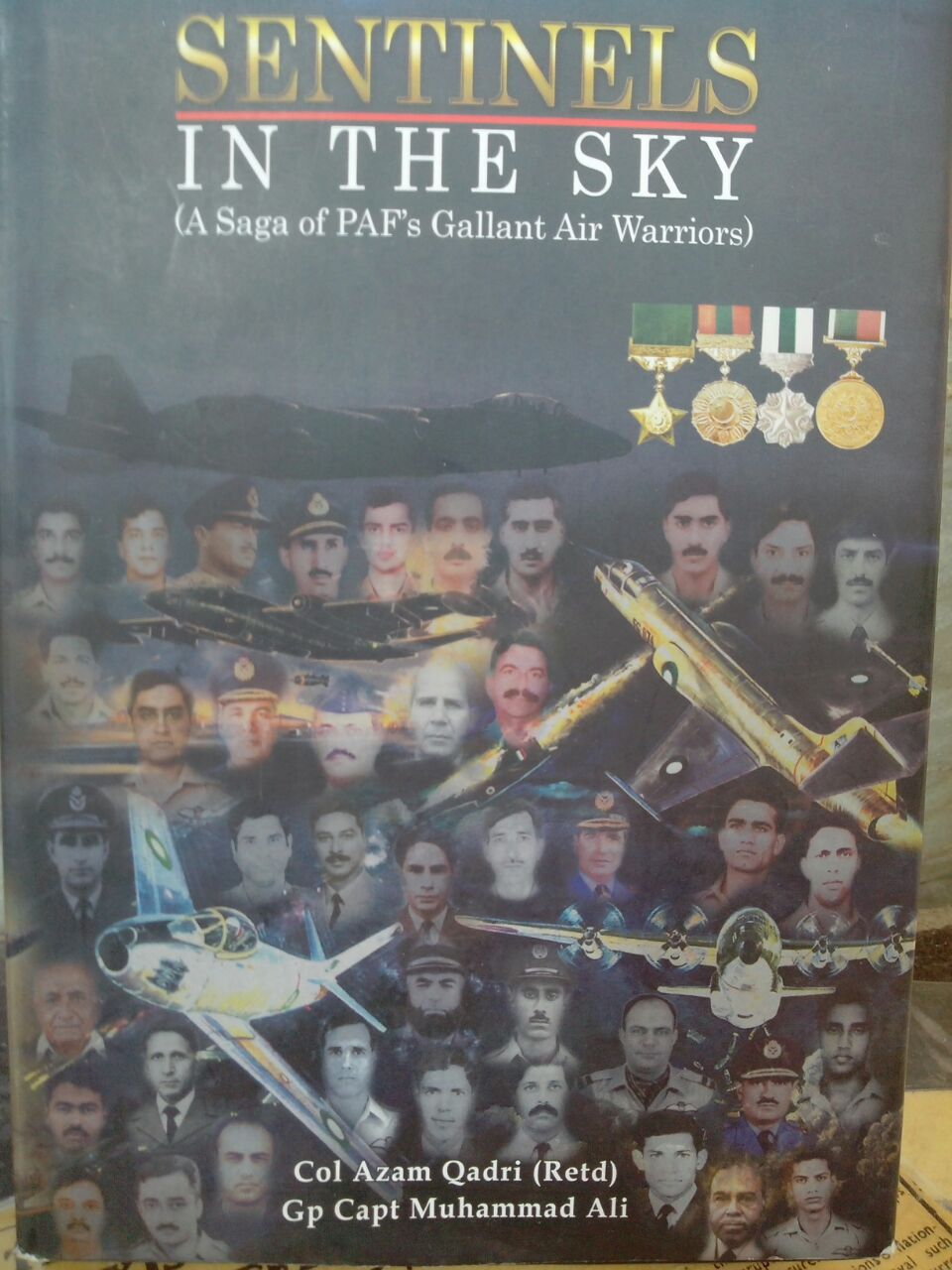
Sentinels in the Sky: A Saga of PAF's Gallant Air Warriors

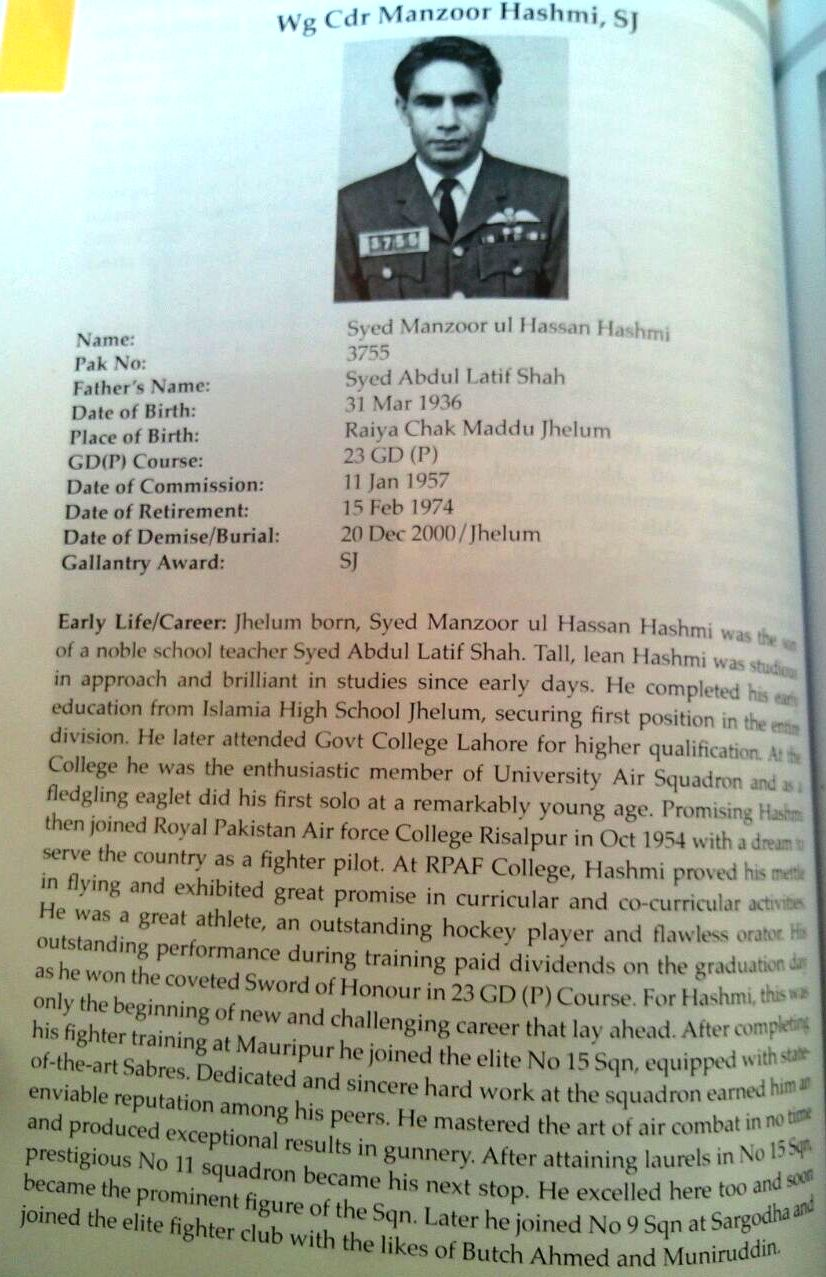
Sentinels in the Sky: A Saga of PAF's Gallant Air Warriors

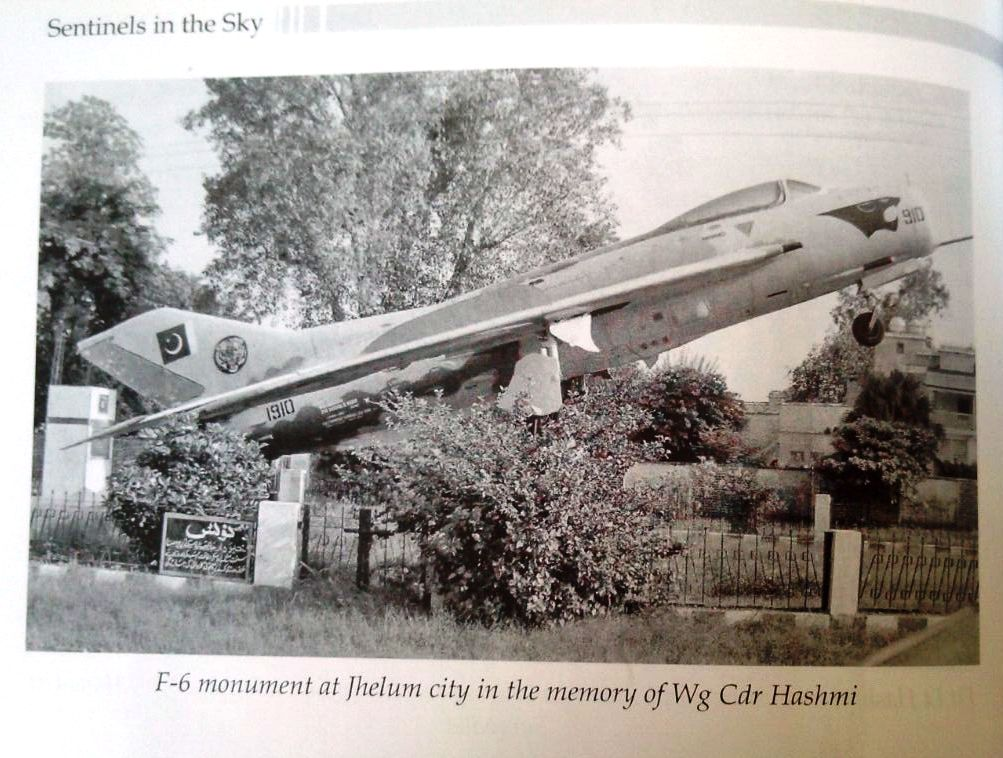
Sentinels in the Sky: A Saga of PAF's Gallant Air Warriors

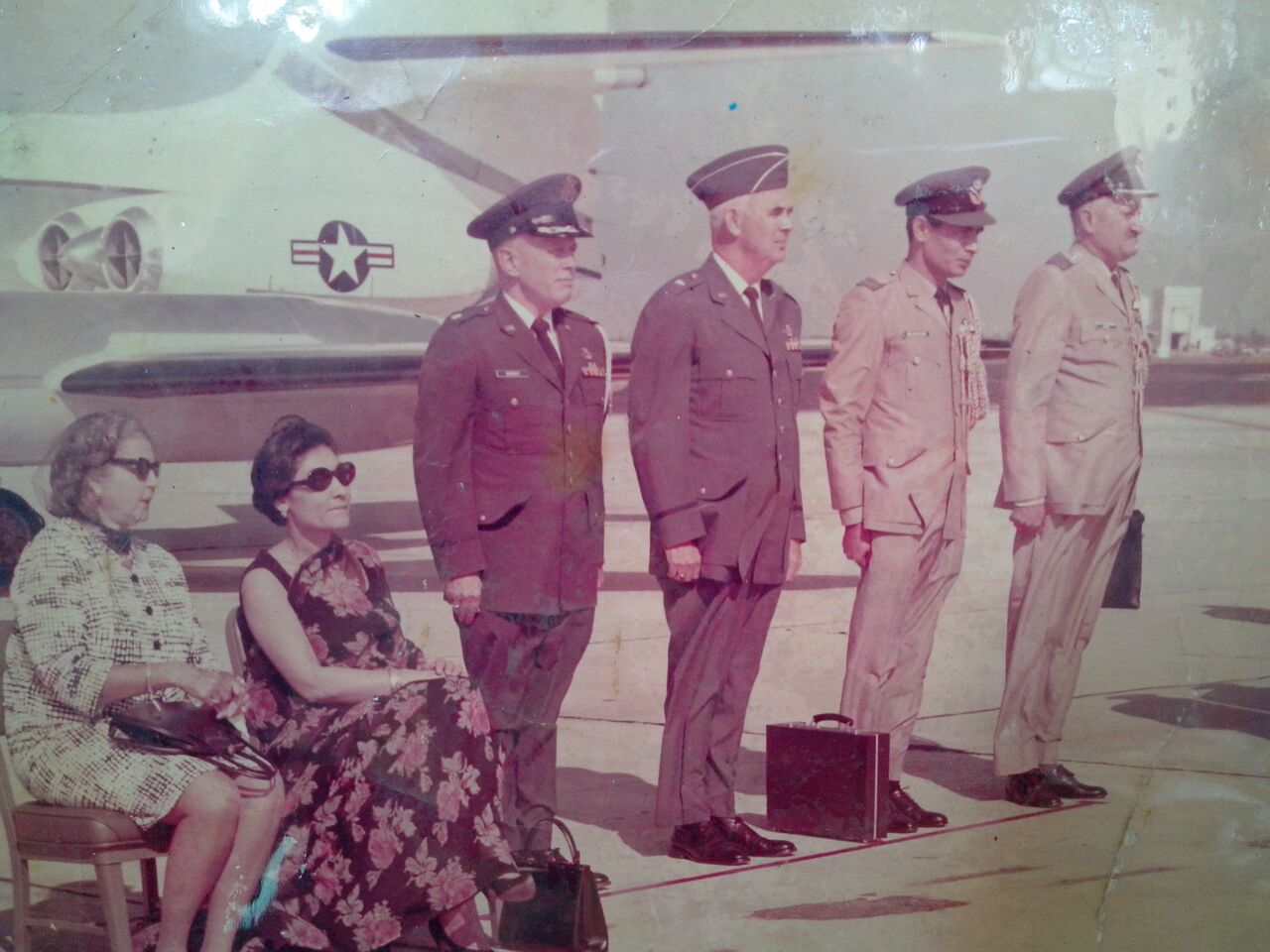
Sentinels in the Sky: A Saga of PAF's Gallant Air Warriors

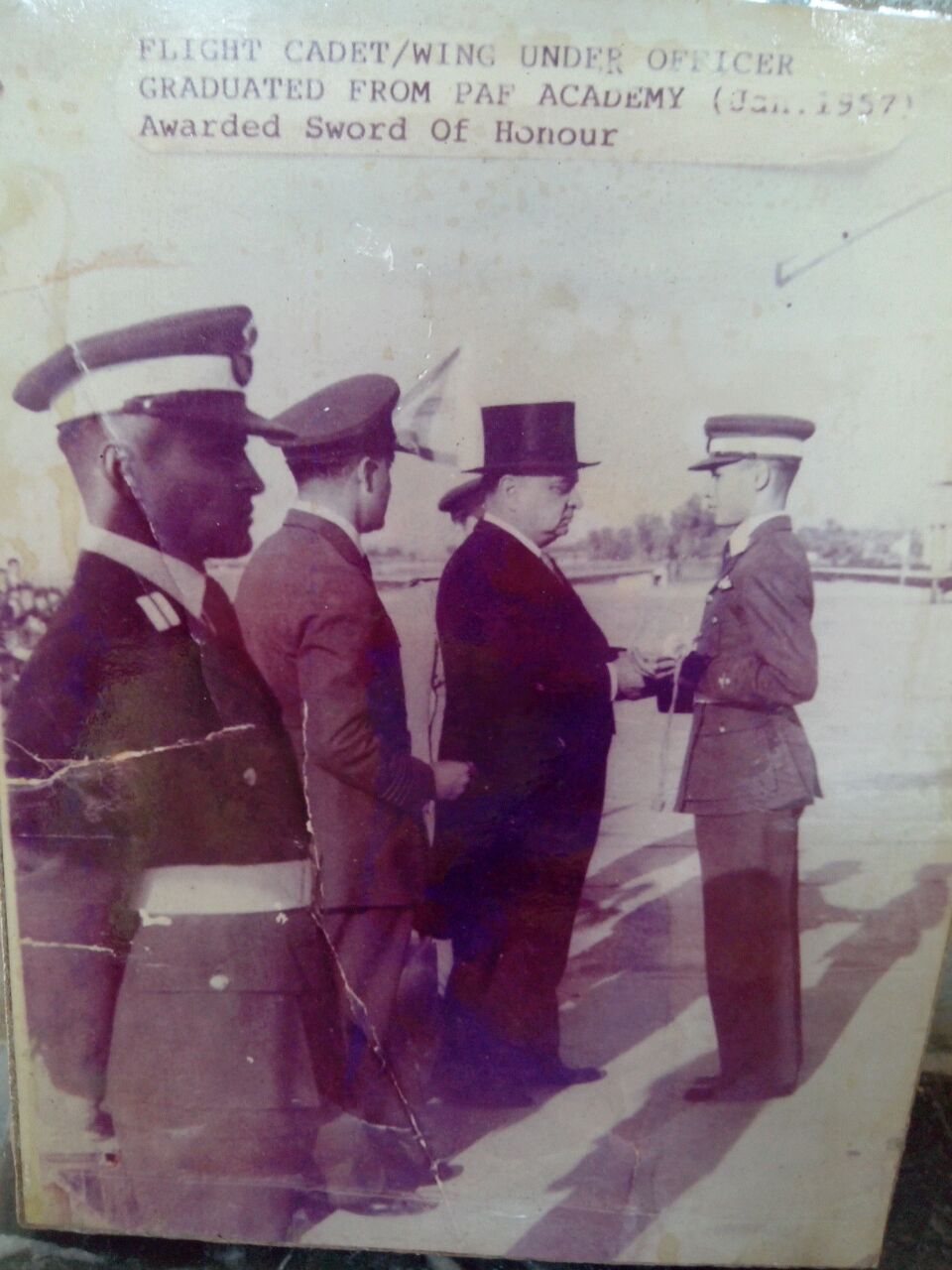
Sentinels in the Sky: A Saga of PAF's Gallant Air Warriors

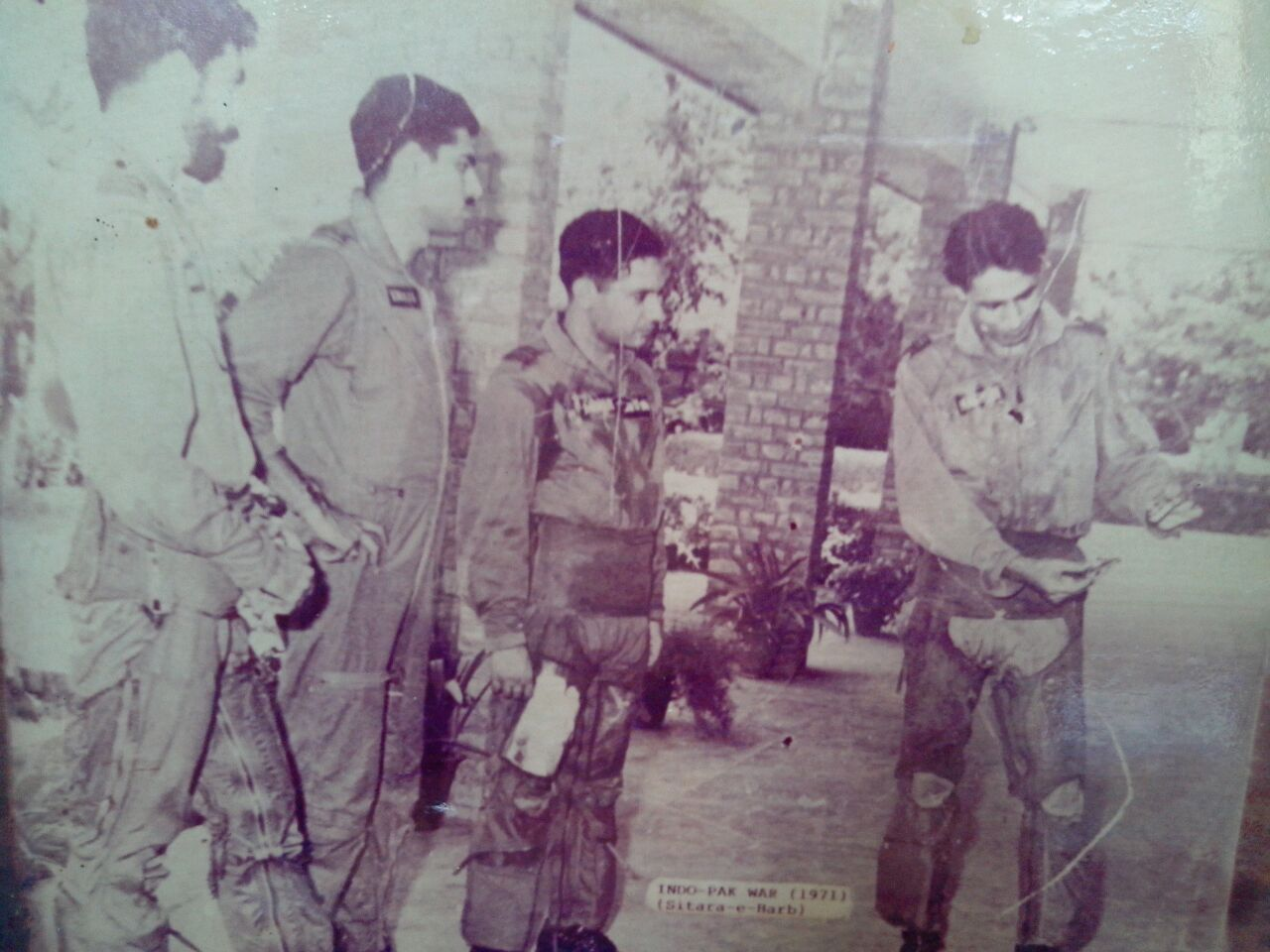
Sentinels in the Sky: A Saga of PAF's Gallant Air Warriors

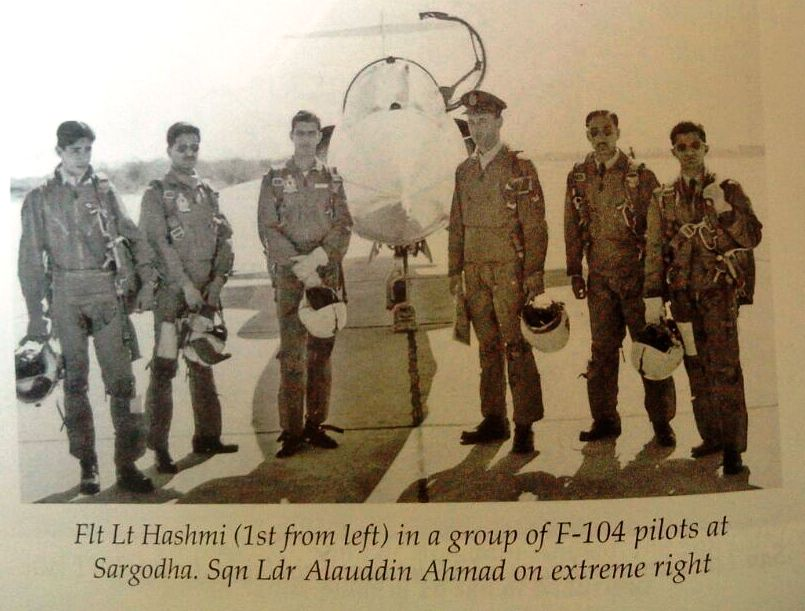
Sentinels in the Sky: A Saga of PAF's Gallant Air Warriors

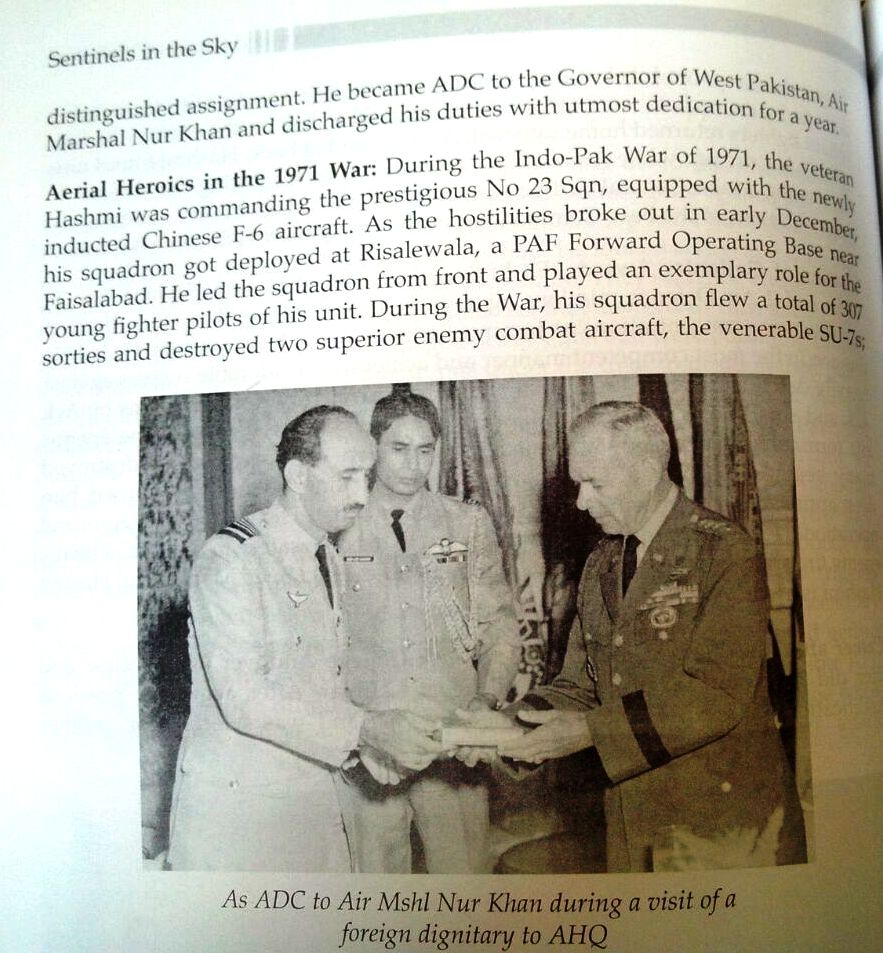
Sentinels in the Sky: A Saga of PAF's Gallant Air Warriors

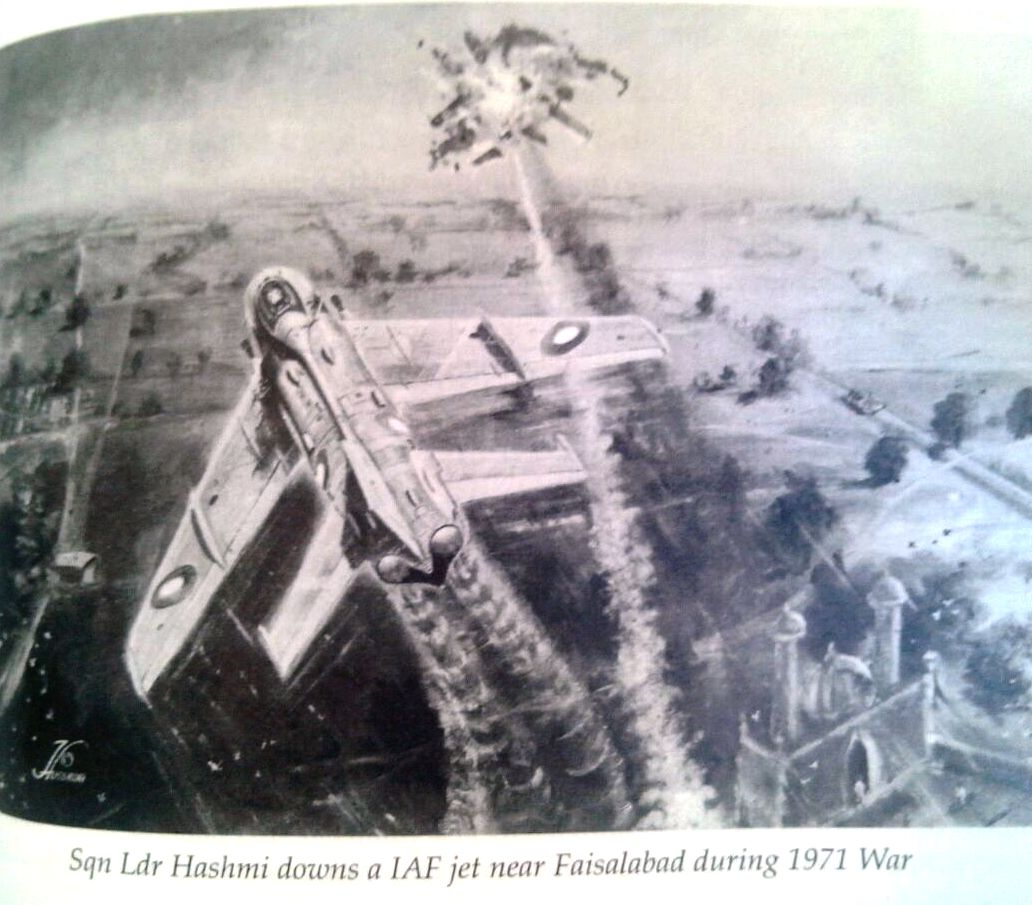
Sentinels in the Sky: A Saga of PAF's Gallant Air Warriors

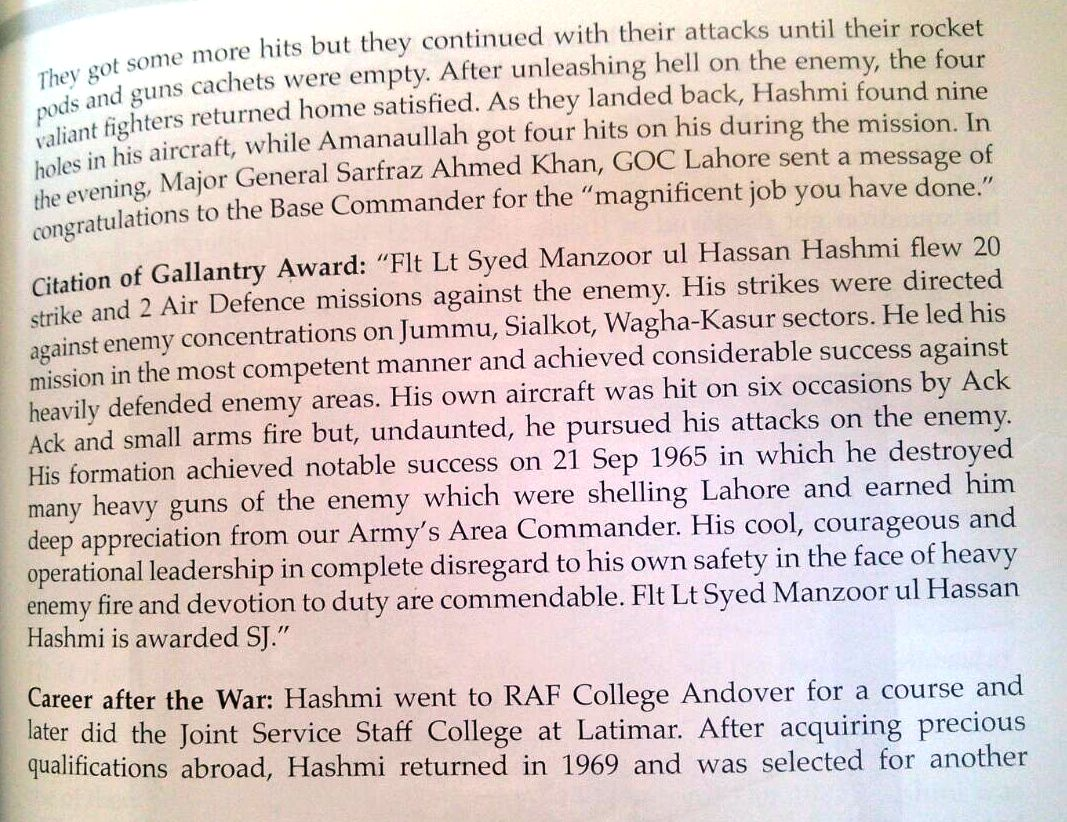
Sentinels in the Sky: A Saga of PAF's Gallant Air Warriors

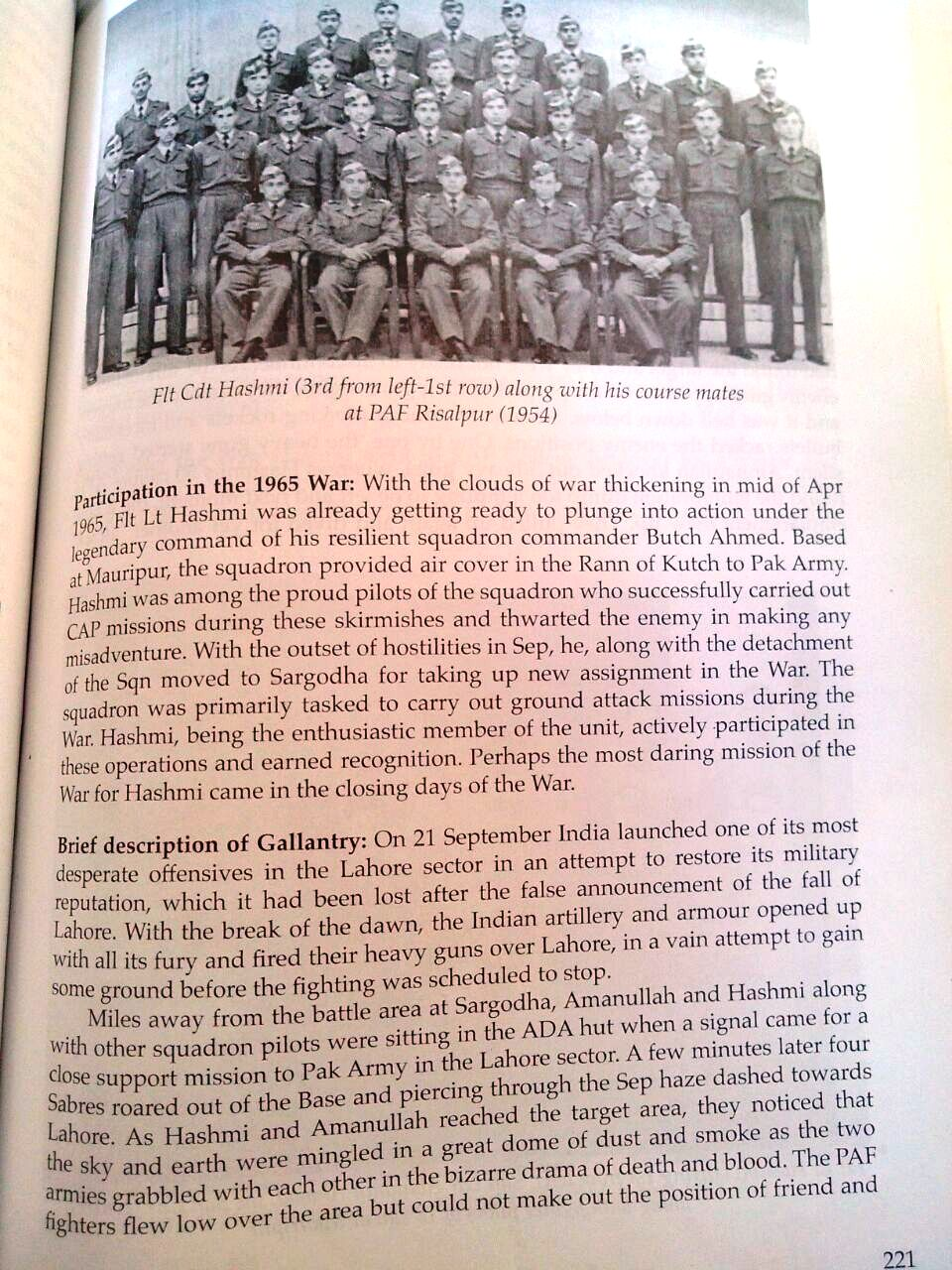
Sentinels in the Sky: A Saga of PAF's Gallant Air Warriors

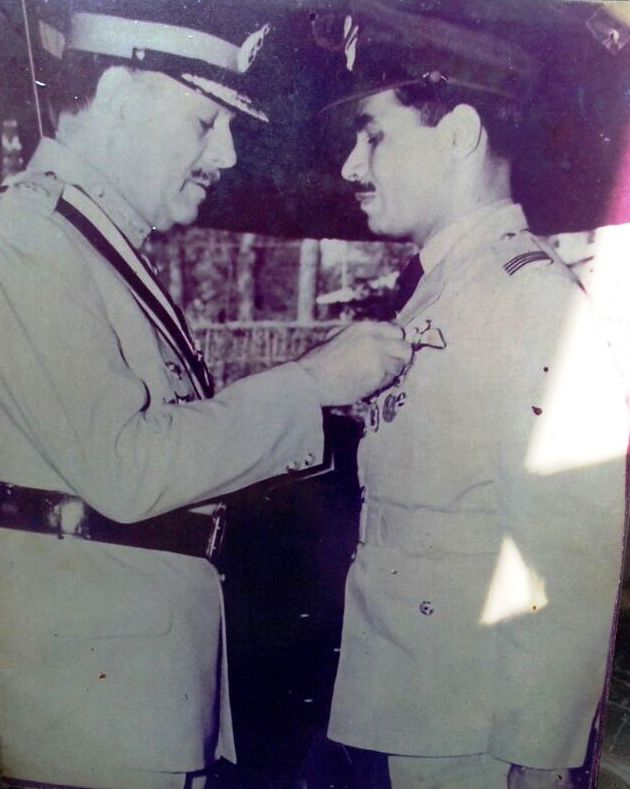
Sentinels in the Sky: A Saga of PAF's Gallant Air Warriors

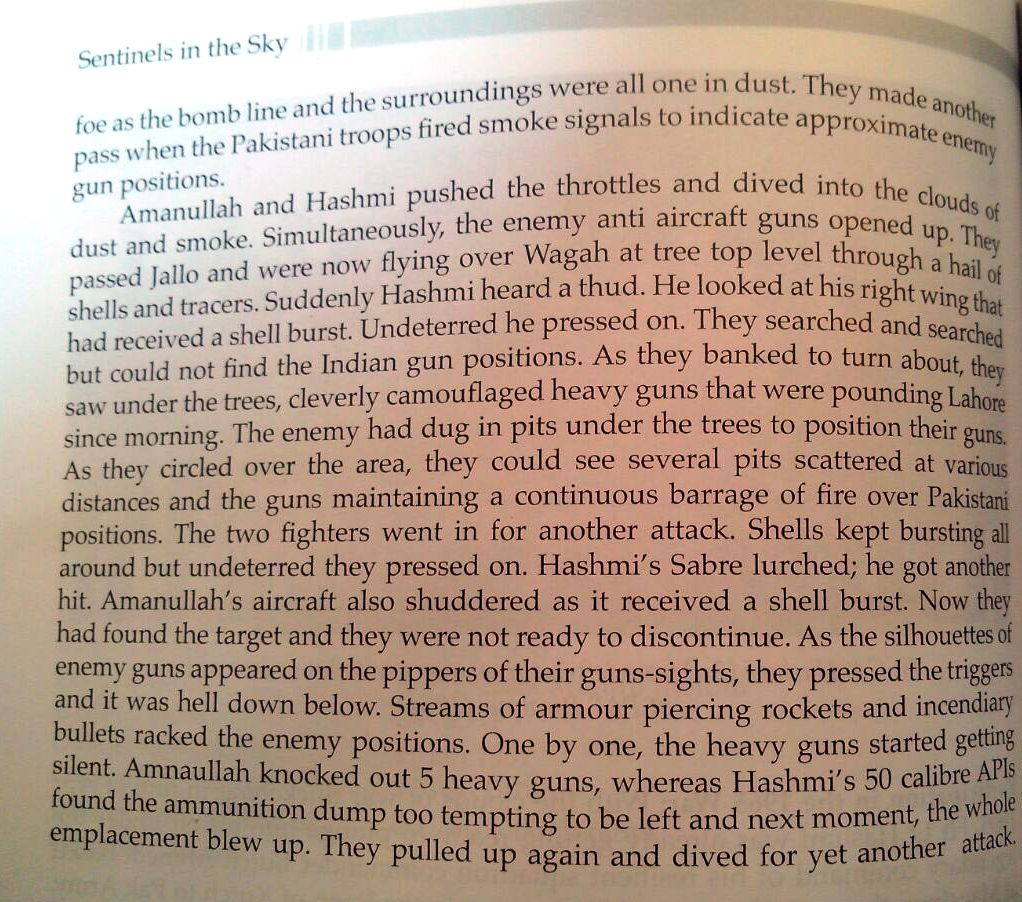
Sentinels in the Sky: A Saga of PAF's Gallant Air Warriors

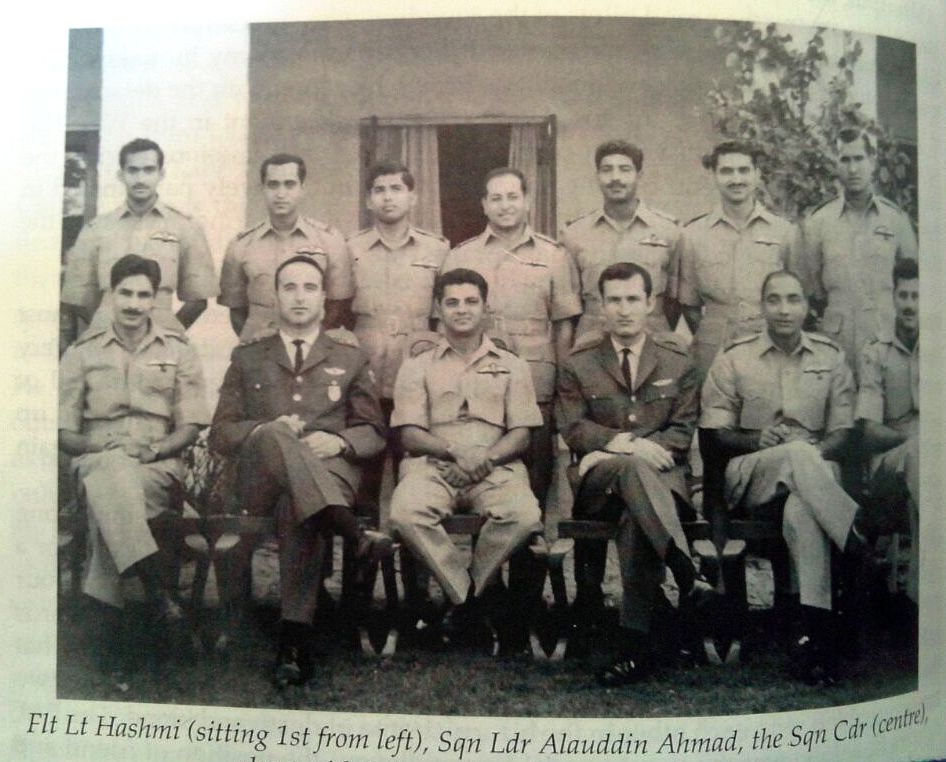
Sentinels in the Sky: A Saga of PAF's Gallant Air Warriors

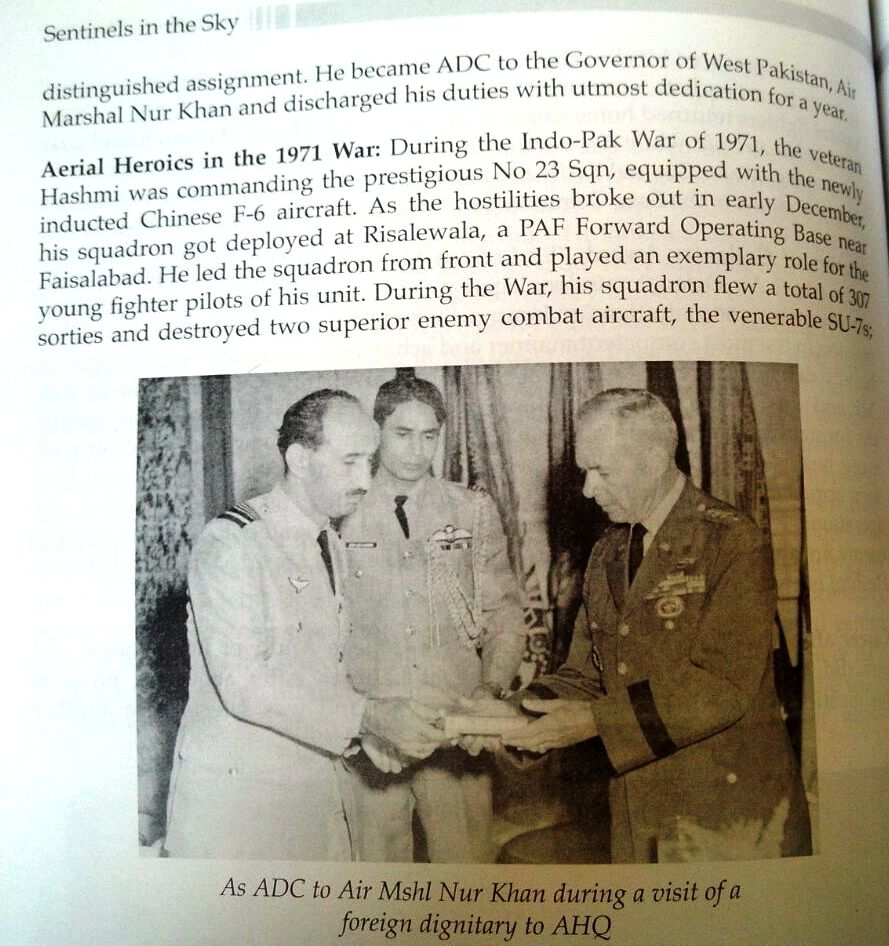
Sentinels in the Sky: A Saga of PAF's Gallant Air Warriors

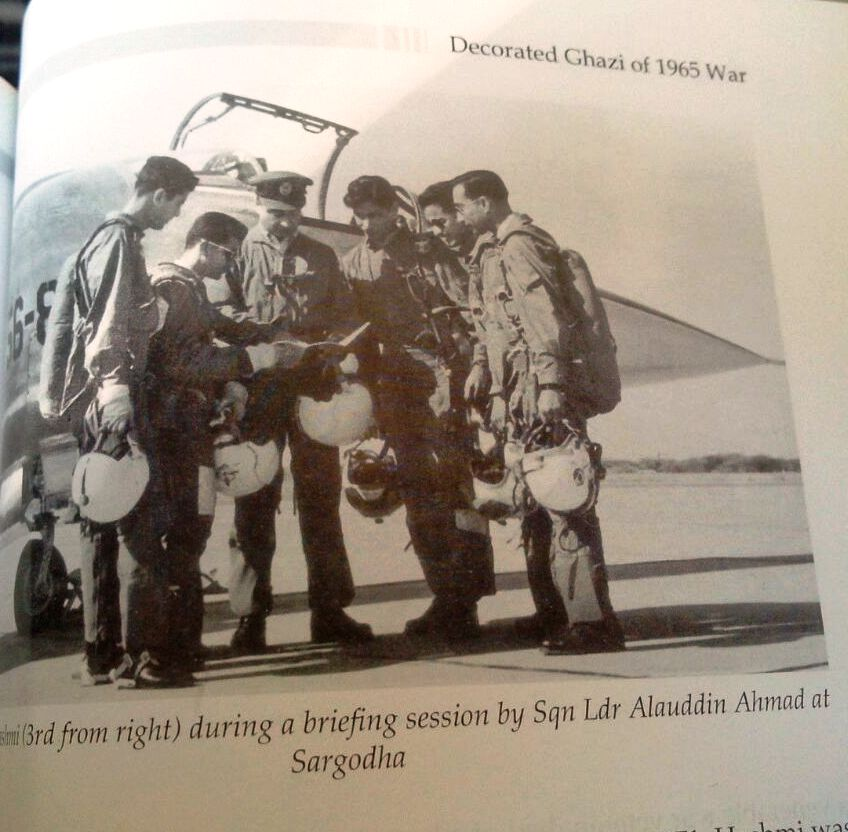
Sentinels in the Sky: A Saga of PAF's Gallant Air Warriors

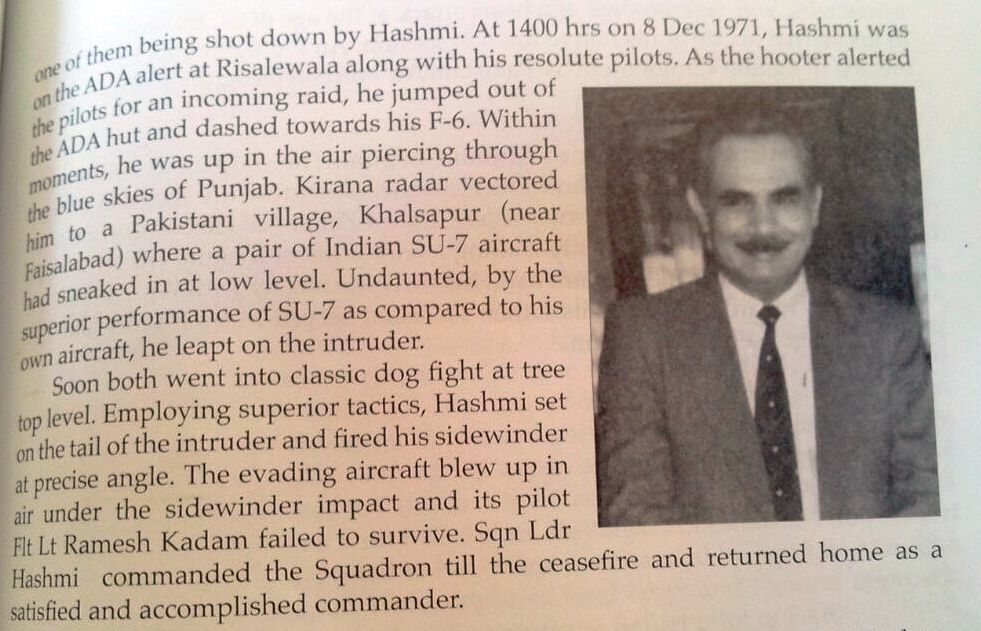
Sentinels in the Sky: A Saga of PAF's Gallant Air Warriors

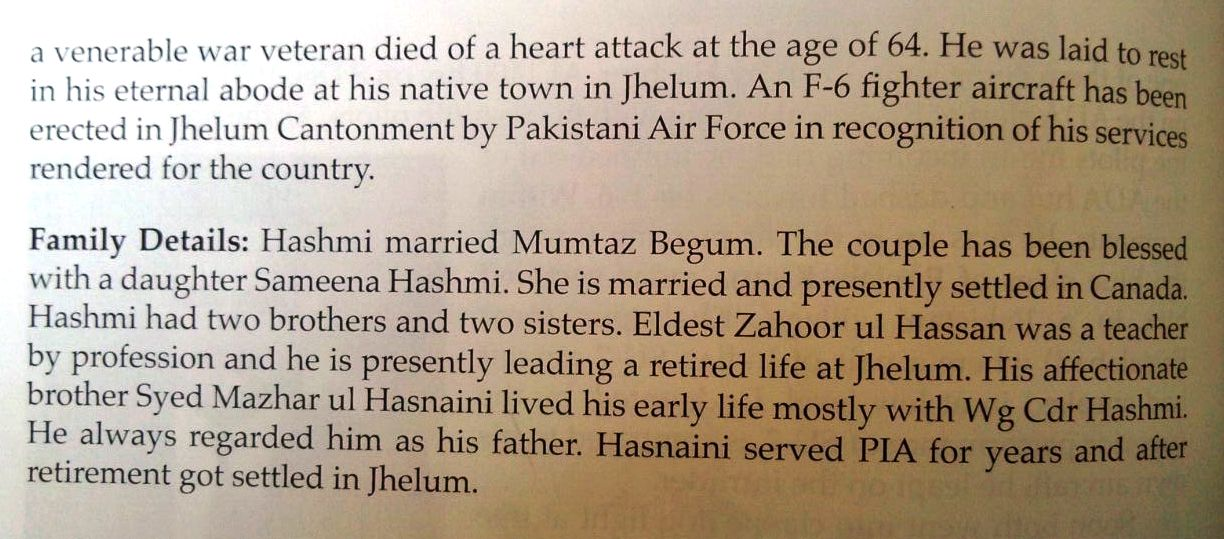
Sentinels in the Sky: A Saga of PAF's Gallant Air Warriors

== Awards and decorations ==
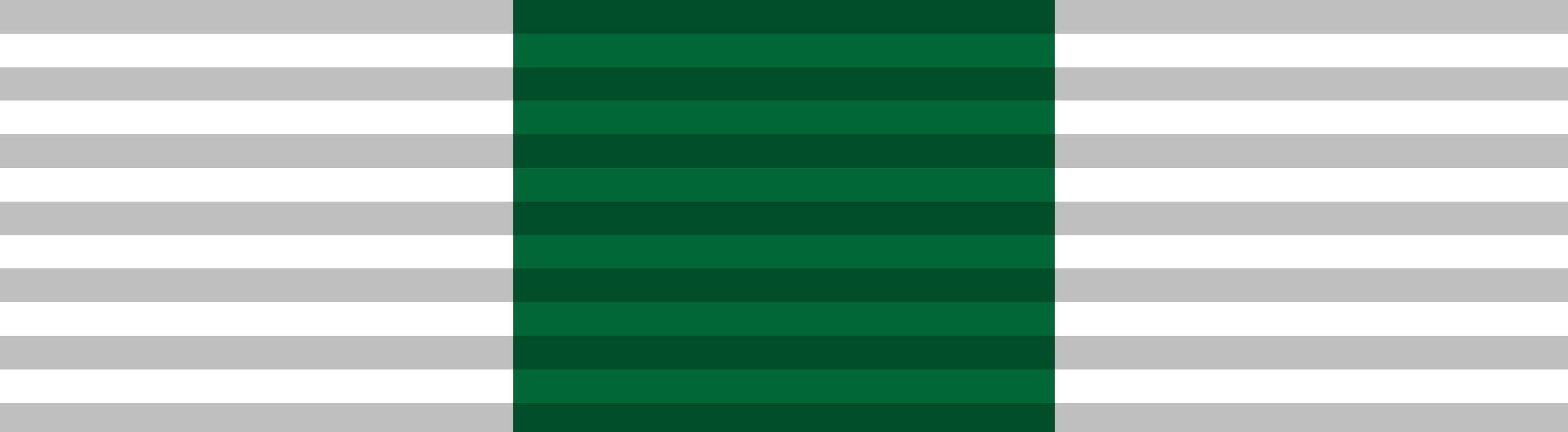

Sitara-e-Jurat (Star of Courage)	Tamgha-e-Diffa (Defence Medal)		Sitara-e-Harb 1965 War (War Star 1965)
Sitara-e-Harb 1971 War (War Star 1971)	Tamgha-e-Jang 1965 War (War Medal 1965)	Tamgha-e-Jang 1971 War (War Medal 1971)	Tamgha-e-Qayam-e-Jamhuria (Republic Commemoration Medal) 1956
