= LXXI Corps =

LXXI Corps or 71st Corps may refer to:

- LXXI Army Corps, Wehrmacht, Germany
- 71st (Liverpool Highlanders) Lancashire Rifle Volunteer Corps, United Kingdom

== See also ==
- List of military corps by number
- 71st Brigade (disambiguation)
- 71st Division (disambiguation)
- 71st Regiment (disambiguation)
- 71st (disambiguation)
