= J71 =

J71 may refer to:

- Allison J71, a turbojet engine
- LNER Class J71, a British steam locomotive class
- Triaugmented truncated dodecahedron

== See also ==
- Chengdu J-7 I "Fishcan", Chinese jet fighter plane series variant of the MiG-21
- 71 (disambiguation)
- J (disambiguation)
