= 71st =

71st is the ordinal form of the number 71. 71st or Seventy-first may also refer to:

- A fraction, 1/71, equal to one of 71 equal parts

== Geography ==
- 71st meridian east, a line of longitude
- 71st meridian west, a line of longitude
- 71st parallel north, a circle of latitude
- 71st parallel south, a circle of latitude

== Military ==
- 71st Group Army, People's Republic of China
- 71st Division (disambiguation)
- 71st Regiment (disambiguation)

== Other ==
- 71st century
- 71st century BC

== See also ==
- 71 (disambiguation)
