= P71 =

P71 may refer to

- Curtiss XP-71, an American fighter aircraft design
- Ford Crown Victoria Police Interceptor
- Maltese patrol boat P71
- Papyrus 71, a biblical manuscript

== See also ==
- Project 71 (disambiguation)
- 71 (disambiguation)
