= Project 71 =

Project 71 may refer to:

- Vikrant-class aircraft carrier, Indian indigenous aircraft carrier class, known as Project 71 Air Defence Ship
  - INS Vikrant (2013), (IAC-1), first Indian indigenous aircraft carrier, launched in 2013, known as ship of the Project 71 Air Defence Ship class
- Project 71(A) light aircraft carrier, a pre-WWII Soviet aircraft carrier design based on the Chapayev-class cruiser
- Project 71B large aircraft carrier, a WWII Soviet aircraft carrier design based on the Kronshtadt-class battlecruiser

== See also ==
- P71 (disambiguation)
- 71 (disambiguation)
