= 71st Infantry =

71st Infantry may refer to:

- 71st Infantry Regiment (Greece)
- 71st Infantry Regiment (New York)
- Highland Light Infantry, the 71st Foot
- 71st Infantry Division (France)
- 71st Infantry Division (United States)

== See also ==
- 71st Regiment (disambiguation)
