= 071 =

071 may refer to:

- Type 071 amphibious transport dock
- Type 071 icebreaker
- CIÉ 071 Class diesel locomotive

== See also ==
- 71 (disambiguation)
