= Tu Jida =

Chinese aircraft designer (1927–2011)

Tu Jida (Chinese: 屠基达; 11 December 1927 – 16 February 2011) was a Chinese aircraft designer who led the development of five models of aircraft and was hailed as the "father of the Chengdu J-7" family of jet fighters. In the 1950s, he participated in the development of the Shenyang JJ-1 trainer and was a chief designer of the Nanchang CJ-6 trainer. Starting in 1960, as chief designer of the Chengdu Aircraft Factory, he developed the fighter jets Shenyang J-5A, Chengdu JJ-5, and several variants of the J-7 fighter, including the Chengdu J-7M, then China's only warplane competitive in the world market. He was an academician of the Chinese Academy of Engineering.

== Early life and education ==
Tu Jida was born 11 December 1927 in Shaoxing, Zhejiang, Republic of China. When he was ten, the Second Sino-Japanese War broke out and Shaoxing was bombed by Japanese warplanes. To seek refuge from the war, his mother brought him and his brother to live in the Shanghai International Settlement. This experience greatly influenced Tu's decision to become an aircraft designer. After the end of the war, he was admitted to the aeronautical engineering department of Shanghai Jiao Tong University in 1946.

== Career ==
After graduating from university in 1951, Tu was assigned to work for the Harbin Aircraft Factory. In 1956, he was transferred to the Shenyang Aircraft Factory to help develop the Shenyang JJ-1 trainer, the first jet aircraft designed in China. Working under chief designer Xu Shunshou and deputy chief Huang Zhiqian, Tu was in charge of designing the fuselage. The plane took its first flight in July 1958, after only 21 months of development.

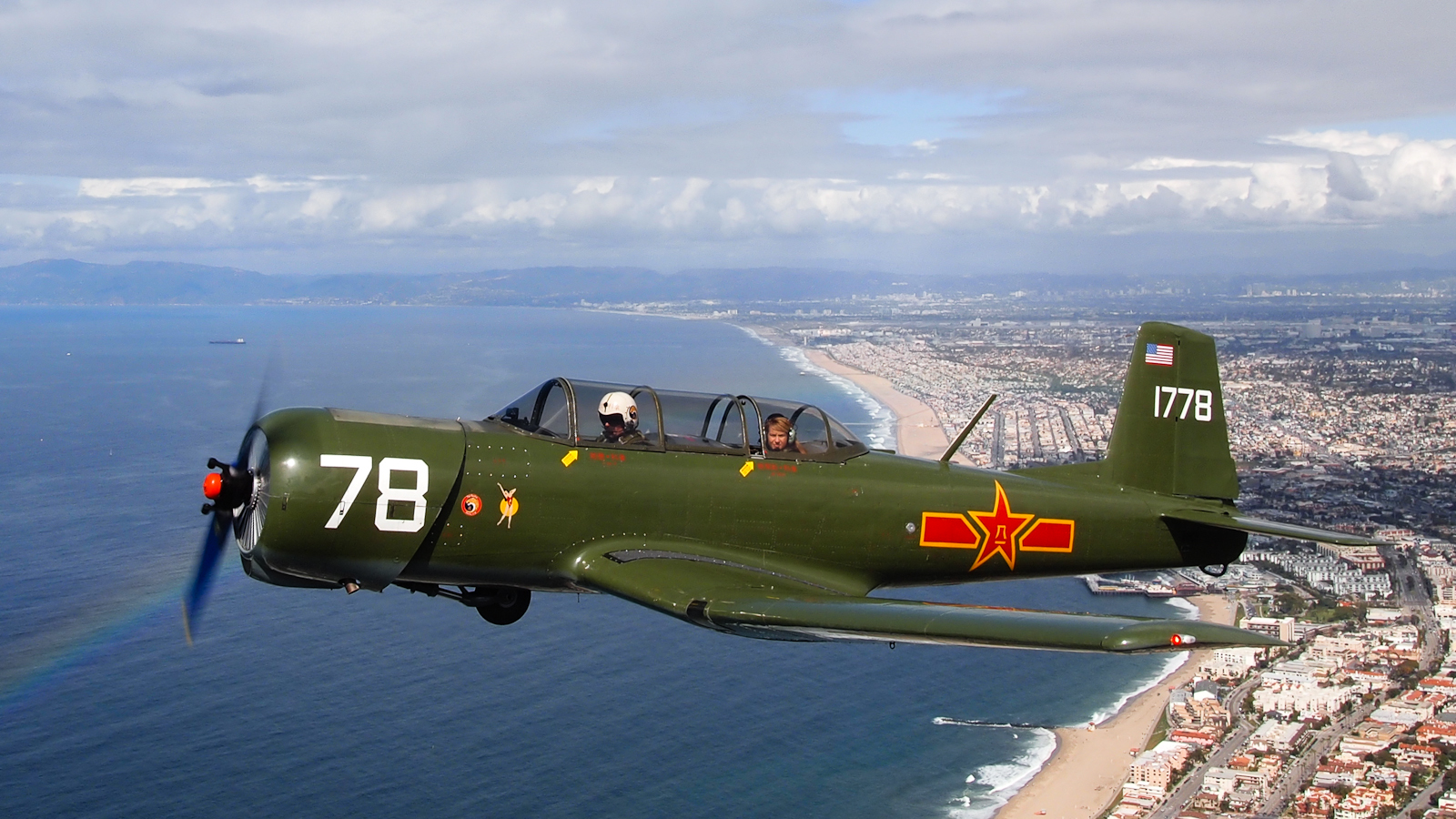
Nanchang CJ-6A basic trainer

In 1958, Tu Jida and Lin Jiahua were tasked with designing the Nanchang CJ-6 basic trainer at the Nanchang Aircraft Factory. It took their team only 72 days to build a working prototype. After further development, in the 1980s it became the first Chinese-designed aircraft to be mass produced, with more than 2,000 made.

In 1960, Tu was transferred to Chengdu to work for the Chengdu Aircraft Factory, then still being established. He served as chief designer for the Shenyang J-5A, an improved version of the J-5 fighter. The J-5A took its maiden flight on 11 November 1964. It was the first plane built by Chengdu Aircraft. Based on the J-5A, Tu went on to design the jet trainer Chengdu JJ-5. The plane was in production for 20 years, with more than 1,000 manufactured in total. It was the main trainer used in Chinese aviation schools, and more than 15,000 pilots received their training in the aircraft. It was also exported to more than ten countries.

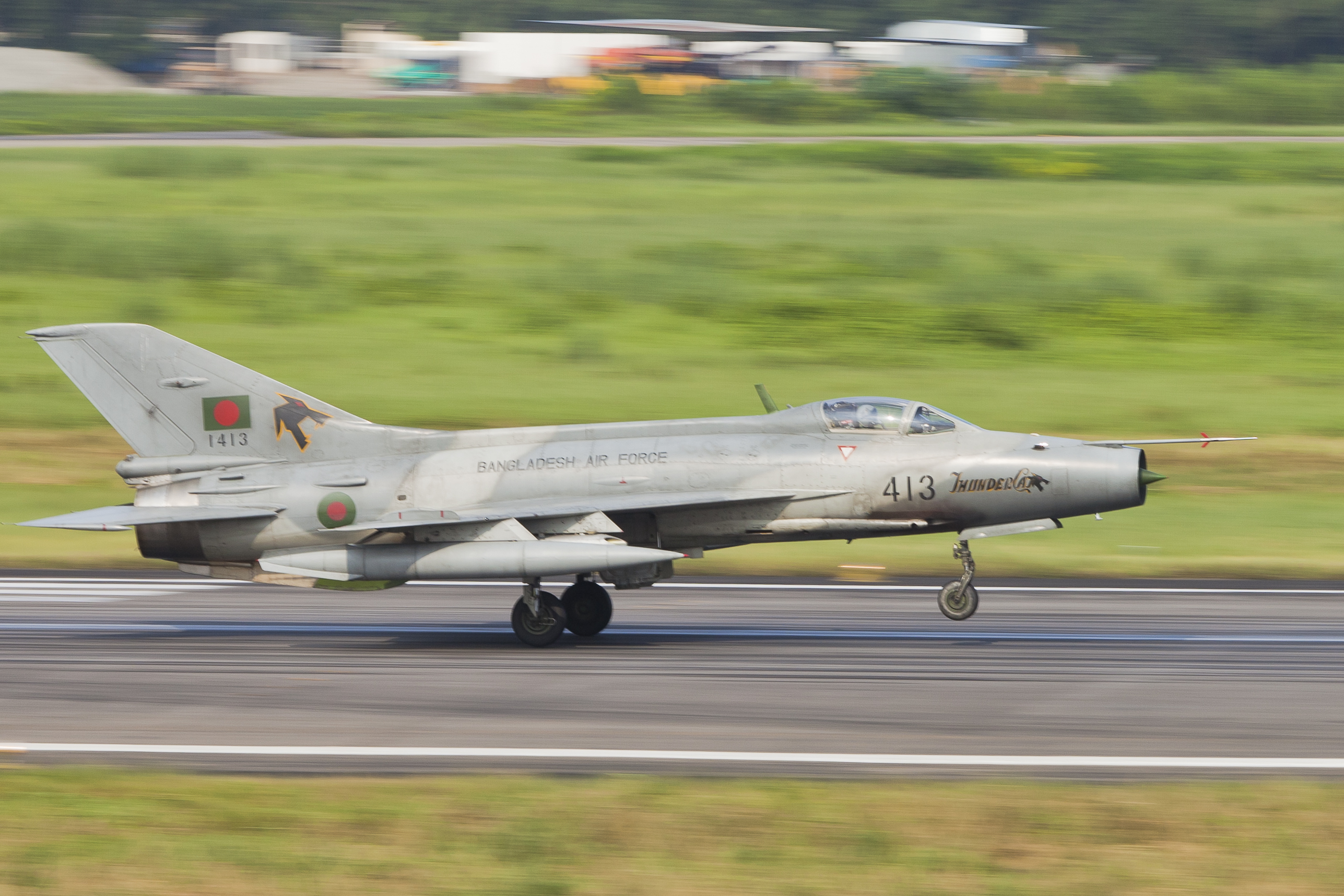
A Bangladesh Air Force F-7MB fighter

In 1969, Chengdu Aircraft took over the development of the J-7 fighter (also known as F-7) from Shenyang Aircraft, and Tu was again the chief designer. He developed the J-7I model in 1973, and then the J7-II with a greatly improved ejection seat system. In 1987, he developed the J-7M, which was exported to many countries. It was the only Chinese-made warplane that was competitive in the world market, and Tu was hailed as the "father of J-7" in official Chinese media. He was also a professor and doctoral advisor at the Nanjing University of Aeronautics and Astronautics.

Tu was awarded the State Science and Technology Progress Award (First Class) in 1985. In 1995, he was elected an academician of the Chinese Academy of Engineering.

== Personal life ==
Tu had a son, Tu Zhengxing (屠征星), and a daughter, Tu Zhengyin (屠征音). According to his children, he devoted most of his time to work and spent little time with his family.

Tu worked at the Chengdu Aircraft Industry Group until the end of his life. In the Chinese New Year of 2011, he went to Shenzhen to spend the holiday with his family. He had a fall when in Shenzhen, and died on 16 February at the Shenzhen No. 6 People's Hospital, at the age of 83.
