= 70th United States Colored Infantry Regiment =

- Flag of the United States (1865–1867)
- Active: between April 23 and October 1, 1864 - March 7, 1866
- Country: United States
- Allegiance: Union
- Branch: United States Colored Troops; Infantry
- Role: Post and garrison duties
- Engagements: Expedition to Vidalia, Louisiana

The 70th United States Colored Infantry Regiment was an infantry regiment of African-American troops recruited from Mississippi that served with the United States Colored Troops during the American Civil War.

== Organization ==
The regiment was organized at Natchez, Mississippi, between April 23 and October 1, 1864. Its initial formation consisted of just four companies. On September 21, 1864, the 71st United States Colored Infantry Regiment was merged into the 70th Regiment, completing the unit's organization.

== Service ==
US Colored Troops were assigned to garrison duties to hold strategic points along the Mississippi River and free up veteran Union regiments for service elsewhere. General Henry Halleck wrote to Ulysses S. Grant in July 1863 expressing his opinion that the regiments of freshly-recruited Black troops would be suitable for this assignment: "The Mississippi should be the base of future operations east and west. When Port Hudson falls, the fortifications of that place, as well as of Vicksburg, should be so arranged as to be held by the smallest possible garrisons, thus leaving the mass of troops for operations in the field. I suggest that colored troops be used as far as possible in the garrisons."

The regiment primarily performed post and garrison duties at Natchez, Rodney and other various points throughout the state, until March, 1866. The 70th regiment was occasionally sent on scouting parties to "break up the gangs of thieves and jayhawkers..and to prevent the crossing of the river by parties of the enemy", and was commended for assisting in an August, 1864 expedition by Union troops to Vidalia, Louisiana.

The regiment was mustered out of service on March 7, 1866.

== Commanding officers ==
Commanding officers of the 70th USCT Infantry Regiment:

- Colonel Willard C. Earle, resigned October 1865.
- Lieutenant Colonel Morris Yeomans
- Lieutenant Colonel Charles B. Leavitt, transferred to 12th USCT Artillery, November 1864.

== See also ==
- List of United States Colored Troops units in the American Civil War
