= 71st Brigade =

71st Brigade may refer to:

== British India ==
- 71st Indian Infantry Brigade

== Greece ==
- 71st Airmobile Brigade (Greece)

== Japan ==
- 71st Independent Mixed Brigade

== Spain ==
- 71st Mixed Brigade

== Ukraine ==
- 71st Airmobile Brigade (Ukraine)

== United Kingdom ==
- 71st Infantry Brigade (United Kingdom)

== United States ==
- 71st Airborne Brigade (United States)
- 71st Expeditionary Military Intelligence Brigade

== See also ==
- 71st Division (disambiguation)
- 71st Regiment (disambiguation)
