= Project Sabre II =

Pakistani fighter project

F-7S Sabre II
- Schematics of F-7S Sabre II

General information
- Type: Multi-role combat aircraft
- Manufacturer: Pakistan Aeronautical Complex
- Designer: Pakistan Aeronautical Complex; Chengdu Aircraft Corporation; Grumman
- Status: Cancelled
- Primary user: Pakistan Air Force (PAF)

History
- Introduction date: 1987
- Developed from: Chengdu F-7M

External images
- Models of the Sabre II, in PAF markings, and the Chengdu F-7 published in September 1987.
- The F-7 Sabre II and the Super 7.

Project Sabre II was the Pakistan Air Force's program to develop a feasible and low-cost multirole combat jet based on an existing design—the Chengdu F-7 Skybolt, a Chinese variant of the MiG-21. The Pakistan Air Force (PAF) initiated Project Sabre II in 1987, hiring the American aerospace firm Grumman, to provide crucial expertise to refine the baseline aircraft design along with specialists from the PAF and the Chinese People's Liberation Army Air Force (PLAAF).

After studying the Sabre II concept with Grumman, the PAF terminated the program as unfeasible on economic grounds. Grumman withdrew from the project after sanctions were imposed by the United States on China after Beijing's suppression of the Tiananmen Square protests of 1989. An embargo on military aid to Pakistan imposed by the United States further hampered the Sabre II development effort in the 1990s. In 1995, Pakistan and China began a collaboration which led to the successful JF-17 Thunder program.

== Program overview ==
=== Origins ===
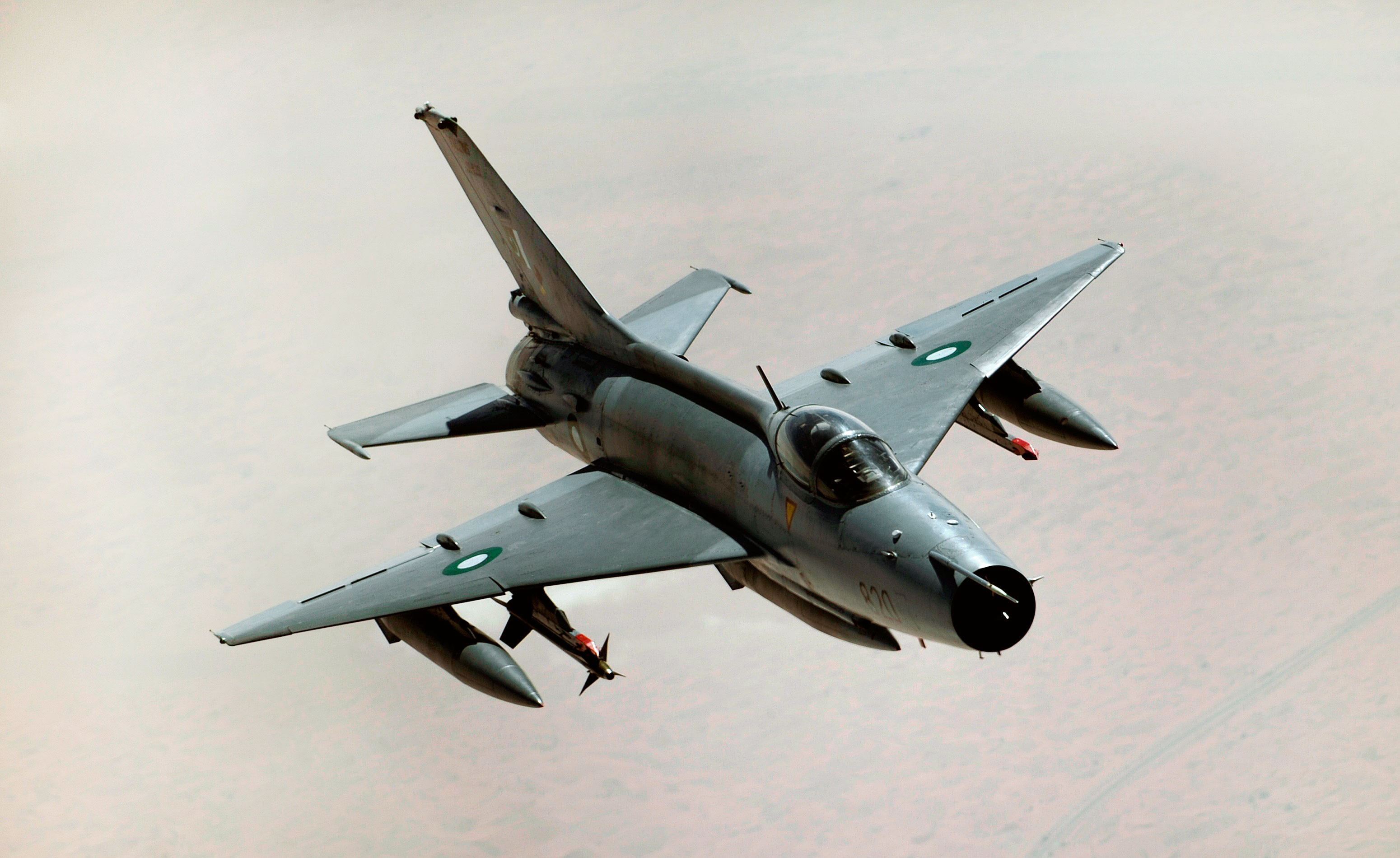
A Pakistan Air Force Chengdu F-7PG.

In 1982, the Indian Air Force (IAF) procured the MiG-29 Fulcrum from the Soviet Union to modernize its fighter aircraft fleet. As a result, the Pakistan Air Force (PAF) began looking for new technology to replace its aging fighters. By 1984, the PAF's F-7P (Chengdu F-7) fighters were equipped with western electronic systems. The PAF began developing an improved version of the F-7M to replace its large fleet of F-6 fighters.

The Pakistan Air Force started looking for a new fighter to replace their large fleet of Shenyang F-6 fighters, as they approached the end of their service lives in the late 1980s. After showing interest in the F-7M, the Air HQ of the Pakistan Air Force initiated Project Sabre–II to the develop a low-cost multirole fighter jet on the model of the F-7M.

=== Design feasibility ===
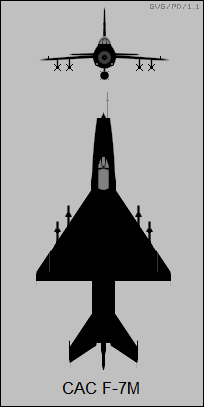
A schematics of PAF's F-7M, of which its design was studied.

In January 1987, the Pakistan Air Force commissioned New York-based Grumman Aerospace to conduct studies and assess the feasibility of the Sabre II design concept with Pakistani aerial specialists and the Chinese Chengdu Aircraft corporation. After five to seven months, the group concluded that the financial risks caused by very high project costs, and the availability of more cost-effective options outweighed the potential benefits from technology transfer from the US to the Pakistan Aeronautical Complex, increasing its experience and technical knowledge.

Grumman, the Pakistan Air Force and the Chinese People's Liberation Army Air Force (PLAAF) created the Sabre II concept by radically upgrading the F-7M. Changes included upgrades to its avionics suite, radar system and engine, and a redesigned forward fuselage. The PAF stated that the Sabre II would replace around 150 F-6s in combat service. A picture showed that the F-7's nose inlet had been replaced with a solid nose radome and a new pair of air inlets were mounted on the sides of the fuselage under the cockpit.

Under Project Sabre II and the Chinese Super-7 project, the F-7 airframe was redesigned with angled air intakes on the sides of the fuselage so a solid radome nose could house radar and other avionics from Northrop's F-20 "Tigershark" fighter. The Chinese WP-7 turbojet engine was to be replaced with a modern turbofan engine, either the GE F404 or PW1120, to improve performance. The resulting aircraft, designated F-7M Sabre-II, would have looked much like the Guizhou JL-9 (or FTC-2000) jet trainer / fighter aircraft.

Pratt & Whitney's PW1216, an afterburning derivative of the J52-P-409 turbojet producing 16,000 pounds-force (71 kN) of thrust, was also proposed as the Sabre II's engine. Its afterburner was designed in China. Fitting the APG-66 radar was also planned.

=== U.S. objections and termination ===
As the Soviet Union was withdrawing from neighboring Afghanistan, American interest in Pakistan lessened. The PAF terminated the Sabre II project after Grumman's warning that it was financially risky and less feasible than other options. Worsening of the US–Chinese relations after Beijing's suppression of the Tiananmen Square student protests also hurt the project, as U.S. sanctions prevented transfer of American technology to China. Grumman Aerospace withdrew from the project shortly thereafter.

At the same time, the US Congress imposed an embargo on economic and military exports to Pakistan when Congressional leaders became aware of Pakistan's atomic bomb program. A panic ensued among the Pakistani military, as its nuclear bomb program impacted the Super-7 project. The US government tolerated Pakistan's nuclear program during the 1980s due to a desire for the country's cooperation in defeating the USSR in the Soviet–Afghan War. Once the Soviet forces retreated, Pakistani cooperation was no longer required and military and economic sanctions were imposed on Pakistan under the Pressler amendment in 1990. This prevented F-16 aircraft already paid for by the PAF during the Afghan war from being delivered. Efforts by the PAF to find a replacement failed (see Pakistan Air Force#1990–2001: U.S. arms embargo).

=== Super 7: Evolution into JF-17 ===
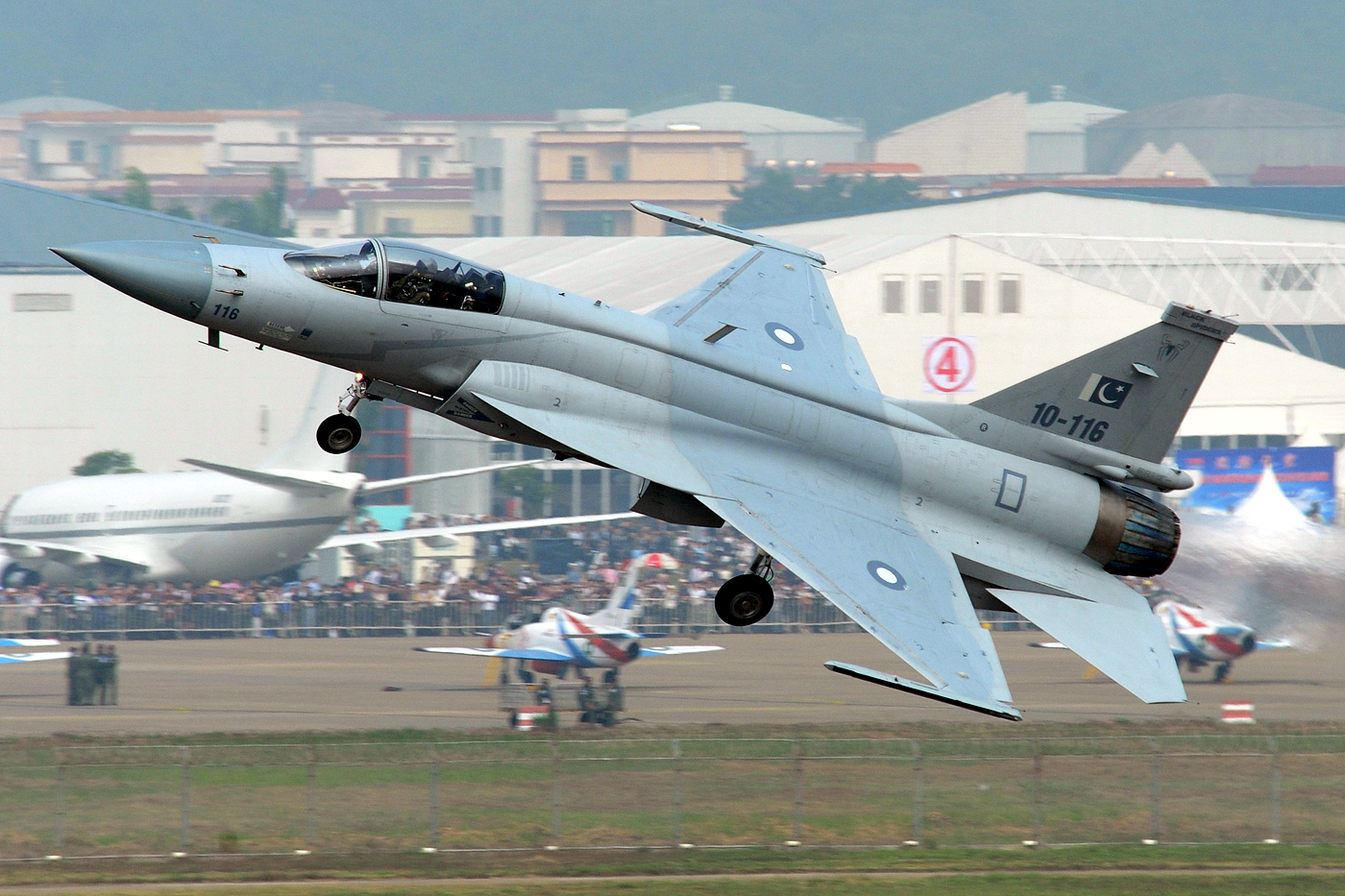
The Sabre-II evolved into the successful development of the JF-17 Thunder, in 2003.

The Pakistan Air Force decided on a much less expensive solution for replacement of the F-6, the F-7P Skybolt, an upgraded version of the F-7M Airguard. The F-7P fleet was to be supported by a fleet of over 100 advanced F-16s from the United States, 40 of which had been delivered during the 1980s. The PAF launched a secretive project, ROSE, to procure as many second-hand Dassault Mirages as possible and upgrade their electronic systems. In March 1990 it was reported that after being rejected by the PAF, Sabre II had been superseded by the Super 7 and China was considering continuing its development. The American arms embargo had forced the PAF to come up with innovative solutions to keep all its combat infrastructure operational.

The PAF hired Russia's Mikoyan Group as consultants, and design studies for the project began at the Pakistan Aeronautical Complex. In 1995, the Pakistan Air Force decided to resume the program and quickly reached out to China. Memoranda of Understanding were reached between both countries towards developing new aircraft to fill the role of the Super 7. This led to the successful development of the JF-17 Thunder, introduced in 2003.
