= List of Chengdu J-7 variants =

The following is a list of variants and specifications for variants of the Chengdu J-7, which differed considerably between models in its 48-year production run. Production of the J-7 ceased after delivering 16 F-7BGIs to the Bangladesh Air Force in 2013.

== Development ==
Production of the J-7 lasted nearly half a century, beginning in November 1964 when Shenyang Aircraft Factory (SAC) started components manufacturing for aircraft, and eventually ended in May 2013. State certification of the first J-7 for series production was received on December 28, 1966, after the Cultural Revolution started. As a result of the political turmoil, early production J-7s suffered from quality issues that persisted into the 1980s, long after the end of the Cultural Revolution. More than 2,400 have been built in the many different models listed below.

== Type 1962/62 series ==
Due to the Sino-Soviet split, Soviet-built MiG-21s were not used in China, and the few that were imported beforehand were referred to as Type 1962. Designation Type 62 was subsequently used to refer to MiG-21F-13s assembled in China under license from Soviet-supplied kits.

- Type 1962: 12 imported MiG-21F-13 delivered and entered Chinese service by November 1962. These jets are the early production series models of MiG-21F-13 equipped with APU-28 missile launching rails (MLRs).
- Type 62: 15 Chinese assembled MiG-21F-13 from kits supplied by Soviet Union. The first batch of 10 was delivered in PLAAF in September 1964, followed by the remaining 5 in the 2nd batch delivered in February 1965, and all jets are the later production series models equipped with APU-13 MLRs, replacing earlier APU-28 MLRs.

== J-7 series ==
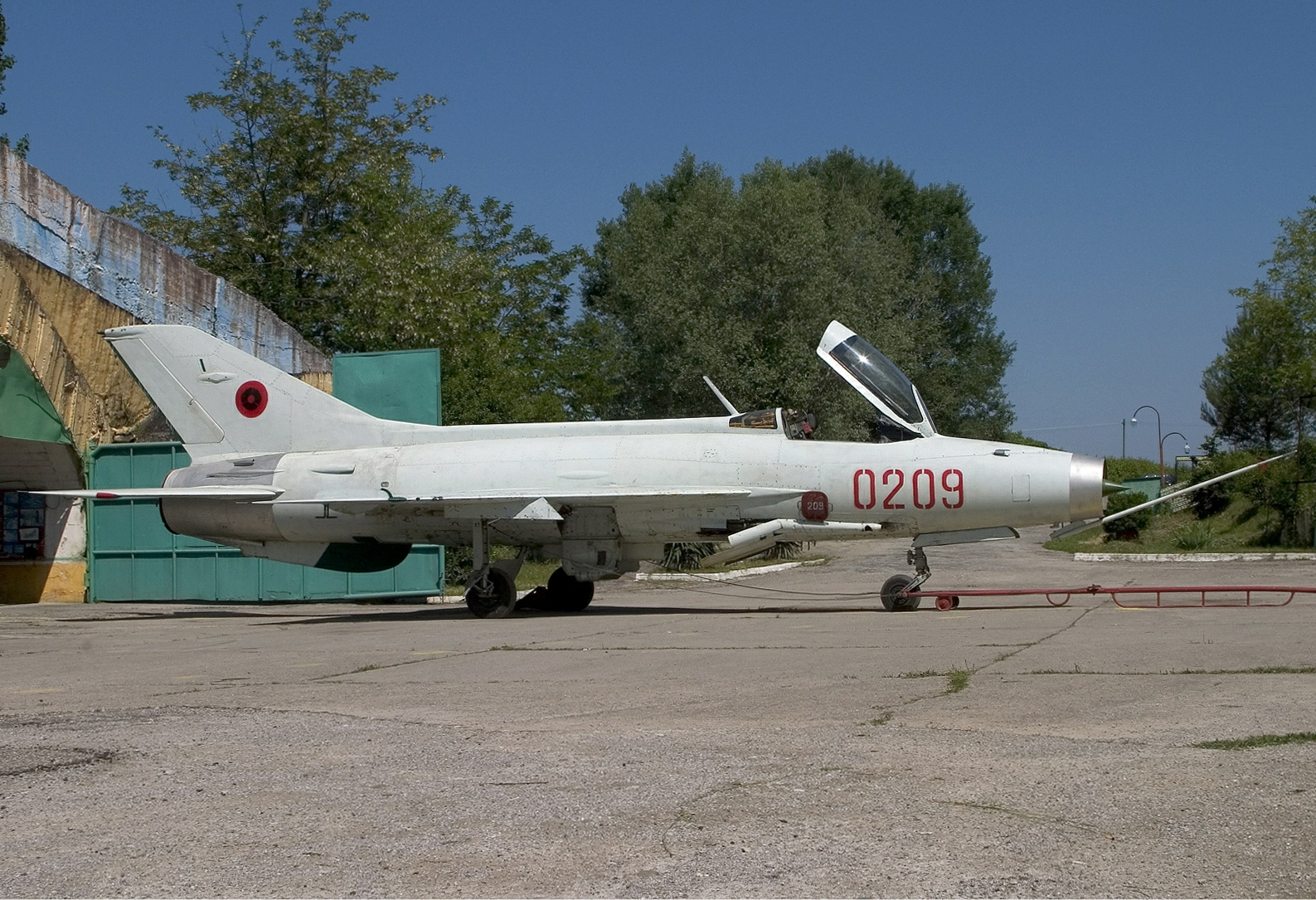
Albanian Air Force F-7A at Tirana Airport

The J-7 series was the first group of the J-7 produced. These were reverse-engineered from the MiG-21F-13 kits supplied by the USSR. However, due to the Chinese aerospace industry's inability to manufacture some of the components, the design underwent four significant changes. The initial production of J-7 was seriously affected by the political turmoil at the time, namely the Cultural Revolution, which delayed the planned production run. Due to the urgent need for the fighter, planned improvements for the early models were scaled back to allow production to begin sooner, allowing modifications to be made later when the technologies matured.

- J-7: First domestically built model. Fuselage was 7% stronger than MiG-21F-13 in terms of endurance to stress, achieved via more material, but this also means that the heavier J-7 was slightly less maneuverable than MiG-21F-13. J-7 was equipped with Chinese copy of SRD-5 ranging radar designated CL, short for Ce-jÜ Lei-da (测距雷达, meaning "range-finding radar" in Chinese). The range of the CL radar was only 3 km, significantly shorter than the 7 km range of the original SRD-5 on the MiG-21F-13. Production began in 1967, though only 11 J-7s were produced before production switched to improved models.
- F-7A: Another 12 were built and given to Albania for free as military aid. By this time, China was able to produce the APU-13 MLR of late production models of MiG-21F-13, which replaced the early APU-28 on the first 11 J-7s. The APU-13 became standard on all future J-7 variants. The completion of these last 12 J-7s marked the end of the initial production run in 1970, with a total of 23 built. After production ended, production of future models of J-7 was transferred to Chengdu Aircraft Corp (CAC) and Guizhou Aircraft Industry Corporation (GAIC).
- J-7 ASST: Like the original MiG-21, the J-7 also sometimes had stability problems at high altitude when traveling near Mach 2. In an attempt to avert this problem, an automatic stabilizing system was developed by Xi'an Flight Control Research Institute (also known as the 618th Institute) upon PLAAF request. A single J-7 was converted as an Automatic Stabilizing System Testbed for trials conducted between 1970 and 1971. However, the project proved to be too ambitious for the Chinese aerospace industry at the time and thus subsequently cancelled.
- J-7 drone: Retired J-7s were converted into aerial target drones. Subsequently, the same conversion was also carried out for later variants after they were retired. Some of these drones were destroyed by the Chengdu J-10 during weapons trials.

== J-7I series ==
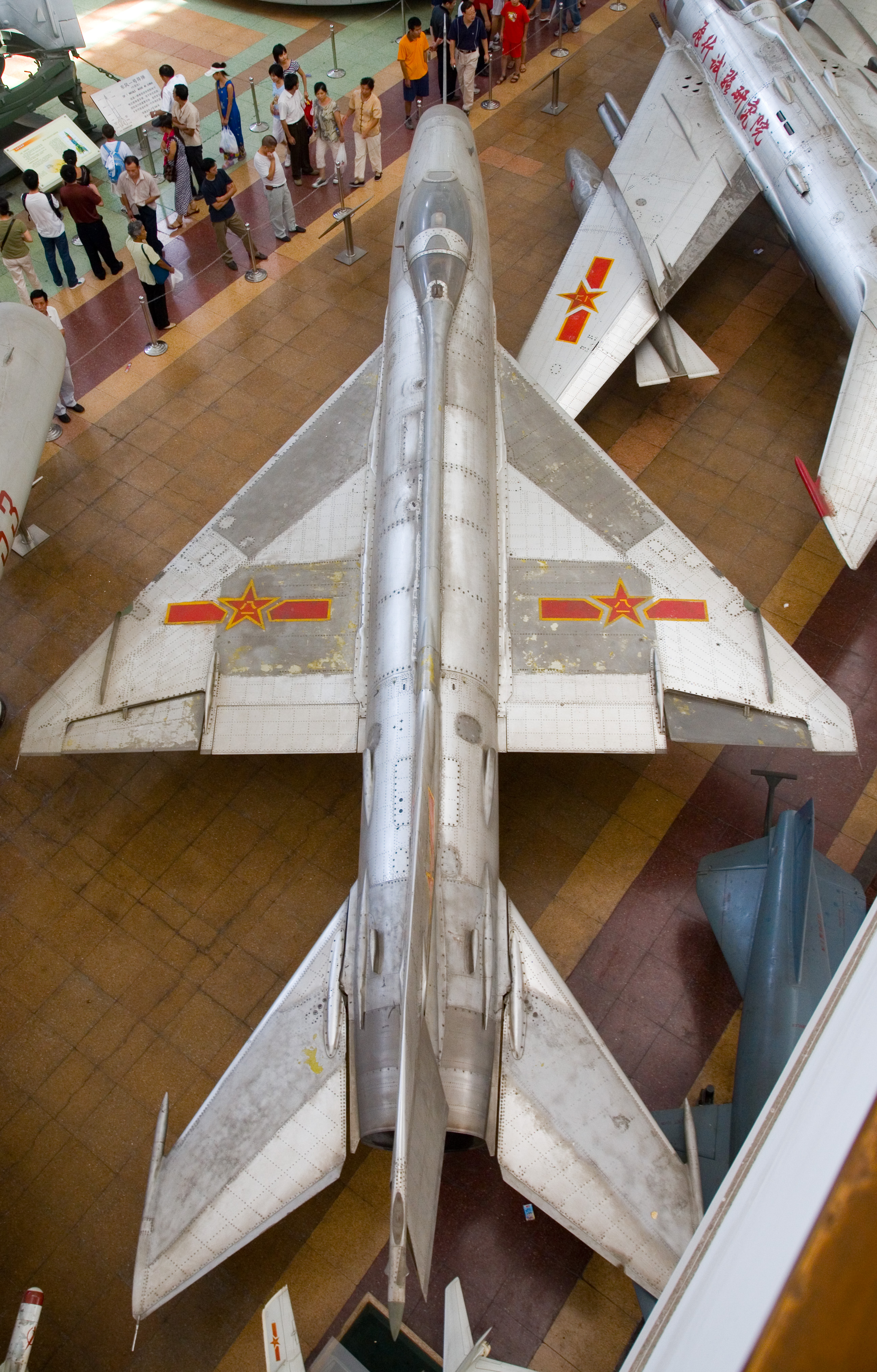
A J-7I seen from above. Note the delta wing and distinctive PLAAF markings.

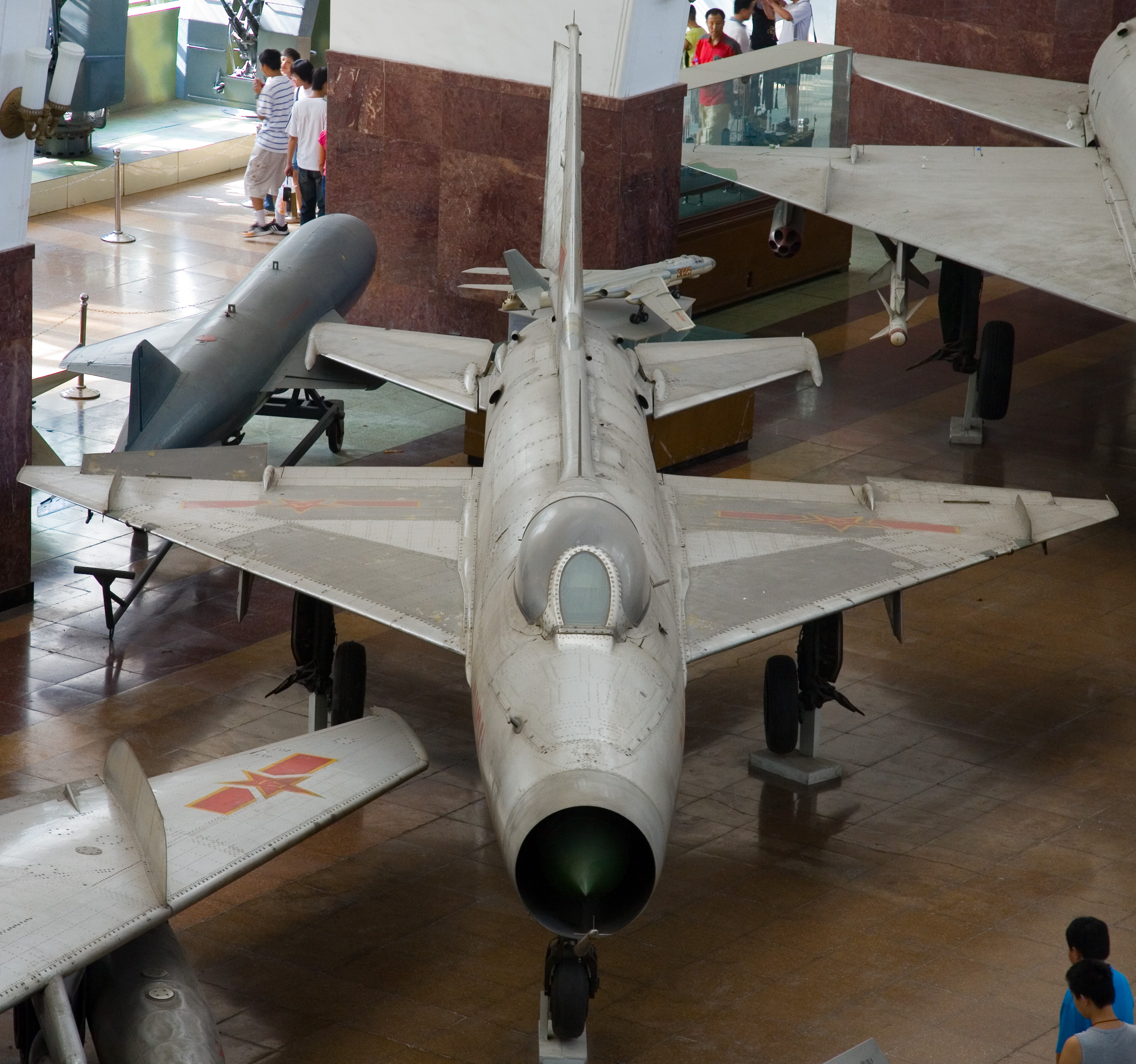
Frontal view of the same Chengdu J-7I seen from above.

The J-7I was an improvement over the earlier J-7, with production commencing in March 1969 following the formal order placement on August 25, 1968. However, the original goal proved to be too ambitious for the Chinese aerospace industry at the time, especially during the political turmoil of the Cultural Revolution. The program only succeeded after general designer Tu Jida obtained the permission to drastically reduce the originally planned six major upgrades to merely three.

- J-7I: Improved J-7 with an additional gun added on the portside at the cost of 100 liters of fuel. A variable intake nosecone replaced the three-stage fixed unit on J-7 and featured a thicker intake wall. A CL-2 ranging radar with 5 km of range replaced the earlier CL radar on J-7. Production ended in 1981 after a total of 147 were delivered, including upgraded versions such as J-7A and J-7IG, but excluding export versions.

In the 1960s, as soon as the PLAAF received the PL-2 air-to-air missile (AAM), J-7Is attempted to use the missiles to intercept USAF reconnaissance UAVs. However, since the PL-2's fuse was designed to target larger aircraft, these attempts were largely unsuccessful. The J-7I had more success shooting down an unknown number of USAF UAVs with guns and other air-to-air rockets.

- J-7I for North Korea: 40 late production version of J-7I were provided to North Korea as military aid. These can be distinguished from earlier versions of J-7I's in that the drag chute is moved to the base of the fin under the rudder, which since became the standard for all future J-7 models.
- J-7A: Improved J-7I with new wing pylons allowing 480 liter wing tanks to be carried under wings to make up the loss of fuel capacity that came with the new gun.
- J-7IG: Further improvement of J-7A. The G is for Gai (改), meaning "modified" in Chinese. The inefficient forward-hinged canopy, which was jettisoned with the ejection seat of Soviet design, was replaced by a rearward-hinged canopy jettisoned before the ejection of the new Chinese HTY-2 ejection seat. This model served as the basis for the J-7II.
- F-7A: Export version of J-7I for Egypt with a new engine WP-7II (涡喷-7乙, WP is short for Wo-Pen, abbreviation for Wo-Lun Pen-Qi, 涡轮喷气, meaning turbojet in Chinese), with mean time between overhaul (MBTO) increased from 100 hours to 200 hours. The CL-2 ranging radar is replaced by a more capable Type 222 radar, which is used on the J-7II. The Type 602 IFF, specially designed for export, replaced the original YD-3 IFF. The Type XU-1 low fuel warning system and Type Hang-Jia (航甲)-11-10 gun camera were both deleted. English language flight instruments replaced the Chinese instruments on the J-7. The F-7 utilized the original Soviet-type ejection system, where the forward-hinged canopy jettisoned with the ejection seat. Twenty were delivered between late 1981 and early 1982 to the Egyptian Air Force (EAF). Egypt would subsequently resell them to Iraq.
- J-7I reusable drone: Reusable range instrumentation drone converted from retired J-7Is to support AAM development. Development lasted from 1990 to 1998, during which time communication systems, pilot seats/ejection systems, armaments, and other systems not required for uncrewed flight were removed. Remote sensing, remote control, automatic flight control systems, and range instrumentation systems are needed to measure and record the off-distance of AAM. After repeated usage, these drones would be used as target drones, with all aircraft eventually meeting this fate. The reusable aerial range instrumentation drone was the one model in the J-7I series not designed by general designer Tu Jida.

== J-7II series ==
The J-7II series has the second-highest model count within the series. The general designer of most of the J-7II series models is also the designer of its predecessor, the J-7I, Tu Jida.

- J-7II: Improved J-7IG that can carry a 720-liter belly tank. Other improvements include the removal of the small window behind the canopy and the installation of a new WP-7II batch 02 engine. Thrust is increased from 39 kN to 42 kN (57.5 kN to 61 kN with afterburner), while fuel consumption is reduced by 2%, and service life of the engine is increased to 300 hours. However, the temperature of exhaust is also increased from 700 to 800 °C, accordingly when in operation the engine temperature is also increased by 100 °C. This fact was gravely overlooked, eventually causing problems to occur half a decade after J-7II production had finished, resulting in the grounding of all J-7IIs equipped with the same engine. When production ceased in 1986, a total of 375 J-7IIs were built.
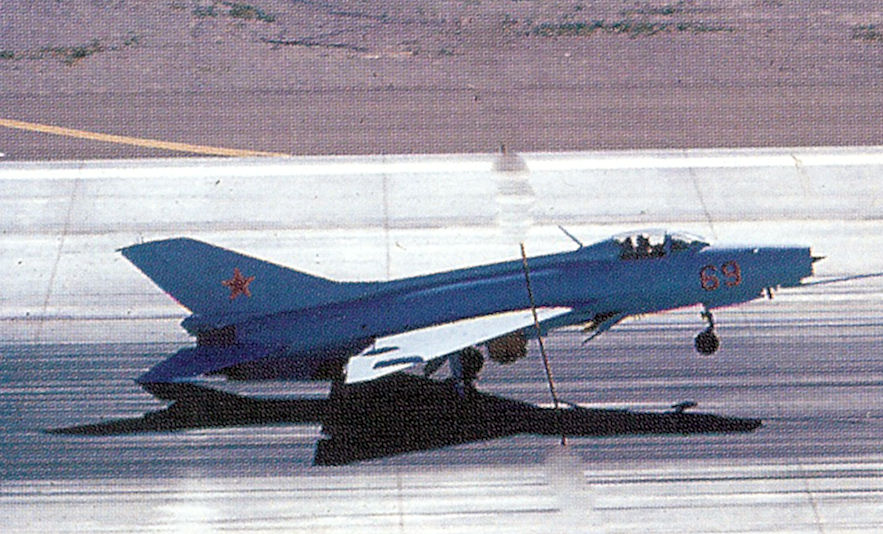
- J-7B of USAF 4477th Test and Evaluation Squadron.
  J-7B: Renamed J-7II. In June 1991, PLAAF discovered burnt or melted heat isolation pads in the pressure accumulator compartment in the rear section of the fuselage of J-7IIs stemming from high temperatures, due to which all J-7IIs were grounded. CAC spent half a year investigating and discovered over two dozen components that were affected by the increased temperatures of the new engine, and that these components were operating outside the temperature range for which they were originally designed. The fuselage was subsequently redesigned to fix the problem. This was begun in January 1992, but it took until May of the same year to rebuild all J-7IIs in PLAAF and PLANAF service. Lessons learned were also adopted for all subsequent production of J-7s after January 1992. The completion of the J-7B marked the final satisfactory closure of the upgrade program originally started more than a decade and half ago with J-7I during the Cultural Revolution, which lasted around a decade after its conclusion.
- F-7IIC: J-7II export version for Egypt. The C stands for Chu-Kou-Xing (出口型, "export version" in Chinese). Other improvements over the F-7A included being capable of carrying a 720-liter belly tank, and wing pylons rewired for French R.550 Magic AAM. The inefficient forward-hinged canopy jettisoned with the ejection seat of the Soviet design was replaced by a rearward-hinged canopy jettisoned before the ejection of a domestic Chinese design. To avoid confusion with a later model also designated F-7C, some Chinese documents also use the designation F-7W, with W standing for Wai-Mao-Xing (外贸型, "foreign trade version" in Chinese), but this designation was not used internally in CAC/GAIC. By the end of 1982, 40 were delivered to the EAF. A further 15 were later delivered to the USAF as aggressors to simulate MiG-21s. 4 were also given to Zimbabwe as military aid, and Pakistani pilots initially piloted them.
- F-7B: Further development of F-7IIC, with Hangjia-10-11 gun camera added, LSC-16C main landing wheel replaced previous models, DH-1030-24-1200-CS-IIB static converter from American company Phoenix Aerospace was adopted to meet the power requirement. The new engine, WP-7IIB (M batch), doubled the service life to 600 hours. Experience with the R.550 Magic by Egyptian F-7IICs revealed that the French AAM generates much more smoke when launched, and if the smoke is sucked into the engine, it could cause an engine failure. A continuous ignition system was added to ensure the engine would continue running when launching Magics. Furthermore, the fuel for engine start was changed from gasoline to kerosene, thus simplifying logistics and increasing engine reliability. The first customer, Jordan, required China to provide a service life expectancy for all onboard subsystems. This had never been done in China before; nevertheless, efforts were made to meet the requirement, resulting in confirmation that the service life expectancy of Chinese systems reached at least 60% of that of the original Soviet MiG-21. By November 1982, all 20 had been delivered to Jordan; these aircraft would later be transferred to Iraq. Twenty-two were also sold to Sudan, and 90 were sold to Iraq. The general designer of the F-7B is Peng Ren-Yin (彭仁颖).
- J-7II target towing jet: J-7II converted for target towing, with belly tank replaced by Type Aerial Drone (空靶) 4 aerial drones for anti-aircraft guns or aircraft gunnery practice.
- J-7IIS: Stealth research aircraft (serial # 137) used to explore measures to reduce radar cross section without changing the shape of the existing airframe. Results revealed that measures could be taken to increase stealth without altering the aircraft's shape, but that a new airframe design would be more efficient.
- J-7II HUD testbed: A testbed was needed to provide side-by-side comparison of various head-up display (HUD)s so a J-7II was converted in September 1986 to do so. HUDs tested include the British Type 956 HUDWAC and its license-built Chinese version designated JT-1 for J-7s, larger HK13 HUDs, and other HUDs for other aircraft.
- J-7IIH: Upgraded J-7II with GJ3-D general purpose MLR that can also launch PL-8s in addition to the older PL-2s and PL-5s. Since the PL-8 is 60% heavier than the PL-2, weight was added to the fore section of the fuselage to balance the change of center of gravity. Maneuverability is thus decreased slightly. A Type 941-4 decoy launcher is added, which was the first time ECM was adopted for J-7s. The general designers were Lu Yu-Ying (陆育英) and Song Kai-Ji (宋开基). When production ended in 1993, a total of 221 had been built.
- J-7H: Renamed J-7IIH with redesigned rear fuselage section to withstand the higher temperature of the new engine.
- J-7HH: PLANAF J-7H with magnesium alloy replaced by aluminum alloy to better withstand salinity and humidity.

== J/F-7M Air Guard series ==
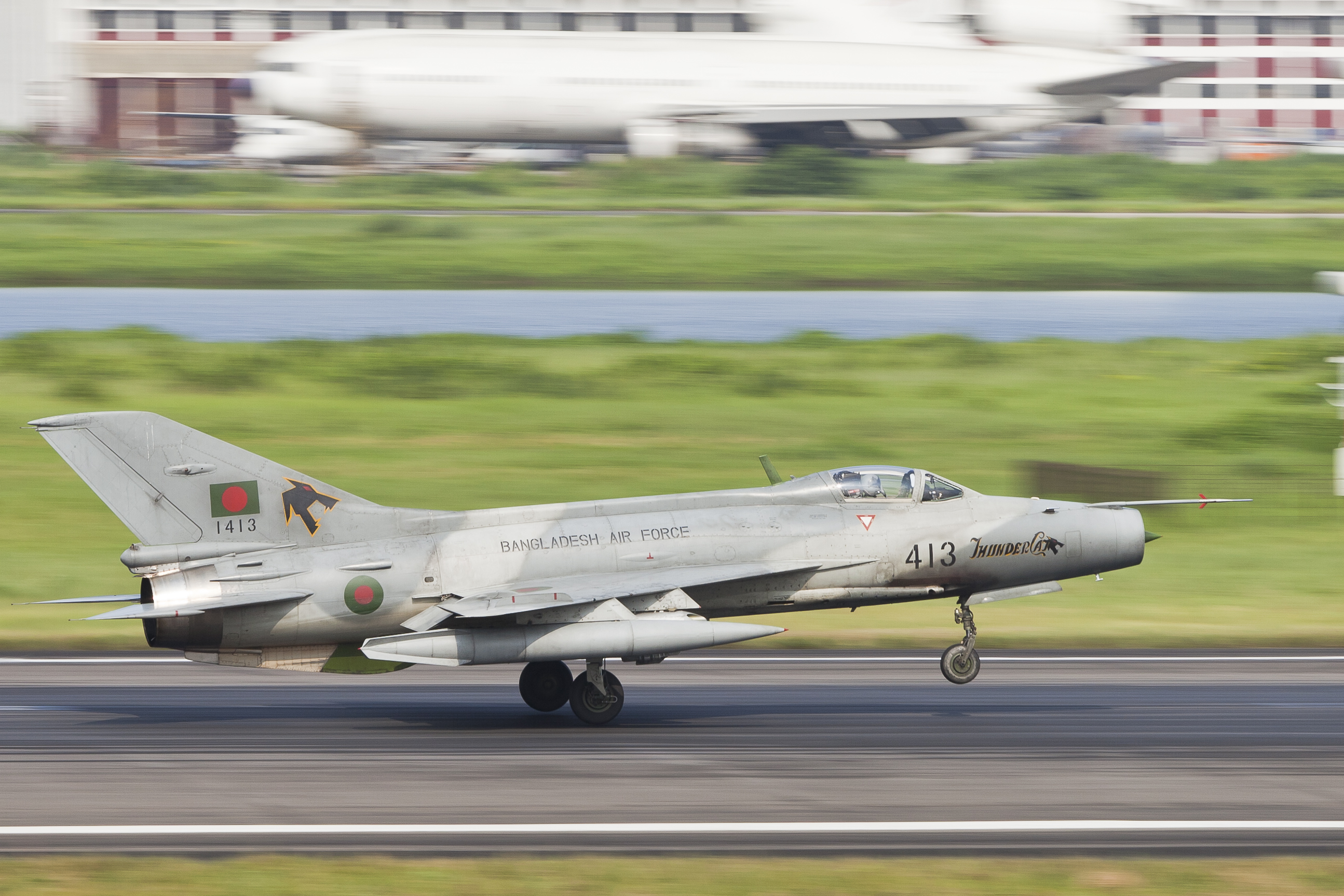
Bangladesh Air Force F-7MB

J/F-7M Air Guard series has the most models within the series. Initially intended for domestic use, but that plan was cancelled after the budget was cut, the series became a major export success, and received the name Air Guard. Most models of the series are equipped with British avionics, which were later on produced in China as part of a technology transfer deal. The general designer of most of these models is the same as that of the J-7I & J-7II, Tu Jida. Due to the urgent delivery schedule of the first customer, a multipronged approach was taken to expedite development. Several different prototypes were developed to test various subsystems of the aircraft. Development began at the end of 1978, with negotiations starting on March 3, 1979. After 10 rounds of negotiation that lasted 16 months, a deal was signed on June 30, 1980, which included a technology transfer. The entire J-/F-7M Air Guard program took six years to complete; the models produced are listed below:

- J-7M: A pair of prototypes of the F-7M. Both of which were completed before the delivery of British avionics and used to test the redesigned fuselage, landing gear system, and wings of the F-7M. The outer wing pylons are modified to carry rockets or bombs in addition to 480-liter wing tanks. The prototypes were also used to evaluate the aircraft's flight characteristics. At least one unit would later be converted to a J-7MG avionics testbed. British avionics were added for tests after China received the delivery from Great Britain.
- J-7M AAM & engine testbed: Two J-7Bs converted to J-7M engine & AAM testbeds to test newly designed engine and AAM launching systems of the F-7M.
- J-7M fuel & payload testbed: Two J-7IIs converted to J-7M fuel & payload testbeds to test the newly designed fuel system and payloads of the F-7M.
- J-7IIA: Originally a technology demonstrator of the J-7 with British avionics intended for domestic use, in September 1982, Tu Jida was named as general designer. When the projected was redirected to export, it became an avionics testbed for the F-7M. A total of two were built to test British avionics. The most distinct characteristic of this model is that it was equipped with British Type 956 HUDAWAC, and British Sky Ranger ranging radar in place of the original Chinese ranging radar. Other British avionics adopted were collectively known as the MADS-7 Avionics electronic defense system. A total of three were built. During testing, one of them was flown to Seoul Air Base in South Korea on August 7, 1983, by defector Sun Tianqin. The aircraft was later returned to China after Sun was sent to Taiwan on August 24 of the same year.

Pakistan contributed greatly to the J/F-7M program: although Pakistan did not purchase any F-7M and later returned all 20 F-7M's to China after evaluation. Requiring China to provide a better fighter (which eventually resulted in the F-7MP and F-7P), Pakistan did provide important support for the F-7M program, after the then Vice Chief of the Air Staff of Pakistani Air Force (PAF) Air marshal Jamal A. Khan inspected prototypes in test flights in July 1983 at Dalian. Pakistani contributions include:
In the last quarter of 1982, test flights revealed that the radar was plagued by ground clutter. China lacked Western radar-assisted air-to-ground attack experience and had no idea how to conduct the necessary flight tests specifically designed for Western avionics to address the problem. The Pakistani Air Force provided pilots (including F-16 pilots) to China to assist in these tests and helped in solving this problem. The test results eventually lead to the British providing a new radar Sky Ranger 7M for the F-7M, which is an upgraded Sky Ranger radar with additional circuitry to filter ground clutter.
The Chinese 630th Institute (responsible for the F-7M program) lacked the facilities and experience to conduct live-fire tests with advanced Western avionics, and it could not conduct mock air combat with Western aircraft. Therefore, from June to September 1984, two F-7Ms were sent to PAF Base Peshawar to conduct such tests. Pakistan Air Force (PAF) once again provided F-16 pilots to help complete the tests, with a Chinese team in Pakistan led by Chen Baoqi (陈宝琦) of the Chinese Aviation Ministry and Xie Anqing (谢安卿) of Chengdu Aircraft Co.

- J-7M composite testbed: Due to the adoption of lighter Western avionics, the center of gravity of the aircraft had shifted. As an alternative approach to rebalancing the center of gravity by adding weight to the forward fuselage, reducing weight in the rear of the fuselage by adopting composite materials was attempted. A single prototype with a vertical tail constructed from composite material was built for evaluation. Utilizing composite material has not only achieved the necessary weight reduction but also greatly simplified the production process and significantly increased the service life of the tail assembly. However, although the result was satisfactory when tests concluded in 1986, composite construction was not adopted for production aircraft due to Chinese technological bottlenecks in the 1980s. Because the manufacturing of composite materials at the time was complicated and costly for Chinese industries, the experience gained from utilizing composite materials on the J-7M would later help China achieve greater utilization of composite materials in later aircraft.
- F-7M: Serial production version with Peng Renying (彭仁颖) as the general designer. Due to lighter Western avionics, an additional 130 kg was added to the forward fuselage to balance the center of gravity, when it was decided not to use composites. The service life of subsystems onboard has reached 75% of that of Soviet ones. It can be visually distinguished from its prototype by the absence of the VHF radio antenna atop the vertical tail that was present on the J-7IIA. Sixty were delivered to the Royal Jordanian Air Force (RJAF) in May 1985 and subsequently transferred to Iraq. A single unit was sold to the USAF to play the aggressor role along with 15 F-7IICs delivered earlier. Various western avionics (later licensed and produced in China), including:
  - British Sky Ranger 7M ranging radar: Original Sky Ranger radar upgraded with additional circuitry to filter ground clutter. Has a parabolic antenna and weighs 41 kg with a range of 15 km.
  - British Type 956 HUDAWAC: (Head-Up Display And Weapon Aiming Computer) This HUD has a built-in targeting computer.
  - Poor quality of the domestic Chinese canopy interferes with the performance of the HUD, so a British canopy was used.
  - British avionics package collectively known as the MADS-7 electronic defense system.
  - British Type 50-048-02 digitized air data computer
  - British Type 2032 gun camera, which is linked to the HUD with the capability to exchange rolls of film while airborne. Each roll of film lasts slightly over 2 minutes.
  - An American converter that is over 30% more efficient than the original Chinese converter.
  - American Type 0101-HRA/2 radar altimeter with range increased to 1.5 km in comparison to the original 0.6 km of the Chinese radar altimeter it replaced.
  - British AD-3400 encrypted radio with a range in excess of 400 km at 1.2 km altitude.
  - Other improvements include a new domestically designed CW-1002 air data sensor, developed in conjunction with Western avionics, and the WP-7B/WP-7BM engine.
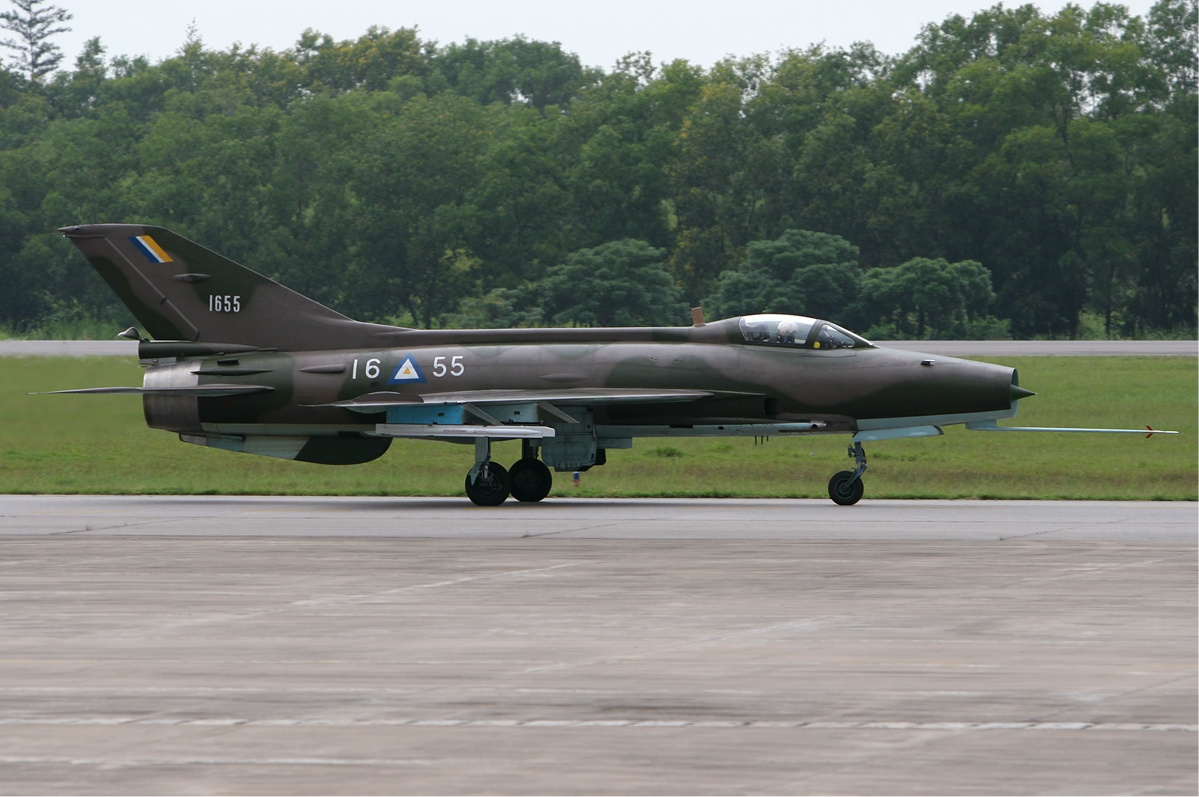
- Myanmar Air Force F-7IIK
  F-7IIK: A cheaper version of the F-7M, essentially a J-7IIH with the wings of the F-7M, but domestic Chinese avionics, including some, but not all of those of the F-7M. Avionics unique to this model include: Type 602 IFF, Type SRT-651C radio, Type GG-15 integrated altimeter system, Type XJ-6 g sensor. 10 delivered to Myanmar in 1990.
- F-7BK: Renamed F-7IIK with redesigned rear fuselage section to withstand the higher temperature of the new engine. 48 delivered to Myanmar by 1999. According to reports, the 10 F-7IIKs delivered earlier were subsequently updated to this standard.
- F-7BS: F-7BK equipped with a WP-7II Batch BM Type IV engine. Lacks a HUD, so the domestic Chinese canopy was used instead. Four were delivered to Sri Lanka in October 1991.
- F-7IIN: Export version of the F-7M for Zimbabwe. A J-7II with engine, wings, fuel & weapons systems of the F-7M. Due to the tropical climate of Zimbabwe, the cockpit air conditioning system was improved, while the helmet warming and de-icing systems were removed, along with the IFF. Eight were delivered to the Air Force of Zimbabwe (AFZ) in 1987.
- F-7BN: Renamed F-7IIN for AFZ after reworking the rear fuselage section to withstand the higher temperature of the new engine.
- F-7MB: F-7M derivative for Bangladesh with WP-7IIC replacing the WP-7IIB (Batch BM) engine, and LJ-2 Radar warning receiver (RWR)s. Photo reconnaissance pods can be carried on the wing pylons. The center-line pylon is modified to carry a Type 3A aerial target in addition to the belly tank. The instrument panel was modified to operate these new systems. 14 delivered to Bangladesh Air Force (BAF) in October 1989.
- F-7N: Improvement version of the F-7MB for Iran. The radio compass is replaced by AD2780 TACAN. Metric units replaced by British units on all displays. 30 delivered to the Islamic Republic of Iran Air Force (IRIAF) in two batches at the end of 1990 and early 1991, respectively.
- J-7IIM: Domestic Chinese version of the F-7M, with additional capability to be armed with PL-7 and PL-8 AAMs, Type 956 HUDWAC modified to be compatible with these missiles. As with the J-7H, additional weight is also added in the forward section of the fuselage to correct the center of gravity, which is changed by the heavier PL-8. Deliveries started in 1986.

== F-7MP/P Sky Bolt series ==
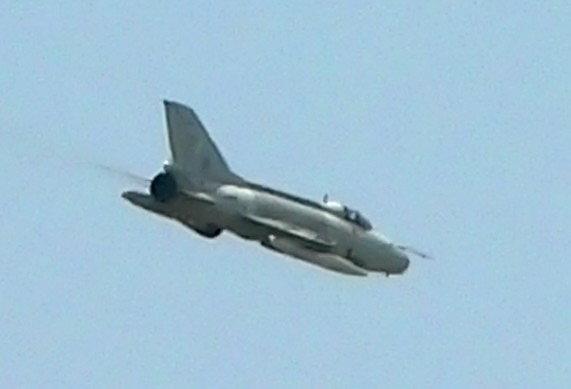
Pakistan Air Force F-7P over Lahore

Pakistan did not purchase any F-7Ms and later returned the 2 F-7Ms to China after evaluation. Requiring China to provide a better fighter, which eventually resulted in the F-7MP/P Sky Bolt series (The PAF does not distinguish between the two, referring to both as Sky Bolt). Evaluation by the PAF led to the conclusion that with the exception of range, the F-7 Sky Bolt series outperforms the Dassault Mirage 5 in every aspect. The number of modification requested by the PAF to the original F-7M totaled 24, making the F-7MP/P sufficiently distinct from earlier F-7M series to form a series of its own:

- F-7MP: Development of the F-7M tailored for Pakistan. this model included 24 separate improvements over the F-7M including using a Martin-Baker Mk 10 ejection seat to replace the HTY-2 on the F-7M, a Rockwell Collins AN/ARC-164 & 186 radio, AN/APX-101 IFF, LJ-2 RWR and a more advanced oxygen supply system than that of the earlier F-7M. Because the F-7MP carries more Western weaponry, the software of the Type 956 HUDWAC was upgraded to include parameters for these weapons. The outer wing pylons are modified to fire AAM in addition to rockets and bombs. The F-7MP was initially equipped with the Italian Grifo-7 fire control radar license assembled by the ISO - 9002 certified Kamra Avionics, Electronics and Radar Factory of the Pakistan Aeronautical Complex (PAC). The 55 km range Grifo-7 radar weighs 50 kg, and its introduction on the F-7MP made it the first export version of the F-7 series to be an all-weather fighter. This model is also the first to be upgraded with a Chinese helmet-mounted sight (HMS), which greatly enhanced its lethality in dogfights. All F-7 fighters delivered thereafter to Pakistan were equipped with such HMS. General designer Lu Yu-Ying (陆育英) and Peng Ren-Yin (彭仁颖). All 20 were delivered to the PAF on July 26, 1988.
- F-7P: Further development of the F-7MP for Pakistan with a HTY-4 ejection seat. Two more air conditioning outlets on the instrument panel to increase its efficiency. New RWR replaced the LJ-2 RWR. Grifo-MK-II fire control radar replaced Grifo-7 fire control radar on the earlier F-7MP. In comparison to the Grifo-7, the new radar only weighs an extra 1 kg (56 kg total), but the scan cone was increased to ±20 degrees from the original ±10 degrees of Grifo-7. The newer radar also had improved ECM and look-down/shoot-down capability, able to track up to four targets simultaneously while engaging one at a time. Like the earlier Grifo-7, the Grifo-Mk-II is also license-built by the ISO - 9002 certified Kamra Avionics, Electronics and Radar Factory of the Pakistan Aeronautical Complex (PAC). Metric instruments were changed to Imperial units. Delivery of 40 aircraft to the PAF began in September 1989.
- Super-7: General designer was Tu Jida. After a successful deal with China in the early 1980s resulting in the F-7M, the United Kingdom offered further upgrades to improve the performance of the F-7M by adopting either General Electric F404 or Pratt & Whitney PW 1120 turbofan engines. The radar options would include the Red Fox, a repackaged version of the Blue Fox radar used on Sea Harrier FRS Mk 1, or the Emerson AN/APG-69. Although radar tests were successful, the upgrade was rejected before any engine tests, because a single Western fire control radar or a single American engine would have cost more than a new J-7 (2 million United States Dollars, 1984 price).

== J-7III series ==
The J-7III series was the first J-7 to be equipped with fire control radar and thus the first all-weather fighter models of the J-7. However, due to the limitations of the Chinese avionics industry in the 1980s, the performance of the domestic Chinese fire control radars was not satisfactory. Due to its relatively large size, the nosecone had to be enlarged, which increased drag. As a result, only a few aircraft of this series were built.

- J-7III: Prototype of the J-7C, with a total of Five built. Equipped with a domestically developed HTY-3 ejection seat and a KL-11 autopilot. The MiG-21MF was reverse-engineered from an Egyptian source, but like the ejection seat, the original Soviet radar was replaced with a Chinese version. Designated as JL-7 and developed specifically for the J-7C. The JL-7 is a 2 cm wavelength mono pulse fire radar weighing 100 kg, with a maximum range of 28 km and MTBF of 70 hours. Because the WP-13F engine failed to meet the original schedule, the power plant was substituted with a WP-7. The general designer was Wang Shou-Nan (王寿南), later succeeded by Song Wen-Cong (宋文骢). Planned to enter service in 1985, but due to the delay of the WP-13's development, it was not until 1987 that the design was finally certified.
- J-7C: Renamed production version of the J-7III powered by WP-13F. Equipped with a Type 481 data link, which enables the ground-controlled interception centers to feed directions directly to the autopilots of the aircraft to fly "hands off" to the interception. The Type 481 data link was later included as standard equipment for all later models intended for domestic use. A total of 17 were built in a production run lasting from 1989 to 1996.
- J-7IIIA: Prototype of the J-7D. The general designer was Wang Zi-fang (王子方). Equipped with a KJ-11A autopilot, JD-3II TACAN, ADS-1 air data computer, Type 563B INS, WL-7A radio compass, Type 256 radar altimeter, TKR-122 radio, 930-4 RWR, 941-4A decoy launcher, and JL-7A radar. Armed with PL-7 & PL-8 AAM and twin 23 mm guns. The HK-13A HUD replaced the HK-03D optical sight of the earlier models. The upgraded JL-7A fire control radar added look-down/shoot-down capability. Equipped with a WP-13F engine because the WP-13FI was not certified until October 1994.
- J-7D: Renamed production version of the J-7IIIA with the WP-13FI engine. Initial certification was received in November 1994, but it was not until December 1995 that the model was finally fully certified due to the need to certify WP-13FI on the aircraft. A total of 32 had been built when production stopped in 1999.

== F-7C series ==
The F-7C series is the first J-7 series to adopt a side air intake design, with the intention of housing a more powerful radar in the nose cone. The project was initiated in 1985, but it never went into production. The general designer of this series is Tu Jida.

- F-7C: Original successor of the Super 7 with side air-intakes and a Chinese engine and avionics, because the domestic Chinese aerospace industry in the 1980s could not provide products on par with the West. Evolved into the F-7CP after more than 3000 wind tunnel tests. Kept as a cheaper alternative to the F-7CP for a while before the cancellation of the F-7C series.
- F-7CP: With CP standing for China Pakistan. An F-7C with Western avionics and engine. A 1:1 metal mockup was built before development evolved into the F-7S Saber II.
- F-7S Sabre II: Successor to the F-7CP jointly developed by CAC and Grumman for the Pakistan Air Force. Compared to its predecessor, the air intake of the Sabre II forms a 10° angle, and the wings are changed to a trapezoid shape with leading-edge extension, resulting in greatly improved aerodynamic performance. The plane was slated to use the General Electric AN/APG-67 radar of the F-20 Tigershark.

== J-7E series ==
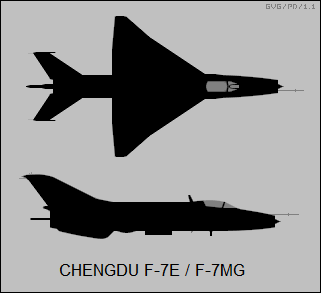
J-7E diagram

The J-7E (NATO reporting name: Fishcan-D) is the day fighter series of the J-7 that utilizes a double delta wing which greatly improved maneuverability from previous models. It was decided that to maintain good maneuverability, the series would not be equipped with fire control radar or medium range AAMs. Equipped with only ranging radar and close range AAM, new features of this series included utilization of a carbon-carbon composite brake that quadrupled the service life to more than a thousand landings. Utilization of an aluminum-lithium alloy that reduces weight by 17% and pressure ground fueling system replacing the gravity based ground fueling system that drastically reduced the time of fueling by 80% to 6 minutes from the original half an hour. Deletion of the port side gun resulted in an increased fuel capacity by 100 liters, the ammo for the starboard side gun was reduced to 60 rounds. The WP-13F engine increased mean time between overhauls (MTBO) to 300 hours and the service life to 900 hours. Maximum payload is increased to 1.6 tons. Newer avionics replaced the older ones on earlier J-7s. The general designer of the J-7E series was Lu Yu-Ying (陆育英).

- J-7IV: Prototype of the J-7E, with production of the prototypes begun in October 1987, and test flights completed in May 1993, three years after the testing started. In addition to other issues, the Chinese JT-1 HUD proved particularly problematic and frequently malfunctioned during flight testing.
- J-7E: Renamed production version of the J-7IV with problems exposed by the prototypes being corrected, such as aileron flutter, automatic pitching, lateral Dutch roll, and the HUD. This model is equipped with a Chinese version of the Italian Pointer 2500 ranging radar used initially on the Q-5M, modified to fit into the nosecone of the J-7E. Pointer 2500 ranging radar is a development of the Pointer ranging radar used on the initial production version of the AMX International AMX, which is in turn is a licensed Italian copy of the Israeli Elta EL/M-2001B pulse Doppler ranging radar. More than 260 had been built when production ended in 2001.
- J-7EB: Unarmed version for the PLAAF August 1st Aerobatic Team with B standing for Biao-yan (表演, meaning perform/show in Chinese). The gun, weapon pylons, and fire control systems were deleted. Twelve were delivered in 1994, and another 12 were delivered between 1999 and 2000. All 24 are equipped with HTY-6 ejection seats. After reequipping the August 1st aerobatic team with the more advanced J-7GB, all 24 J-7EBs were rearmed and returned to active service.
- J-7EH: Navalised version of the J-7E, modifications include measures to counter salinity and humidity.
- J-7L: J-7E upgrade. Due to the inherent difference between the J-7E and its successor, the J-7G, not all of the approximately three dozen improvements the J-7G has over the J-7E could be retrofitted to the J-7E during its upgrade cycle. Instead, only a small portion of the improvements the J-7G had over J-7E could be retrofitted to the J-7E; the most significant of these is the incorporation of the fire control radar of the J-7G into the J-7E, which gives the latter its all-weather capability. The "L" in the designation stands for Lei-da (雷达, "radar" in Chinese), signifying that the model is equipped with fire control radar.

== J/F-7F series ==
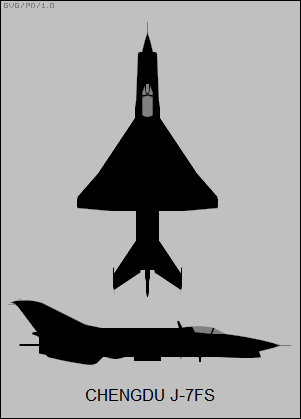
J-7FS diagram

The J/F-7F series is an alternative development to the earlier F-7C series, as it inherits the design characteristic of eliminating the nose intake. However, unlike the side intakes adopted by the F-7C series, the J/F-7F series utilizes an under-chin intake. This series is mainly intended for research on under-chin intakes and has not entered series production.

- J-7F: JF-7 program begun in 1995, and it is the first J-7 design to utilize under-chin intake, which is identical to that of Vought F-8 Crusader. No prototype was built before the design evolved into J-7FS.
- J-7FS: Developmental technology demonstrator built by CAC as the successor of earlier J-7F, with S stands for Shi-yan (试验, meaning experimental in Chinese). JF-7S utilizes WP-13IIS engine and a redesigned under-chin inlet similar to that of Vought XF8U-3 Crusader III, with a divider inside the intake. The most apparent visual characteristic of the intake is that the bottom of the intake extends forward, thus forming an angle with the fuselage, unlike the F-8 Crusader and J-7F designs, which are perpendicular to the fuselage. First flew in 1998, only two prototypes were built before being replaced by J-7MF.
- F-7MF: Successor of the J-7FS, with rectangular under-chin inlet similar to that of the Eurofighter Typhoon, and movable canards for better aerodynamic performance. No prototypes were ever built before the project being abandoned in favor of the FC-1.

== MiG-21 upgrade subcontract ==
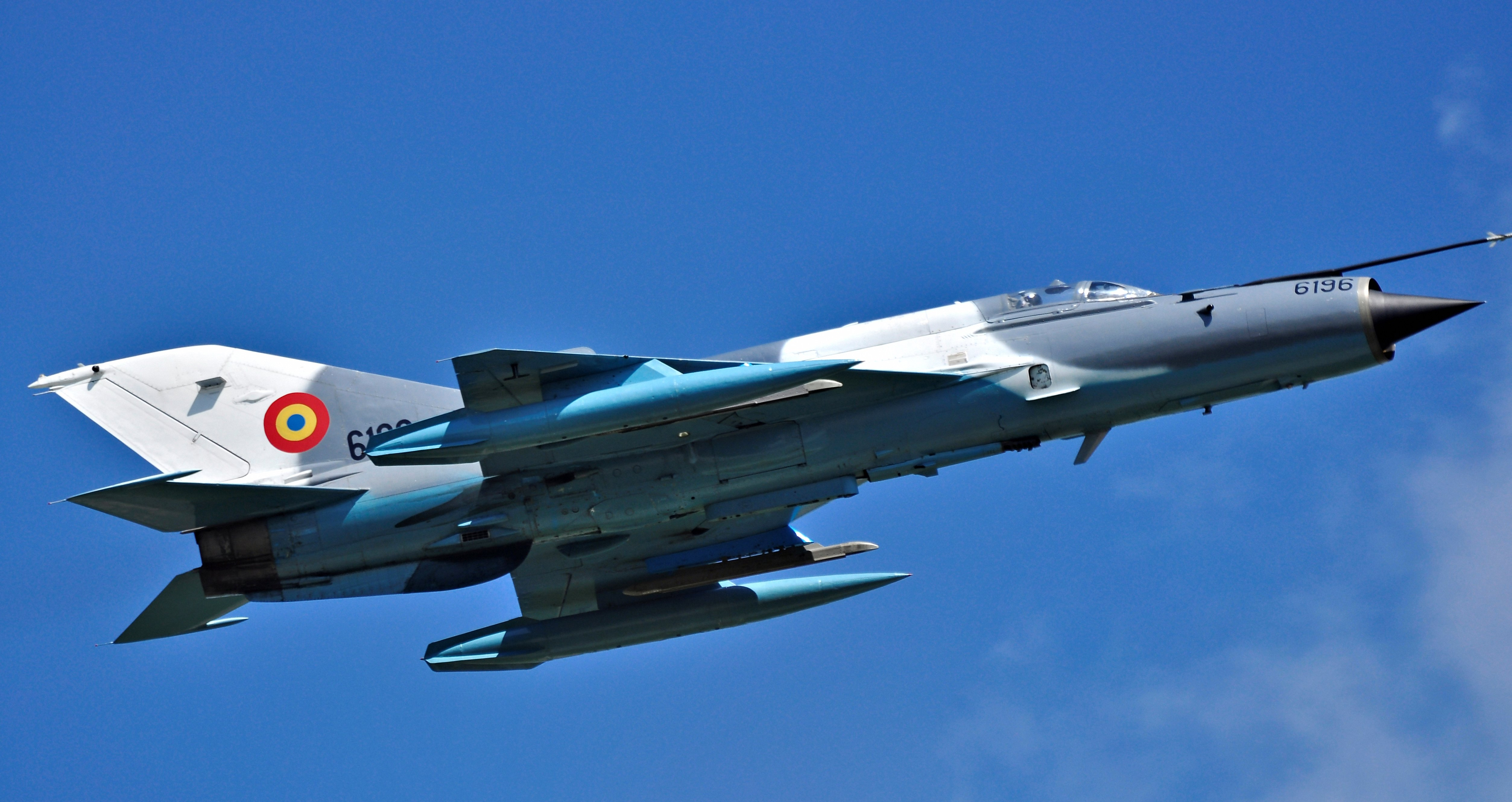
Romanian Air Force MiG-21 LanceR in 2012

In the 1990s, export of the F-7 series had significantly dropped from its peak in the 1980s when China failed to secure any new orders in the decade. However, China was successful in completing two deals for MiG-21 and F-7 upgrades by Israeli Elbit Systems as its subcontractor, and experience gained from these subcontracting jobs enabled China to develop more capable J-7 models later.

- MiG-21 LancerR-A: In the early 1990s, Elbit proposed MiG-21 LanceR (R for Romania) as its bid to upgrade Romanian MiG-21. However, Russia refused to provide any technical data/information on the MiG-21 that was necessary to integrate Israeli avionics into the Soviet airframe, as the Israeli bid was in direct competition with the MiG-21-93, Russia's upgrade proposal. Elbit turned to China for help, and as part of the deal between China and Israel, China would receive technology transfers of Israeli avionics. Eventually, Elbit beat the Russian and won the Romanian MiG-21 upgrade deal, and the first MiG-21 LanceR begun made its maiden flight on August 22, 1995. MiG-21 LanceR-A is the first model of MiG-21 LanceR family and it is a ground attack version that is armed with LITENING electro-optical targeting pod. A single MFD is added to the flight instrumentation. Chinese electro-optical targeting pod based on LITENING is designated as DC-1.
- MiG-21 LancerR-C: MiG-21 LanceR-C is the air defense version of the MiG-21 LanceR series, with maiden flight on November 6, 1996. Equipped with EL/M-2032 airborne fire control radar, this model has two MFDs on its flight instrument. In addition to provide the technical data needed, the Research Institute for Special Structures of Aeronautical Composite of Aviation Industry Corporation of China (AVIC) also supplied the nosecone radar radome built of composite material. More than one Chinese radar development houses have benefited from the technological transfer of EL/M-2032 radar, such as Nanjing Institute of Electronic Technology (南京电子技术研究所, which is also commonly known as the 14th Institute), China Electronics Technology Group Corporation No. 38 Research Institute (中国电子科技集团公司第三十八研究所, which is also commonly known as the 38th Institute), and of the Radar and Electronic Equipment Research Academy of Aviation Industry Corporation of China (AVIC) (中航工业雷达与电子设备研究院, which is also more commonly known as the 607th Institute).
- MiG-21-2000 for Myanmar:
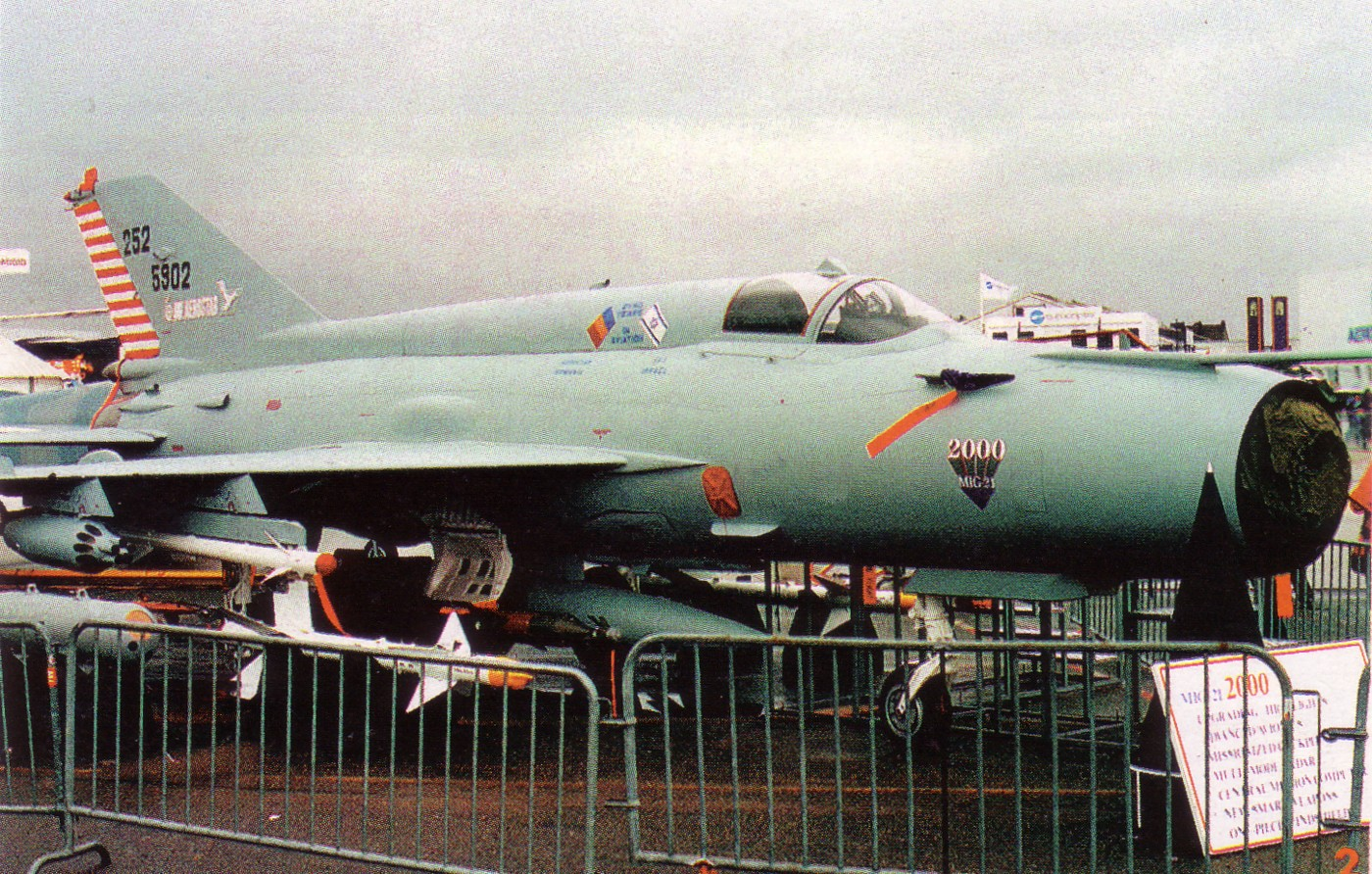
  MiG-21-2000
  At the 6th Aviation Expo China held in Beijing, Elbit offered China a further upgraded MiG-21 designated as MiG-21-2000 to upgrade Chinese J-7s. Unit price would start at 4 million US dollars and will decrease by half as more Chinese-made components are used when the Chinese aerospace industry gets more involved in the program. Although China did not accept the deal due to financial constraints, it did participate in the Israeli upgrade of Chinese-built F-7s in Myanmar two years later, though the details are sketchy. Besides the fact that nobody else knows the F-7s better than Chinese themselves who built them first place, there was also an important political consideration. Myanmar was under comprehensive sanctions by the US and the EU due to its human rights record. China, in its capacity as a subcontractor when Elbit won a contract in 1997 to upgrade its F-7 fleet, would also serve as an agent/proxy for Israel, gaining access to Israeli technology to develop its upgrades of the J-7 later on. A total of 36 Myanmar F-7s were reportedly upgraded. However, the exact details and business arrangement remain unclear because neither China nor Israel has disclosed any detailed information.

== J/F-7MG series ==
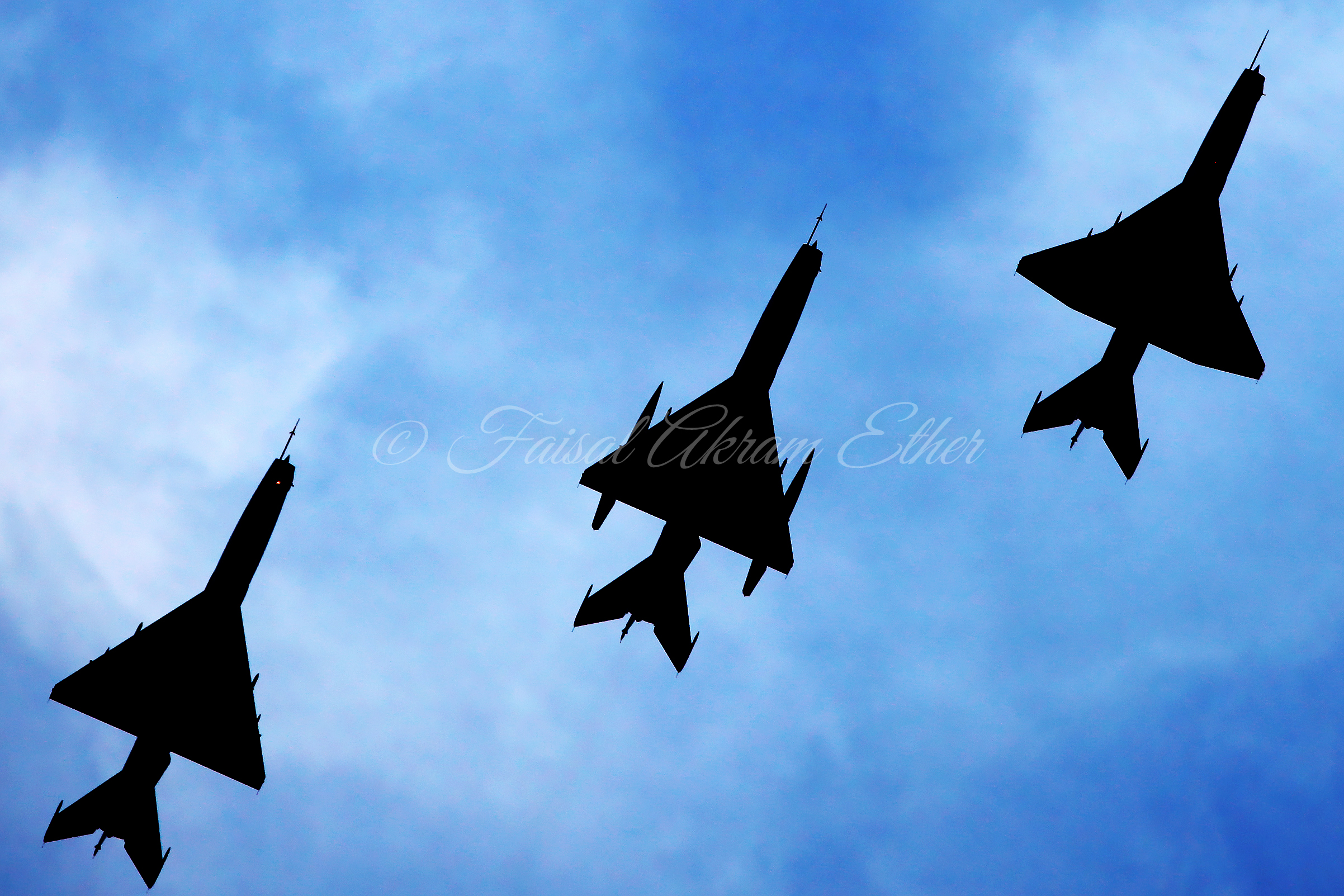
A Bangladesh Air Force F-7BG leading two F-7MBs

After a nearly decade-long hiatus from the internal military aircraft market in the 1990s, China attempted to re-enter by marketing the F-7MG series fighters, based on the J-7E series. As with the earlier J/F-7M series, to expedite development, it was decided first to develop different prototypes, each with a distinct task for trials.

- J-7MG avionics testbed: A single J-7M with serial number 0143 was converted for testing the avionics of J-7MG. Avionics tested included Type KTR-908 and 909 radios, Type KNR-634A navigation system, Type KTU-709 TACAN, Type KDF-806 compass, Instrument landing system (ILS). The J-7MG avionics testbed is the only model in the J/F-7MG series without a double delta wing. Initially, the program was not funded by the Chinese government, so the 30 million ¥ needed was jointly funded by CAC, Guizhou Liyang Aeroengine Co., Ltd., and China National Aero-Technology Import & Export Corporation (CATIC) using the companies' own money.
- J-7MG: prototypes of F-7MG, with avionics tested on J-7MG avionics testbed and double delta wings of J-7E. A total of 2 were built, with serial numbers 0142 and 0144. British GEC-Marconi that provided avionics for earlier J/F-7M once again was selected to provide airborne radar for the J-7MG series, and this time the British firm provided Super Sky Ranger (SSR) radar with planar slotted array antenna capable of scanning ±30°, and it is an upgraded version of earlier Sky Ranger / Sky Ranger 7M ranging radars with parabolic antenna used on J/F-7M. SSR can be hooked up with either ARINC 429 or MIL-STD-1553 data buses, and it provides both air-to-air and air-to-ground ranging.
- F-7MG: Development of J-7MG, with a single piece windscreen replaced the 3-piece of J-7MG. Evolved to F-7BG.
- F-7BG: F-7MG for Bangladesh. 12 delivered in 2006 along with 4 FT-7BG.
- F-7NM: F-7MG derivative for Namibia, 6 delivered in 2005.W/ domestic Chinese fire control radar either SY-80 series by (中航工业雷达与电视设备研究院) or KLJ-6E fire control radar by the 14th research institute, but the exactly which one of the two is not confirmed by China. Both fire control radars have almost identical performance, such as both have a range of around 30 km and weights around 60 kg. China decided to have both radars enter series production and distribute them among different orders of F-7s. If the F-7NM is equipped with the SY-80A series radar, then the F-7NI would be fitted with the KLJ-6E, and conversely, if the F-7NM is equipped with the KLJ-6E radar, then the F-7NI would be fitted with the SY-80A series radar.
- F-7NI: F-7MG derivative for Nigeria with 12 delivered. Chinese sources have confirmed that the F-7NI differs from the F-7NM only in avionics, but have failed to identify exactly which fire control radar is used on which model. Thus, if the former is equipped with a SY-80A series radar, the latter would be equipped with a KLJ-6E radar. Conversely, if the former is equipped with KLJ-6E radar, the latter would be equipped with SY-80A series radar. The practice of concurrently producing two different radars with nearly identical performance is to keep both production lines running, so that the knowledge of different vendors is not lost.

== J/F-7PG series ==
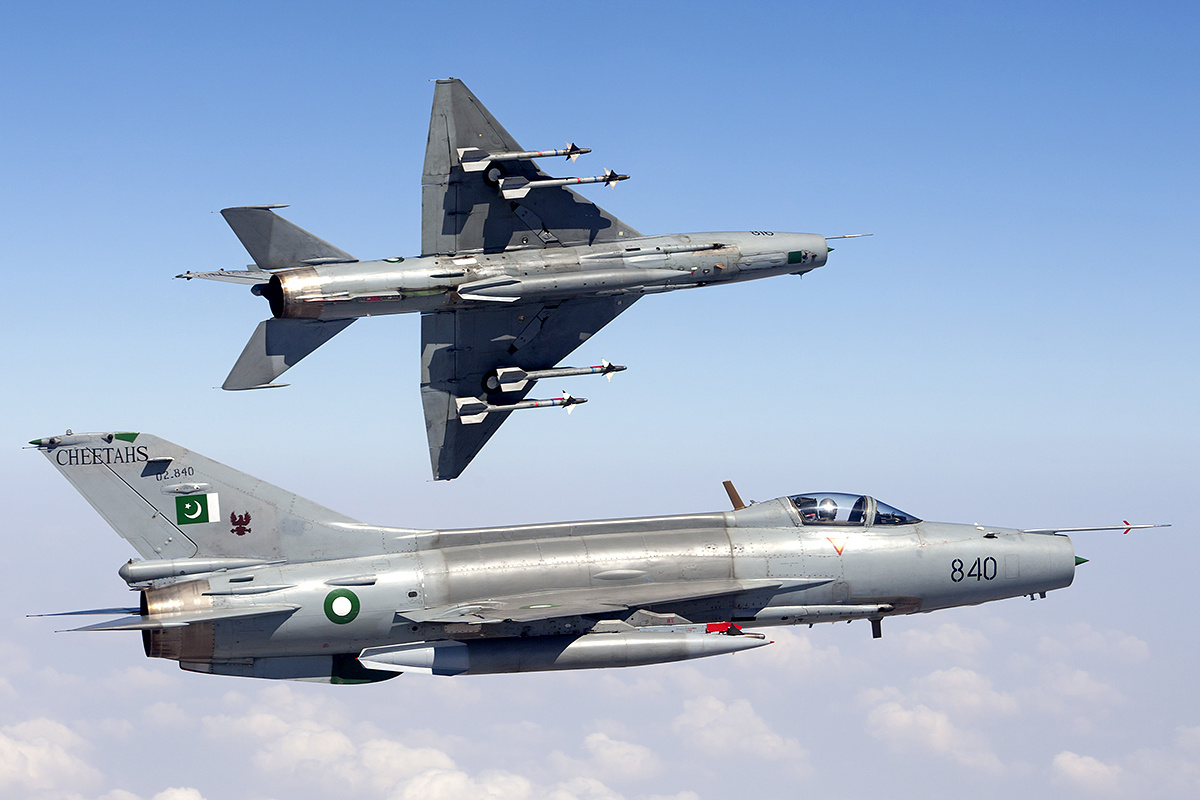
PAF Chengdu F-7PGs from the No. 20 Squadron

Although SSR radar is more advanced than its predecessor, Sky Ranger 7M, it remains a ranging radar, which the PAF was not satisfied with. To meet the Pakistani requirement for a more capable airborne radar, a fire control radar was needed. Additionally, PAF required other improvements over the original J-7MG, resulting in the J/F-7PG series.

- J-7PG: prototype of F-7PG equipped with Grifo-MG radar that replaced Super Sky Ranger radar. Equipped with a GPS, a Chinese HTY-6M ejection seat, and a new onboard oxygen supply system. As with the J-7MG, it has an additional gun on the port side to increase firepower. Other avionics upgrade includes a new ARW9101 RWR can store more than 100 threats, along with other newly designed system.
- F-7PG: production version of J-7PG, with a single piece windscreen replacing the 3-piece of J-7PG.The aircraft is equipped with an efficient avionics system, which includes a GEC-Marconi Avionics HUDWAC (head-up display and weapon aiming computer), as well as Garmin global positioning and bombing navigation systems.

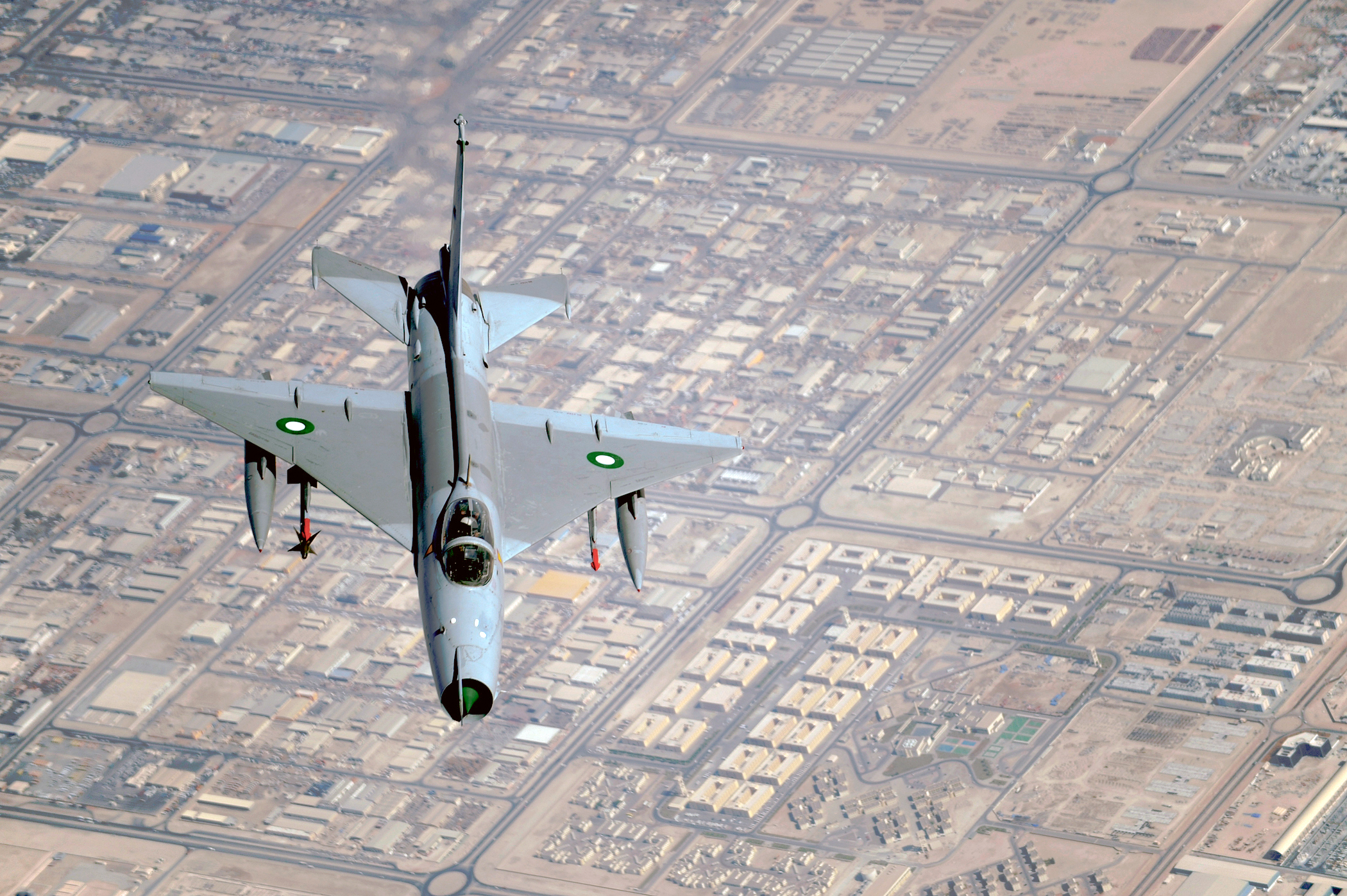
Pakistani F-7PG

It is also equipped with a Super Skyranger radar, an FIAR Grifo-7 Mk II radar (export), and a Type 226 PD radar. It could also fire Western missiles like the Sidewinder and R550 Magic. First batch of 20 was delivered at the end of 2001, with a total of 57 eventually delivered to PAF.

== J/F-7G series(BGI) ==
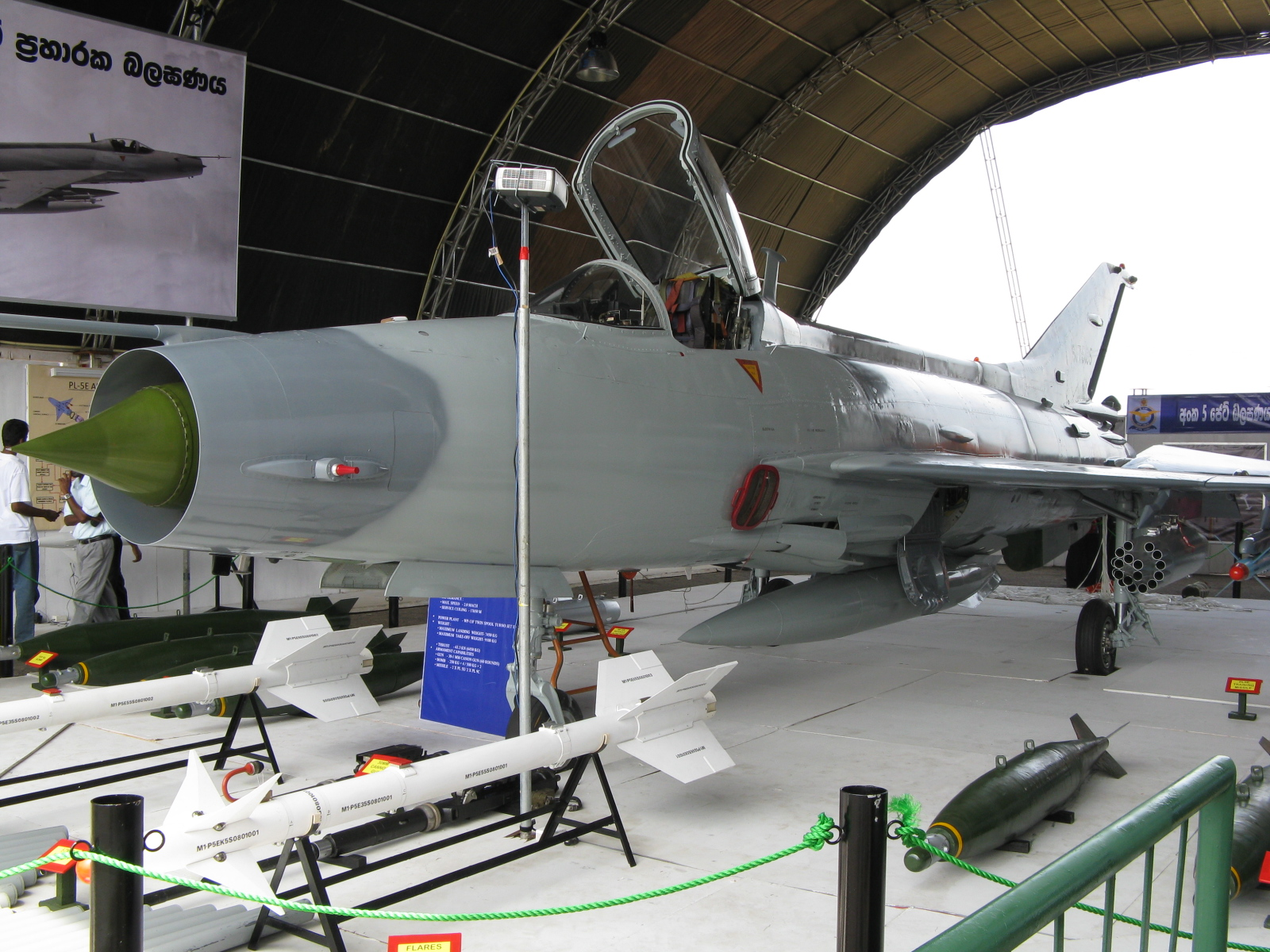
Portside view of a Sri Lanka F-7GS

J/F-7G series is the further development of the earlier J-7E series. Contrary to frequent but erroneous claims, the fire control radar is not the Chinese development of EL/M-2001B radar, because EL/M-2001B is a pulse Doppler ranging only radar. Instead, the Chinese fire control radar for J-7G is developed from the EL/M-2032 fire control radar China obtained from Israel when it was a subcontractor for Elbit in the Romanian MiG-21 LanceR program described above.

- J-7G: Upgraded J-7E with more than 30 improvements with Mr. Song Cheng-Zhi (宋承志) as the general designer. Equipped with HOTAS and a Chinese derivative of EL/M-2032. However, due to the inherent limitation of the small size of the nosecone, the antenna size of EL/M-2032 has to be significantly reduced, resulting in the drastic decrease of the original 150 km range of EL/M-2032 by approximately 60% to slightly more than 60 km. Development began in March 2002 and was completed in July 2004, with delivery beginning in Nov 2004.
- J-7GB: J-7G derivative for August 1 aerobatic team. Replacement for J-7EB begun in 2004
- F-7TN: Cheaper version of J-7G for Tanzania with KLJ-6E fire control radar with 30 km range.
- F-7GS: Modified version of J-7G for Sri Lanka with other avionics specifically to meet requirements of Sri Lanka, and these modifications include:

A new head-up display (HUD) with a new Stores Management System, which is essentially a functional cockpit-pilot interface to help establish the status of stores, including configuration, fusing, and weapon codes, etc. A voice warning system, color video recorder, elaborate cockpit lighting (Night Vision Goggle Compatible), and a more precise and jitter-free AOA probe, GPS, and inertial navigation system (INS). GMAv AD 3400 UHF/VHF multifunction com, Type 605A ('Odd Rods' type) IFF, KLJ-6E pulse Doppler radar with a range of 30 km. WL-7 radio compass, 0101 HR A2 altitude radio altimeter, LTC-2 horizon gyro, XS-6 marker beacon receiver, VOR, Distance Measure Equipment (DME), Instrument Landing System (ILS), tactical aircraft navigation (TACAN) system, and an improved Type 8430 air data computer with HOTAS.
The new HUD developed by Norinco subsidiary North Electro-optic Co., Ltd. (北方光电股份有限公司) provides pilots with displays for instrument flying, with air-to-air and air-to-ground weapon aiming symbols integrated with flight-instrument symbology. It can store 32 weapon parameter functions, allowing for both current and future weapon variants. In air-to-air combat, there are four modes (missiles, conventional gunnery, snap shoot gunnery, dogfight), and a standby aiming reticule allows for all eventualities. VCR and infrared cockpit lighting on the F-7GS is to be used with a Chinese (Cigong Group) Helmet Mounted Sight (HMS) slaved to the PL-9 AAM. The new air data computer, coupled with the new HUD in the air-to-ground mode, is capable of projecting both Constantly Computed Impact Points (CCIP) and Constantly Computed Release Points (CCRP).

=== F-7BGI ===
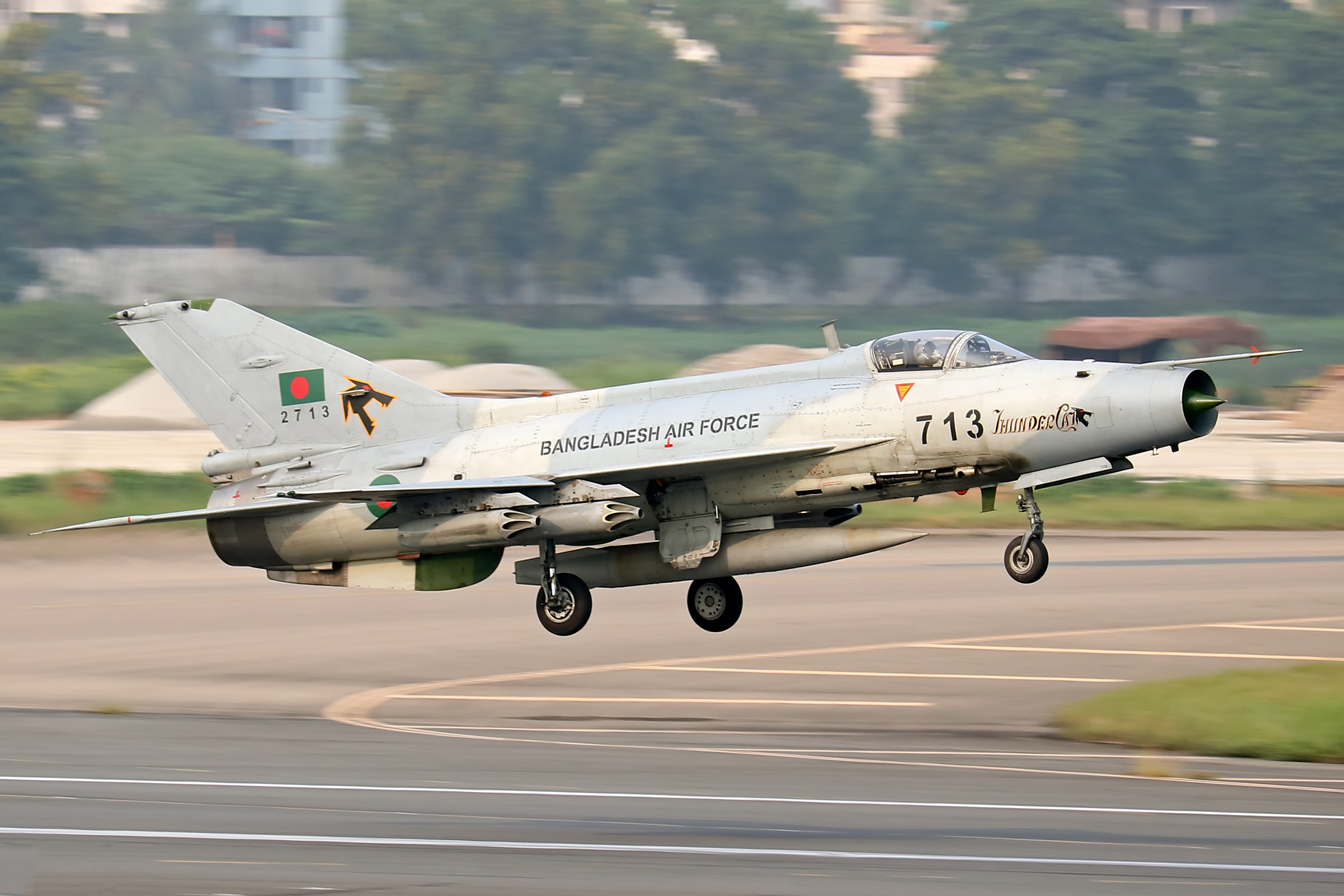
Bangladesh Air Force F-7BGI carrying 90 mm unguided rocket pods

F-7BG upgraded with J-7G technology for the Bangladesh Air Force. Unlike other cheaper and downgraded export variants of the J-7G, the F-7BGI (I for Improved) is, in fact, more advanced than the J-7G it is developed from. Improvements to the F-7BGI over the F-7BG, such as three MFDs and a more powerful fire control radar, would, in turn, be incorporated into the later-developed J-7G2. The capability of F-7BGI is improved over earlier F-7BG resulted from upgrades listed below, and delivery of 16 was signed in 2011 and completed in 2013. Even with the latest J-7 technology, this aircraft cannot carry any BVR missile and is armed only with short-range, infrared homing air-to-air missiles for air to air combat, like other J-7s.

  - F-7 BGI has a speed of Mach 2.2
  - 5 Hard-points to carry air-to-air missiles, laser-guided bombs, GPS-guided bombs, drop tanks
  - Full glass cockpit.
  - F-7 BGI has Grifo MG radar.
  - Afterburner: F-7 BGI (82 kN) thrust
  - F-7 BGI got J-7G2 Airframe with double delta wing. This improves the lift at high angles of attack and delays or prevents stalling.
  - G-limit: +8 g / -3 g
  - Service ceiling: 17,500 m (57,420 ft) for F-7 BGI
  - 3 Multifunction displays and HOTAS.
  - Reportedly more maneuverable than most of the MiG-21s and many of the other contemporary fighters.
  - F-7BGI can armed with the PL-5, PL-7 and probably the PL-9 short range air-to-air missiles.
  - Can carry bombs and unguided rocket pods of 3000 pounds, including Chinese laser-guided bombs.
- J-7G2: J-7G upgrade with KLJ-6F radar to increase range over 86 km, MFDs and other avionics first used on F-7BGI. Also able to incorporate conformal tanks.

== JJ-7 trainer series ==
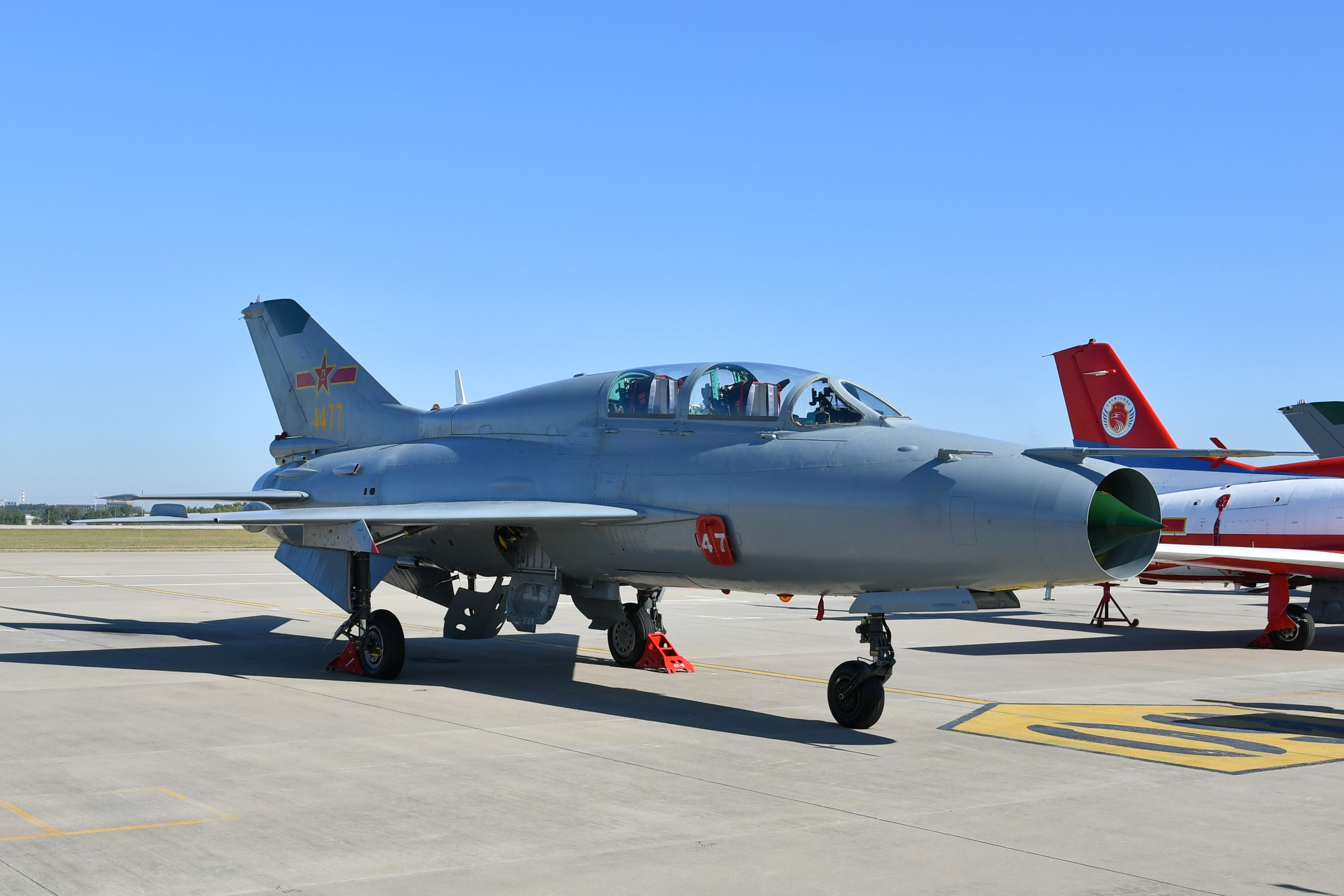
PLAAF JJ-7A

The J-7 trainer variants are the Chinese-developed trainer versions for domestic Chinese use, and this series is supplied to both the PLAAF and PLANAF.

- JJ-7: Based on J-7II but is 40% different than J-7II, equipped with a domestic HTY-2 ejection seat, Type 226 ranging radar, and other domestic Chinese systems. Guns are deleted but belly pylon can carry semi-buried twin 23 mm gun. The program formally began on January 4, 1984, with state certification received on February 4, 1988.
- JJ-7A: Improved JJ-7 including more advanced avionics such as HUD and FJ-1 data recorder. Improved air conditioning system. Development began in Feb 1994, with state certification received on Dec 7, 1996.
- JJ-7 IR pod testbed: Converted JJ-7A carrying infrared electro-optical instrumentation pod under the fuselage to test airborne electro-optical pods developed. The complete name of the instrumentation system is Infrared Measuring Pod System (IRMPS), which has a diameter of 0.5 m, a length of 5.2 m, and a weight of 450 kg.

== FT-7 trainer series ==
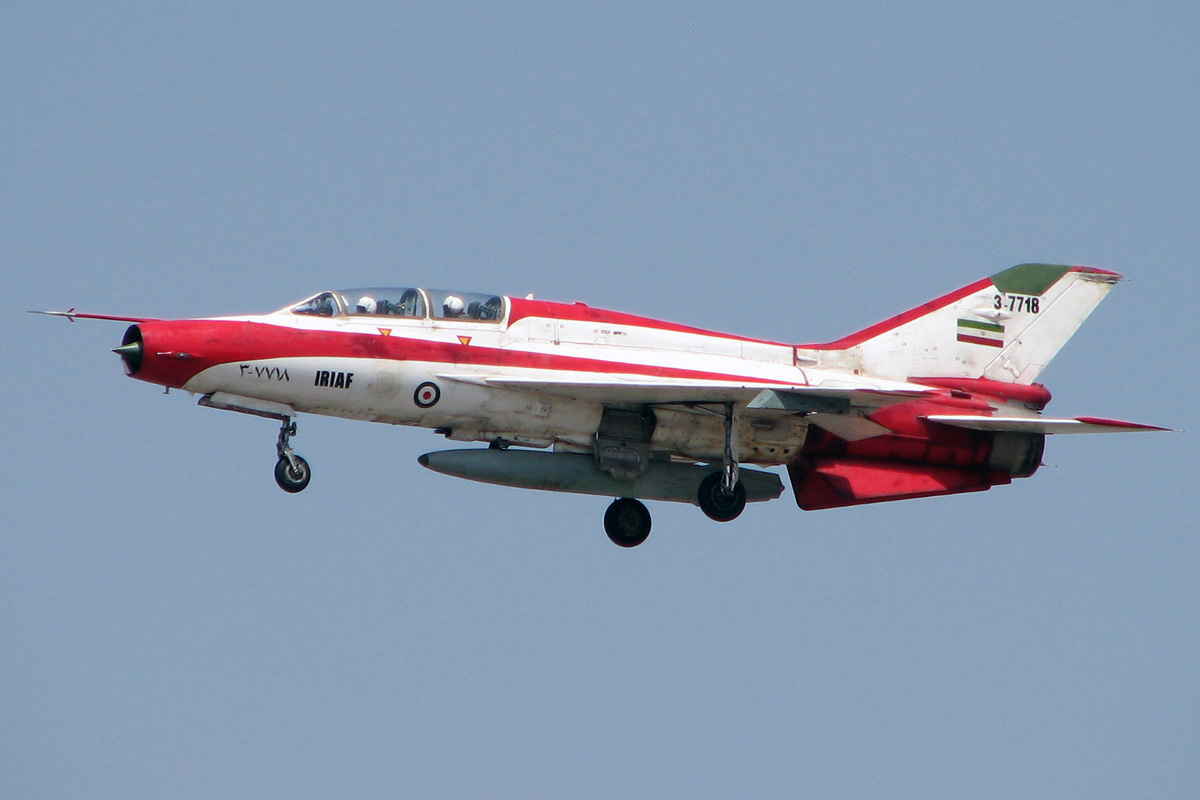
Iranian Air Force FT-7

FT-7 trainer variants for export are characterized by the fact that nearly every trainer version is equipped with the same avionics and weaponry as its equivalent fighter version to minimize the transition process and to maintain the combat capability of the trainers.

- FT-7: export version of JJ-7 with Chinese replaced by English for all displays. Iran was the first customer to place an order at the end of 1986. 8 more were to Jordan, and another four were delivered to Pakistan
- FT-7P: Improved FT-7 for Pakistan with fuselage increased by 0.61 meters, and internal fuel capacity increased by 350 liters. The general designer was Wu Bing-Lin (吴炳麟), and development began in March 1989, with 15 delivered to the PAF by 1991.
- FT-7B: F-7B export version for Egypt and Jordan.
- FT-7BB: Trainer version of F-7MB for Bangladesh with 8 delivered.
- FT-7BI: Trainer version of F-7B for Iraq. Due to the urgent need for the Iran–Iraq War, pylons of these trainers are rewired to carry French air-to-surface weaponry for ground attack missions. A total of 20 were delivered in 1982.
- FT-7BS: Trainer version of F-7BS for Sri Lanka with 2 delivered.
- FT-7K: Trainer version of F-7IIK for Myanmar with at least half a dozen delivered.
- FT-7Z: Trainer version of F-7IIN for Zimbabwe with 2 delivered in 1986. It's not clear if these jets were military aid or sales.
- FT-7BZ: 2 FT-7Z converted in Zimbabwe in 1991 with a reworked rear fuselage to withstand the higher temperature of the engine.
- FT-7N: Trainer version of F-7N for Iran with four underwing pylons and a total of 4 delivered.
- FT-7PG: Trainer version of F-7PG for Pakistan with 9 delivered.
- FT-7BG: Trainer version of F-7BG for Bangladesh with 4 delivered.
- FT-7NG: Trainer version of F-7NG for Namibia with 2 delivered.
- FT-7NI: Trainer version of F-7NI for Nigeria with 3 delivered.
- FT-7TN: Trainer version of F-7TN for Tanzania with 2 delivered.
- MiG-21 LancerR-B: Trainer version of MiG-21 LanceR-A and MiG-21 LanceR-C developed by Israeli firm Elbit to upgrade Romanian MiG-21s. China is not a direct contractor but instead, a subcontractor to Elbit. Maiden flight of MiG-21 LanceR-B was made on May 6, 1996.

== See also ==
Related development

- CAC/PAC JF-17 Thunder
- Guizhou JL-9
- Project Sabre II
- 2025 Dhaka fighter jet crash
- Saebyeol-4
