= 71st Regiment of Foot (1758) =

- Active: 1758–1763
- Country: Kingdom of Great Britain (1707–1800)
- Branch: British Army
- Type: Infantry

The 71st Regiment of Foot was a regiment in the British Army from 1758 to 1763.

It was formed in northern Scotland on 28 April 1758 from the 2nd Battalion of the 32nd Regiment of Foot and took part in the Raid on Cherbourg in 1758 and in the capture of Belle Isle off the French coast in 1761. The regiment was disbanded in 1763.

== Regimental Colonels ==
- 1758–1763: William Petitot
