= 71st United States Colored Infantry Regiment =

- Active: 3 Mar 1864 - 8 Nov 1864
- Country: United States
- Allegiance: Union
- Branch: Infantry

Commanders
- Colonel of the regiment: Willard C Earle

The 71st United States Colored Infantry Regiment was one of 170 United States Colored Troops (USCT) regiments raised by the Union Army during the American Civil War.

== Service ==
Between 3 Mar and 13 Aug 1864, the 71st was organized in Black River Bridge and Natchez, MS, and at Alexandria, LA. It was attached to the District of Natchez, part of the District of Vicksburg, and was posted for the defenses of Natchez. They were disbanded on 8 Nov 1864, when it was consolidated with the 70th United States Colored Infantry Regiment.

== Engagements ==
The 71st was involved in skirmishes during an expedition to Buck's Ferry between 19-22 Sept 1864.

== See also ==
- List of United States Colored Troops Civil War units
