= 71st Division =

71st Division or 71st Infantry Division may refer to:

== Infantry Division ==
- 71st Division (1st Formation) (People's Republic of China), 1949–1950
- 71st Division (2nd Formation) (People's Republic of China), 1969–1985
- 71st Infantry Division (France)
- 71st Infantry Division (Wehrmacht), Germany
- 71st Division (Imperial Japanese Army)
- 71st Division (Philippines)
- 71st Infantry Division (Russian Empire)
- 71st Guards Motor Rifle Division, Russia
- 71st Guards Rifle Division, Soviet Union
- 71st Motor Rifle Division, Soviet Union
- 71st Mechanized Division, Soviet Union
- 71st Division (Spain)
- 71st Infantry Division (United States)
- 71st Division (United Kingdom)

== Other divisions ==
- 71st Anti-Aircraft Artillery Division, Soviet Union

== See also ==
- List of military divisions by number
- 71st Brigade (disambiguation)
- 71st Regiment (disambiguation)
