= 71st Regiment =

71st Regiment may refer to:

- 71st Regiment of Foot (1758), former British Army regiment, 1758–1763
- 71st Regiment of Foot, Fraser's Highlanders, former British Army regiment, raised for the American Revolution, 1775–1786
- 71st (Highland) Regiment of Foot, former British Army regiment, active in 1777–1881
- 71 (Yeomanry) Signal Regiment, British Territorial Army regiment established in 1969
- 71st Coorg Rifles, British Indian Army regiment, active in 1767–1904
- 71st Infantry Regiment (Greece), Hellenic Army regiment established in 1940
- 71st Infantry Regiment (New York), New York State Guard regiment established in 1850
- 71st Air Defense Artillery Regiment (United States), US Army regiment established in 1918
- 71st Infantry Regiment (PA), Philippine Army regiment
- 71st Infantry Regiment (United States), former US Army regiment, active in 1918–1919
- 71st Cavalry Regiment (United States), US Army regiment established in 1941

American Civil war

- 71st Illinois Volunteer Infantry Regiment, Union Army regiment
- 71st Ohio Infantry, Union Army regiment
- 71st Pennsylvania Infantry, Union Army regiment
- 71st United States Colored Infantry Regiment, Union Army regiment
