= 71 =

71 may refer to:

== Common use ==
- 71 (number), the natural number following 70 and preceding 72

== Films ==
- '71 (film), 2014 British film set in Belfast in 1971
- 71: Into the Fire, 2010 South Korean film

== Places ==
- 71, the number of the French department Saône-et-Loire
- 71, nickname for the city of Wrocław
- Various highways; see List of highways numbered 71

== Years ==
- 71 BC
- AD 71
- 1971
- 2071

== Other uses ==
- 71, the atomic number of the element lutetium
- 71 Niobe, a main-belt asteroid
- Brazil v Germany, a match on the 2014 FIFA World Cup where the final score was 7-1.

== See also ==
- 71st (disambiguation)
