= ACAE CJ-1000A =

Chinese high-bypass turbofan jet engine

CJ-1000A
- Type: High-bypass turbofan
- National origin: China
- Manufacturer: AECC Commercial Aircraft Engines (ACAE) Shanghai
- First run: May 2018
- Major applications: Comac C919
- Status: Under development

The ACAE/AECC CJ-1000A (Chinese: 长江-1000A; pinyin: Cháng Jiāng; lit. 'Yangtze-1000A') is a Chinese high-bypass turbofan engine currently under development by the Aero Engine Corporation of China (AECC), through its Commercial Aircraft Engines (ACAE) division in Shanghai.

== Design ==
The CJ-1000A is being developed as the domestic powerplant for the Comac C919, a narrow-body aircraft, offering a thrust range of 10,000–20,000 kgf (98–196 kN; 22,000–44,000 lbf).

The engine measures 1.95 metres (6 ft 5 in) in diameter and 3.29 metres (10.8 ft) in length, comparable to the 1.98-metre (6 ft 6 in) diameter and 3.32-metre (10.9 ft) length of the CFM LEAP-1C, the current engine for the C919. It features a two-spool design, similar to the LEAP-1C, with a single-stage fan, three-stage booster, ten-stage high-pressure compressor, two-stage high-pressure turbine, and six-stage low-pressure turbine (compared to seven stages on the LEAP-1C). The CJ-1000A is equipped with eighteen hollow titanium wide-chord fan blades and a single annular combustor uses 3D printed fuel nozzles.

== Development ==
A model of the CJ-1000A was first displayed at the Aviation Industry Corporation of China (AVIC) booth during the 2011 Beijing Air Show, with initial completion targeted for 2016. At the time, service entry was projected for 2020, and a possible collaboration with MTU Aero Engines was under consideration.

In 2013, AVIC subsidiary Shenyang Aeroengine Research Institute proposed using the 28,700 lbf (128 kN) WS-20, originally developed for the Xi'an Y-20 military airlifter, as a domestically-produced powerplant for the C919. Although the WS-20 incorporated newer technology and entered service in 2023, the proposal was ultimately rejected by Comac in favor of the CJ-1000A, which relies on technology closer to the CFM International CFM56 than the LEAP family.

Assembly of the first CJ-1000AX prototype was completed in December 2017 after 18 months of work, with 24 additional engines planned to support the airworthiness certification program. The engine was initially slated to enter service after 2021. In May 2018, the first engine successfully ran in a Shanghai test cell, reaching a core speed of 6,600 rpm.

As of May 2018, AECC projected certification by 2027 and entry into service by 2030, roughly eight years behind the original timeline. The CJ-1000A would need to deliver approximately 28,200 lbf (125 kN) of thrust to replace the CFM LEAP-1C. A higher-thrust variant, the CJ-1000B, rated at 29,500 lbf (131 kN), is planned for future extended-range versions of the C919.

In March 2023, reports indicated that service and flight testing of the CJ-1000A had begun using a Xi'an Y-20 test aircraft. In March 2025, AECC reported that development was "progressing well" in trials. An executive from a Comac C919 supplier stated in April 2025 that the CJ-1000A would "soon" be able to power a C919 on verification flights. However, American aviation journalist Jon Ostrower noted in May 2025 that public sightings of the engine remained rare since flight testing began in 2023.

According to a January 2026 comment from analyst Mayur Patel from aviation data consultancy OAG Aviation, Chinese certification and initial deliveries of the CJ-1000A engine are likely to begin in 2027 or 2028, while mass production is expected from around 2030. According to the South China Morning Post, aviation expert Brian Yang Bo said in March 2026 that the design of the CJ-1000A had been completed and that certification was ongoing at the time; he further said he thought the engine would be installed in a first Comac jet for daily use between 2028 and 2029, particularly as a Chinese five-year plan from early 2026 had called for increased aircraft production as well as development and the roll-out of a domestically developed engine.

== Other derivatives ==
=== CJ-2000 (AEF3500) ===
The CJ-2000 is a scaled-up version of the CJ-1000 HP spool and combustor core, with 10 compressor stages and two turbine stages. As of June 2018, the new 78,000 lbf (350 kN) engine destined for the COMAC C929 was expected to be demonstrated in 2023 and enter service in 2030. It features a new low-pressure spool with a four-stage LP compressor booster up from three, seven LP turbine stages up from six (compared to the GEnx-1B which also has seven LPT stages; the UEC PD-35 has nine HP compressor stages), as well as composite fan blades and fan case. The bypass ratio would be over 10, with a 50.3 OPR in climb, and a target TSFC of 0.53–0.525 lb/lbf/h (15.0–14.9 g/kN/s).

=== CJ-500 ===
The CJ-500 would offer 18,000 to 22,000 lbf (80 to 98 kN) for the Comac 909.

== Applications ==
- CJ-1000A: for the Comac C919, as an alternative to the CFM LEAP-1C engine.

== Specifications ==
Data from Flight

==== General characteristics ====
- Type: two-spool high-bypass turbofan
- Length: 3.29 m (10.7 ft)
- Diameter: 1.95 m (76.8 in)
- Dry weight:

==== Components ====
- Compressor: one-stage fan (18 hollow-titanium, wide-chord blades), three-stage booster, 10-stage HP
- Combustors: single-annular combustor, 3D printed fuel nozzles
- Turbine: two-stage HP, six-stage LP

==== Performance ====
- Maximum thrust: 25,000 lbf (111 kN) CJ-1000AX demonstrator, 28,200 lbf (125 kN) CJ-1000A, 29,500 lbf (131 kN) CJ-1000B
- Overall pressure ratio: ~40 (HP compressor ~20)
- Bypass ratio: >9
- Specific fuel consumption: ~0.52 lb/lbf/h (15 g/kN/s)

== See also ==
Related development

- WS-20
- WS-15
- WS-10

Comparable engines

- Aviadvigatel PD-14
- CFM International LEAP
- Pratt & Whitney PW1000G

Related lists

- List of aircraft engines
- List of Chinese aircraft engines
