= Shenyang WS-15 =

Chinese fighter turbofan engine

WS-15
- Type: Turbofan
- National origin: People's Republic of China
- Manufacturer: Shenyang Liming Aircraft Engine Company
- Designer: Shenyang Aeroengine Research Institute
- First run: 2006
- Major applications: Chengdu J-20
- Status: Initial production

The Shenyang WS-15 (Chinese: 涡扇-15; pinyin: Wōshàn-15), codename Emei, is a Chinese afterburning turbofan engine designed by the Shenyang Aeroengine Research Institute and manufactured by the Shenyang Liming Aircraft Engine Company.

The WS-15 is intended to become the main engine of the Chengdu J-20 stealth aircraft, enabling it to supercruise, improve its range, manoeuvrability and upgrade potential for future weapon systems. It will eventually replace the Shenyang WS-10, which currently serves as the interim engine of J-20.

== Development ==
Development of the WS-15 afterburning turbofan engine began in the early 1990s. In 2005, the engine performed successfully on the testbed. An image of the core appeared at 2006 China International Aviation & Aerospace Exhibition.

In March 2022, Chinese state media reported that the J-20 had performed trials with the engine and experienced significantly improved performance.

In December 2022, Chinese military analysts indicated the WS-15 was undertaking the last stage of testing and development. Chinese sources suggested the engine completed its maiden flight earlier that year on an unknown airframe. In late December 2022, a prototype of the new J-20 variant was observed at Chengdu Aerospace Corporation facilities. The new variant was painted in yellow primer and different from previous J-20 aircraft in airframe and was speculated to be used to test the WS-15 engine and thrust-vectoring.

In March 2023, the executive of Aero Engine Corporation of China (AECC) announced that the serial production of the WS-15 had started and that China had "[tackled] all technical bottlenecks" with the WS-15. FlightGlobal speculated that small-scale production run and in-flight testing with the J-20 fighter was underway. In April 2023, China reported that the WS-15 was ready for mass production.

On 29 June 2023, a J-20B equipped with dual WS-15 engines was speculated to have made its maiden flight in Chengdu. Though there were no clear pictures, circumstantial evidence, such as a photo of the engine installation ceremony, lack of censorship by the authorities, as well as a modified airframe, suggested WS-15 engines were evidently mounted on a plane. Janes, however, noted the engines being tested apparently lacked the thrust vectoring control (TVC) paddles, which might be added later.

== Design ==
The WS-15 is an afterburning turbofan engine. In 2009, a prototype achieved 160 kilonewtons (36,000 lb_{f}) and a thrust-to-weight ratio of 9. The WS-15 is expected to provide a thrust of 18,143 kg (40,000 pounds) and a supercruise capability; supercruise means that a plane can fly supersonic without having to use the afterburners.

In 2023, defense analysts and commentators noted that the WS-15 engine was intended to be the ultimate engine for the J-20, providing supercruise capability, enhanced reliability, improved maneuverability, better fuel efficiency and longer ranges, extra electricity production, and upgrade potential for the fighter. Spanning several decades of development, the induction of the WS-15 into the Chinese military was seen as a technological leap in China's domestic aviation industry.

Guizhou incorporated many of the same technologies as on the WS-15 to develop the WS-19, a 10-ton thrust engine with the same footprint as the earlier Guizhou WS-13.

== Operational history ==
The earliest reports claiming that J-20 airplanes had been spotted flying with the WS-15 engine were published in March 2022. In September 2024 it remained unclear whether China would retrofit all or only some of its J-20 planes with the WS-15, or only fit future production models with the new engine.

== Specifications ==
Data from School of Mechanical Engineering, Shandong University

==== General characteristics ====
- Type: Afterburning turbofan
- Length: 5.05 m (199 in)
- Diameter: 1.02 m (40 in)
- Dry weight: 1,600 kg (3,500 lb)

==== Components ====
- Compressor: axial flow
- Combustors: nickel alloy annular combustion chamber
- Turbine: single-stage high pressure, single-stage low pressure

==== Performance ====
- Maximum thrust: 161.86–180 kN (36,390–40,470 lbf)
- Overall pressure ratio: 25-26
- Bypass ratio: 0.25
- Turbine inlet temperature: 1,850 K (1,580 °C; 2,870 °F)
- Thrust-to-weight ratio: >10

== See also ==
- Shenyang WS-10
- Guizhou WS-19
- Shenyang WS-20
- CJ-1000A
- List of aircraft engines
- List of Chinese aircraft engines

Comparable engines

- Pratt & Whitney F119
- Saturn AL-51
- General Electric YF120
- IHI Corporation XF9
