= List of Chinese aircraft engines =

Aircraft engines produced by the People's Republic of China. Most of the engines listed are produced by the Aero Engine Corporation of China (AECC).

Common abbreviations
Abbreviation	Pinyin	English
WJ	Wojiang	Turboprop
WP	Wopen	Turbojet
WS	Woshan	Turbofan
WZ	Wozhou	Turboshaft

== Pistons ==
Designation	Used by	Remarks
HS-5	Nanchang Y-5	A version of the Shvetsov ASh-62, which itself was a modified version of the Wright R-1820. Built by the Zhuzhou Aeroengine Factory (ZEF), which is now the South Motive Power and Machinery Complex (SMPMC).
HS-6	Nanchang CJ-6, Harbin Y-11	Licensed copy of the Soviet Ivchenko AI-14R engine. Built by the Zhuzhou Aeroengine Factory (ZEF). Chinese development resulted in many variants (-6A, -6B, -6C, -6D, -6E, -6K).
HS-7	Harbin Z-5	Licensed copy of the Soviet Shvetsov ASh-82V engine, which originated in the Wright R-1820. Built by Dongan Engine Manufacturing Company (aka Harbin Engine Factory).
HS-8		A modified version of the Dongan HS-7 which "combined the main body and supercharger of the HS-7 with the reduction gear and propeller drive of the Shvetsov ASh-82T". Built by Dongan Engine Manufacturing Company (aka Harbin Engine Factory).

== Turboprops ==
Designation	Used by	Remarks
WJ-5	Xian Y-7	A Turboprop engine based on the Ivchenko AI-24, built by the Dongan Engine Manufacturing Company (Harbin Engine Factory) in several variants.
WJ-6	Shaanxi Y-8, AVIC AG600	Reverse engineered Ivchenko AI-20K
AEP-20		Turboprop engine prototype. Developed as a low-cost alternative to piston engines.

== Turboshafts ==
Designation	Used by	Remarks
WZ-5		Turboshaft version of the WJ-5 intended for the Harbin/CHDRI Z-6.
WZ-6	Harbin Z-8	License-built copy of the Turbomeca Turmo.
WZ-8	Harbin Z-9, Harbin Z-19	Originally license-built copies of the Turbomeca Arriel turboshaft, many modified variants of this engine were made.
WZ-9	CAIC Z-10	
WZ-9C	CAIC Z-10	Upgraded turboshaft engine
WZ-10	Harbin Z-20	
WZ-16	CAIC Z-10, Avicopter AC352	New turboshaft engine under development for the Z-10 and Z-15 helicopter based on Turbomeca Ardidan 3.

== Turbojets ==
Designation	Used by	Remarks
FW41-B	YJ-63 cruise missile	
PF-1	Shenyang JJ-1 (cancelled)	A small turbojet engine based on the WP-5, which was a copy of the Soviet Klimov VK-1F.
WP-5	Shenyang J-5, Harbin H-5	A licensed copy of Soviet Klimov VK-1 turbojet, which was derived from the Rolls-Royce Nene engine. Built at the Shenyang Liming Aircraft Engine Company.
WP-5D	Shenyang JJ-5 trainer	Produced by Xi'an (XAE)
WP-6	Shenyang J-6, Nanchang Q-5	Copy of Tumansky RD-9B.
WP-6A	Shenyang J-6 III, Nanchang Q-5	Improved WP-6
WP-6B	Nanchang J-12	
WP-6Z		Cancelled. Intended for the Nanchang J-12 and Nanchang Q-6.
WP-7	Chengdu J-7	Copy of the Tumansky R-11.
WP-7A	Shenyang J-8	
WP-7B	Shenyang J-8	
WP-8	Xian H-6	Copy of Mikulin AM-3
WP-11	HY-4 anti-ship missile	Reverse-engineered Teledyne-Ryan J69-T-41A.
WP-13	Chengdu J-7 III	Domestic engine "comparable" to the Tumansky R-13-300
WP-13A-II	Shenyang J-8II	
WP-13F	Chengdu J-7E, JL-9	
WP-14	Shenyang J-8III	
WP-14C	Chengdu J-7, Shenyang J-8T, Guizhou JL-9	Improved WP-14
WP-15	Shenyang J-13 (cancelled)	Based on the Soviet Tumansky R-29-300 turbojet engine.

== Turbofans ==
Designation	Used by	Remarks
WS-5	Harbin H-5 (testbed)	Cancelled; turbofan modification of WP-6
WS-6	Chengdu J-9, Shenyang J-13, Nanchang Q-6	Cancelled
WS-6A		Cancelled
WS-8		Intended for the Shanghai Y-10
WS-9	Xian JH-7, JH-7A	Licensed version of Rolls-Royce Spey RB.168 Mk 202
WS-9A		Improved WS-9; comparable to the French SNECMA M53-P2
WS-10A	Chengdu J-10, Shenyang J-11	Indigenous Thrust/Weight: 7.5 replacement for Saturn AL-31 and AL-31F.
WS-10G		Modified Taihang with Thrust/Weight: 9. Never been used.
WS-11	Hongdu L-11	Licensed version of the AI-25TLK
WS-12		Cancelled
WS-13	CAC/PAC JF-17, Hongdu GJ-11, CASC CH-7	9 ton thrust. Indigenous Thrust/Weight: 7.8 upgrade for RD-93
WS-15	Chengdu J-20	Described by Russian sources as the "16-ton" thrust, T/W: 9-10 project. Under development for use by Chengdu J-20.
WS-17	Hongdu L-15	Medium Thrust-Turbofan
WS-19	J-35	10 ton thrust Under development for use by J-35 fighters.
WS-21	J-35	Upgrade of the WS-13, currently used as interim powerplant for J-35 fighters.
Jiuzhai		
F406		600 kg thrust. Testflight May 2026.

== High bypass turbofans ==
Designation	Used by	Remarks
WS-13A		High-bypass turbofan. Designed to be used by the Comac C909.
WS-18		Derivative or copy of Soloviev D-30KP-2 for Xian H-6K and Xian Y-20. May be superseded by WS-20.
WS-20	Xian Y-20	A high-bypass turbofan based on the core of the low-bypass turbofan WS-10A. Undergoing flight test on Y-20 and Il-76. Designed to be used by Comac C919 and Comac C929 but still currently in testing.
SF-A		A high-bypass turbofan derived from the WS-10 core. Designed to be used by the Comac C919.
CJ-1000A		A high-bypass turbofan derived from the WS-20. Designed to be used by the Comac C919.
CJ-2000		A high-bypass turbofan. Designed to be used by the Chengdu P80, Comac C929.
CJ-500		Medium Thrust-Turbofan Designed to be used by the Comac C909.

== See also ==
- Aero Engine Corporation of China

== Sources ==
- Gordon, Yefim; Komissarov, Dmitry (2008). Chinese Aircraft: China's aviation industry since 1951. Manchester: Hikoki Publications. ISBN 978-1-902109-04-6.
- Gormley, Dennis M.; Erickson, Andrew S.; Yuan, Jingdong (2014). A Low-Visibility Force Multiplier: Assessing China's Cruise Missile Ambitions (PDF) (Report). Washington, D.C.: National Defense University Press.
- Wood, Peter; Wahlstrom, Alden; Cliff, Roger (March 2020). China's Aeroengine Industry (PDF). United States Air Force Air University China Aerospace Studies Institute. ISBN 9798637786664.
