= Factory No. 112 =

Factory No. 112 may refer to:

- Krasnoye Sormovo Factory No. 112, Russia
- Shenyang Aircraft Corporation, China, originally 112 Factory
