= Xi'an KJ-3000 =

Chinese military aircraft

The Xi'an KJ-3000 (Chinese: 空警-3000; pinyin: Kōngjǐng Sānqiān; lit. 'Airwarning-3000') is a Chinese quadjet high-wing military aircraft designed for the airborne early warning and control (AEW&C), communication intelligence (COMINT), electronic intelligence (ELINT) missions. Developed by the Xi'an Aircraft Industrial Corporation, it is based on the Xi'an Y-20B military transport aircraft platform, modified to incorporate an air-refueling probe, indigenous Shenyang WS-20 high-bypass turbofan engines, and new-generation avionics and air surveillance radar suite, featuring active electronically scanned array (AESA) radars. The KJ-3000 is part of the new generation Chinese AEW&C systems, alongside the KJ-600 and KJ-700.

== History and development ==
In 2013, Chinese media began reporting on the development of the KJ-3000, a replacement for the Shaanxi KJ-2000 airborne early warning and control (AEW&C) aircraft. In 2016, Chinese media speculated that Xi'an Y-20 will be used as the platform for the new AEW&C aircraft. In 2019, the chief designer of the Y-20, Tang Changhong, suggested the Y-20 as possible basis for the KJ-3000.

The KJ-3000 was first spotted flight testing on 27 December 2024. The flying aircraft was a Y-20B with WS-20 engines, recently inducted with the People's Liberation Army Air Force (PLAAF), and modified with a dorsal radome. Analysts observed a thick line dividing the radome, suggesting it likely rotates and hosts two active electronically scanned array (AESA) radars.

New KJ-3000 prototypes were spotted in March and May 2025. Two prototypes, number 7821 and 7822, were observed in 2026.

== Design ==
The KJ-3000 is based on the Xi'an Y-20B transport aircraft airframe, featuring the indigenously developed and built Shenyang WS-20 turbofan engines, an in-flight refueling probe, a new top-mounted radome containing a pair of active electronically scanned array (AESA) radars, communication intelligence (COMINT) antennas, electronic intelligence (ELINT) antennas, and satellite communication systems. New panels hosting datalinks and other electronic detection systems are fitted around the aircraft fuselage.

The KJ-3000 features more efficient WS-20 engines and aerial refueling capabilities, which would offer improved range, endurance, and a higher operational altitude compared to its predecessors. The new engines also provide superior electrical generation capability. An intake at the base on the tailfin provides cooling air for the electronics.

Unlike China's previous KJ-500 and KJ-2000, both of which featured fixed radomes with three AESA arrays, the KJ-3000 features a rotating radome design with two AESA arrays. The KJ-3000 is equipped with an infrared search and track (IRST) sensor, allowing the aircraft to detect thermal signatures, which would be useful against stealth aircraft with low radar cross-section (RCS) or in contested environments where radars are jammed.

== Operational history ==
In October 2026, satellite intelligence indicated that KJ-3000 entered serial production. According to the Pentagon annual report on the Chinese military, the KJ-3000 is possiblely "the world's first model to use digital radar and will be capable of anti-jamming, passive detection, and target identification".

== Operators ==
People's Republic of China

- People's Liberation Army Air Force

== See also ==
- KJ-500
- KJ-2000

Related development

- Xi'an Y-20

Aircraft of comparable role, configuration, and era

- Boeing E-3 Sentry
- Boeing E-7 Wedgetail
- EL/W-2090
- GlobalEye

Related lists

- List of AEW&C aircraft
- List of aircraft produced by the People's Republic of China
