= CFM International LEAP =

Franco-American turbofan aircraft engine, successor to CFM56

LEAP

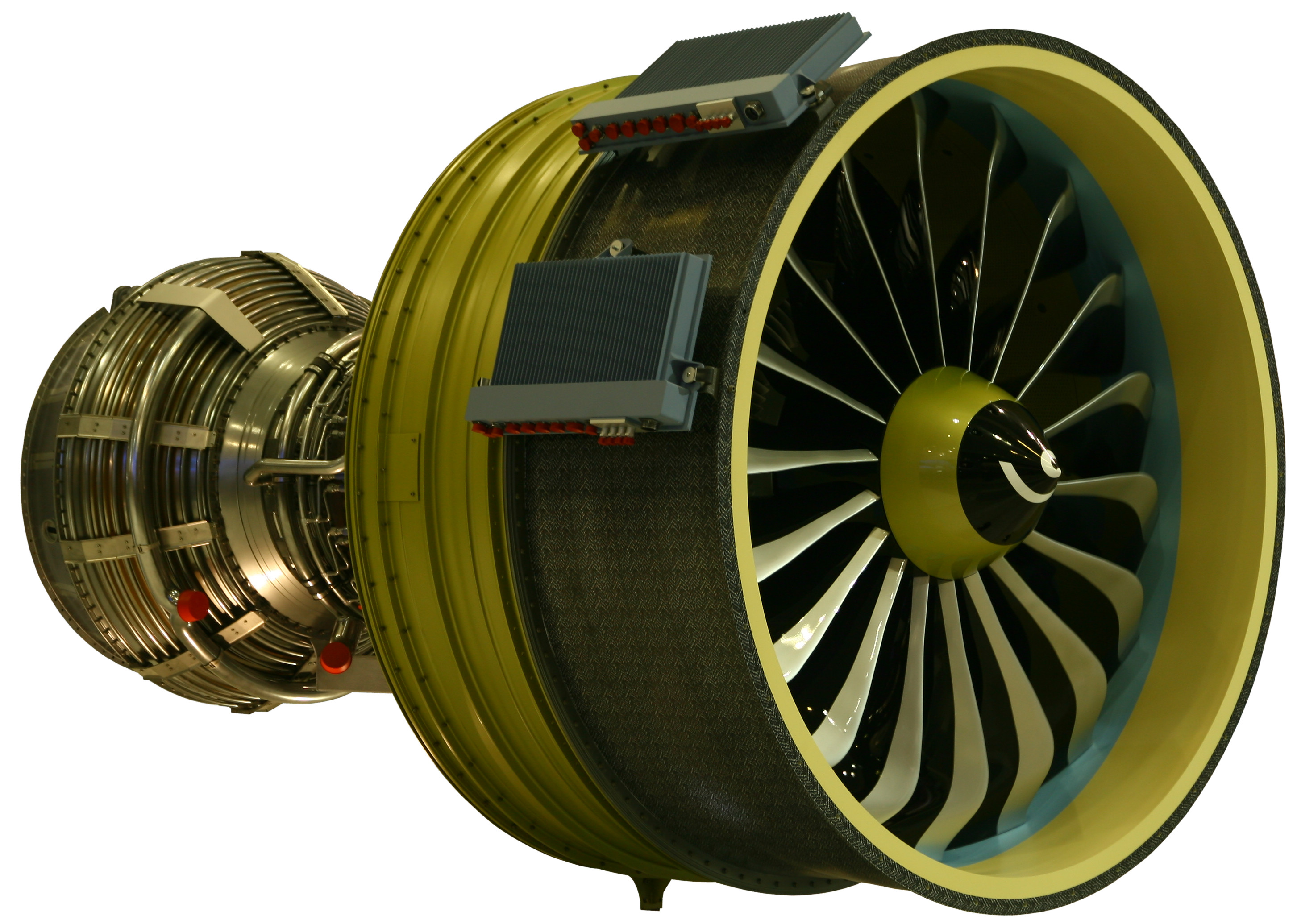
- Mockup of a LEAP-X, the early code name of the engine
- Type: Turbofan
- National origin: France/United States
- Manufacturer: CFM International
- First run: 4 September 2013
- Major applications: Airbus A320neo family; Boeing 737 MAX; Comac C919
- Number built: 2,516 (June 2019) (Note: 77 delivered in 2016, 460 in 2017, 1,118 in 2018, 861 in H1 2019.)
- Developed from: CFM International CFM56; General Electric GE90; General Electric GEnx
- Developed into: General Electric Passport

The CFM International LEAP ("Leading Edge Aviation Propulsion") is a high-bypass turbofan engine produced by CFM International, a 50–50 joint venture between the American GE Aerospace and the French Safran Aircraft Engines. It competes with the Pratt & Whitney PW1000G for narrow-body aircraft.

== Design ==
The LEAP uses 15% less fuel and produces 15% less CO₂ compared to the CFM56. It uses a scaled-down version of the low-pressure turbine used on the General Electric GEnx engine. The fan blades are made of composite materials using a resin transfer molding process and untwist under aerodynamic and centrifugal loads to maintain aerodynamic efficiency.

Although designed with a higher overall pressure ratio than the CFM56, the engine operating limit is lower to improve durability and service life. It uses a higher proportion of composite materials, features the second-generation Twin Annular Pre-mixing Swirler (TAPS II) combustor, and has a bypass ratio of approximately 10:1 to 11:1. The high-pressure compressor has a pressure ratio of 22:1, approximately double that of the CFM56. The turbine shrouds, made from ceramic matrix composites (CMCs), are lighter than those on the CFM56.

The LEAP incorporates an eductor-based oil cooling system, derived from the GEnx design. This system includes oil coolers mounted on the fan duct and uses a venturi effect to maintain oil pressure within the internal sump. Additionally, the LEAP includes some of the first FAA-certified 3D-printed components used in a commercial jet engine.

The LEAP-1C variant, developed for the Chinese-built Comac C919, reportedly omits some of the advanced technologies found in other LEAP models. According to industry sources, this decision was influenced by concerns that the technology could be stolen and put into the CJ-1000A engine being developed by another state-owned manufacturer, the Aero Engine Corporation of China. Some analysts have described the LEAP-1C as more closely related in capability to an upgraded CFM56 than to other LEAP variants.

== Development ==
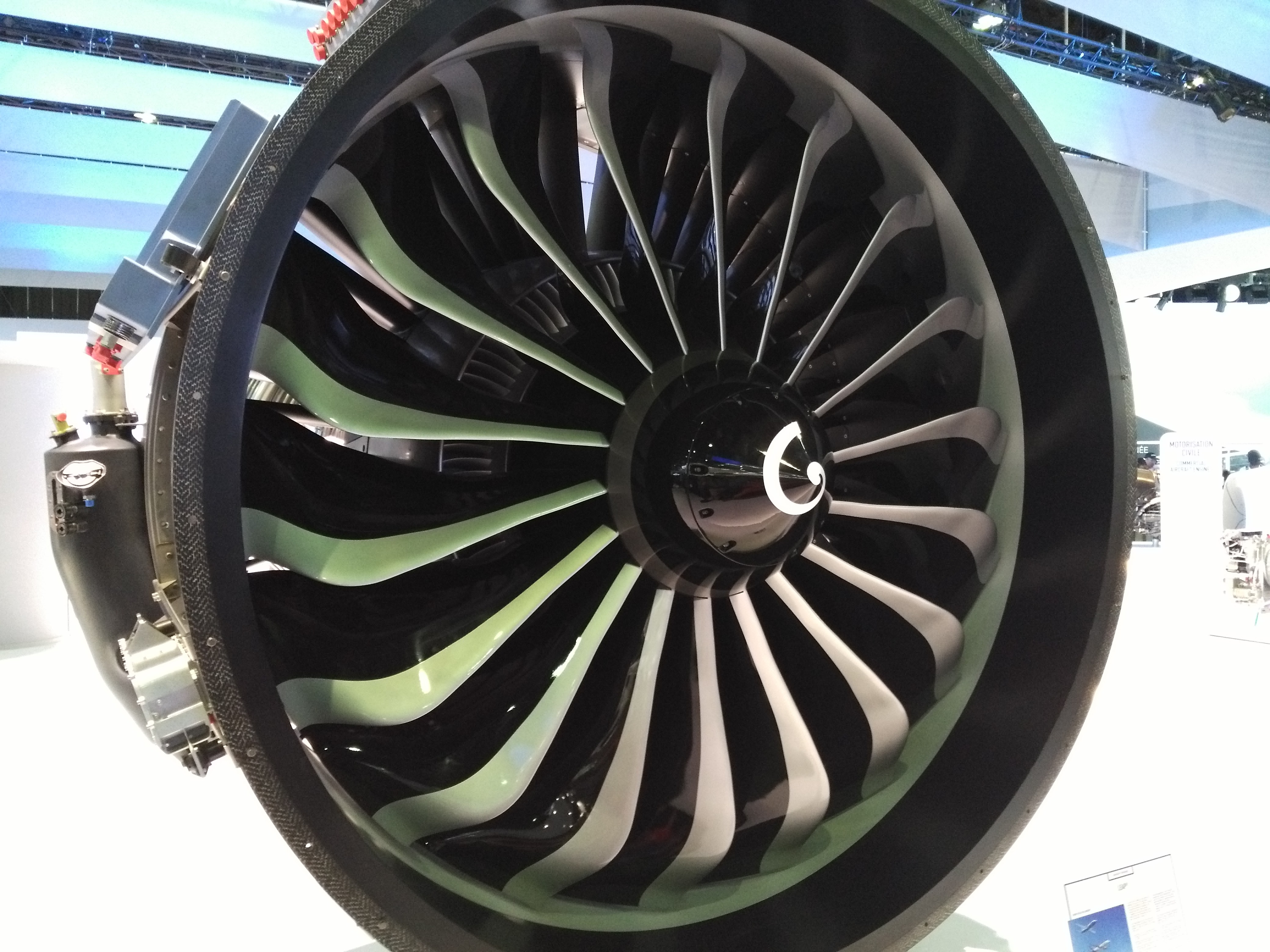
18 blade fan

The LEAP incorporates technologies that CFM developed as part of the LEAP56 technology acquisition program, which CFM launched in 2005. The engine was launched as LEAP-X on 13 July 2008, intended as a successor to the CFM56.

In 2009, COMAC selected the LEAP engine for the C919. 28 development engines were used by CFM to achieve engine certification, and 32 more used by Airbus, Boeing and COMAC for aircraft certification and other test programs.

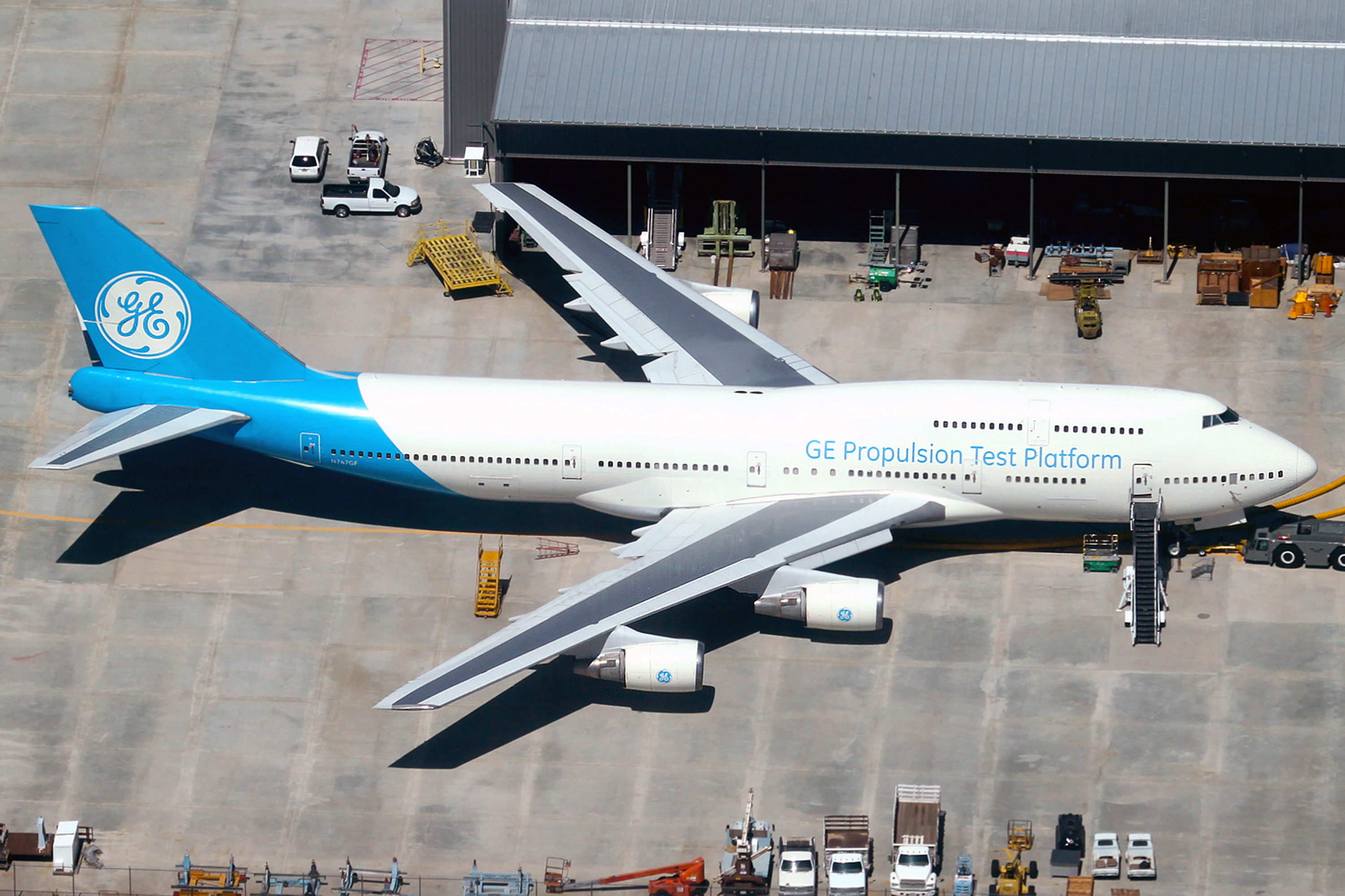
The LEAP-1A was tested on GE's 747-400 flying testbed.

CFM carried out the first test flight of a LEAP-1C in Victorville, California, with the engine mounted on the company Boeing 747 flying testbed aircraft on 6 October 2014. The -1C version has a thrust reverser with a one-piece O-Duct replacing the more usual two-piece D-Duct. There are no drag links for the blocker doors giving a smoother flowpath for the fan air.

It obtained its 180-minute ETOPS approval from the U.S. Federal Aviation Administration and the European Aviation Safety Agency on 19 June 2017.

=== Orders ===
On 20 July 2011, American Airlines announced that it planned to purchase 100 Boeing 737 aircraft featuring the LEAP-1B engine. The project was approved by Boeing on 30 August 2011, as the Boeing 737 MAX. Southwest Airlines was the launch customer of the 737 MAX with a firm order of 150 aircraft.

The list price was US$14.5 million for a LEAP-1A, and US$14.5 million for a LEAP-1B.

CFM International were offering rate-per-flight-hour support agreements (also known as "power by the hour" agreements) for the engine. For a LEAP-1A engine, costs were around US$3,039 per engine, per day, compared to US$1,852 per engine, per day for the prior-generation CFM56.

In 2016, CFM booked 1,801 orders, and the LEAP backlog stood at more than 12,200, worth more than US$170 billion at list price.

By July 2018, the LEAP had an eight-year backlog with 16,300 sales. At that time, more LEAPs were produced in the five years it was on sale than CFM56s in 25 years. It is the second-most ordered jet engine behind the 44-year-old CFM56, which achieved 35,500 orders. Also, on the A320neo, where the engine was competing with the Pratt & Whitney PW1000G, the LEAP had captured a 59% market share in July 2018. By comparison, the CFM56 had a 60% share of the prior-generation A320ceo market.

In 2020, GE Aviation reported that CFM had lost 1,900 orders for LEAP engines worth US$13.9 billion (US$7.3 million each), reducing the backlog value to US$259 billion. More than 1,000 cancellations came from Boeing 737 MAX orders being canceled among the Boeing 737 MAX groundings, while the remainder came from the impact of the COVID-19 pandemic on aviation.

In May 2025, the United States Department of Commerce paused the export of LEAP engines to COMAC. The restrictions were lifted in July 2025 amid de-escalating U.S.-China trade tensions, with the U.S. permitting GE Aerospace to restart shipments.

=== Production ===
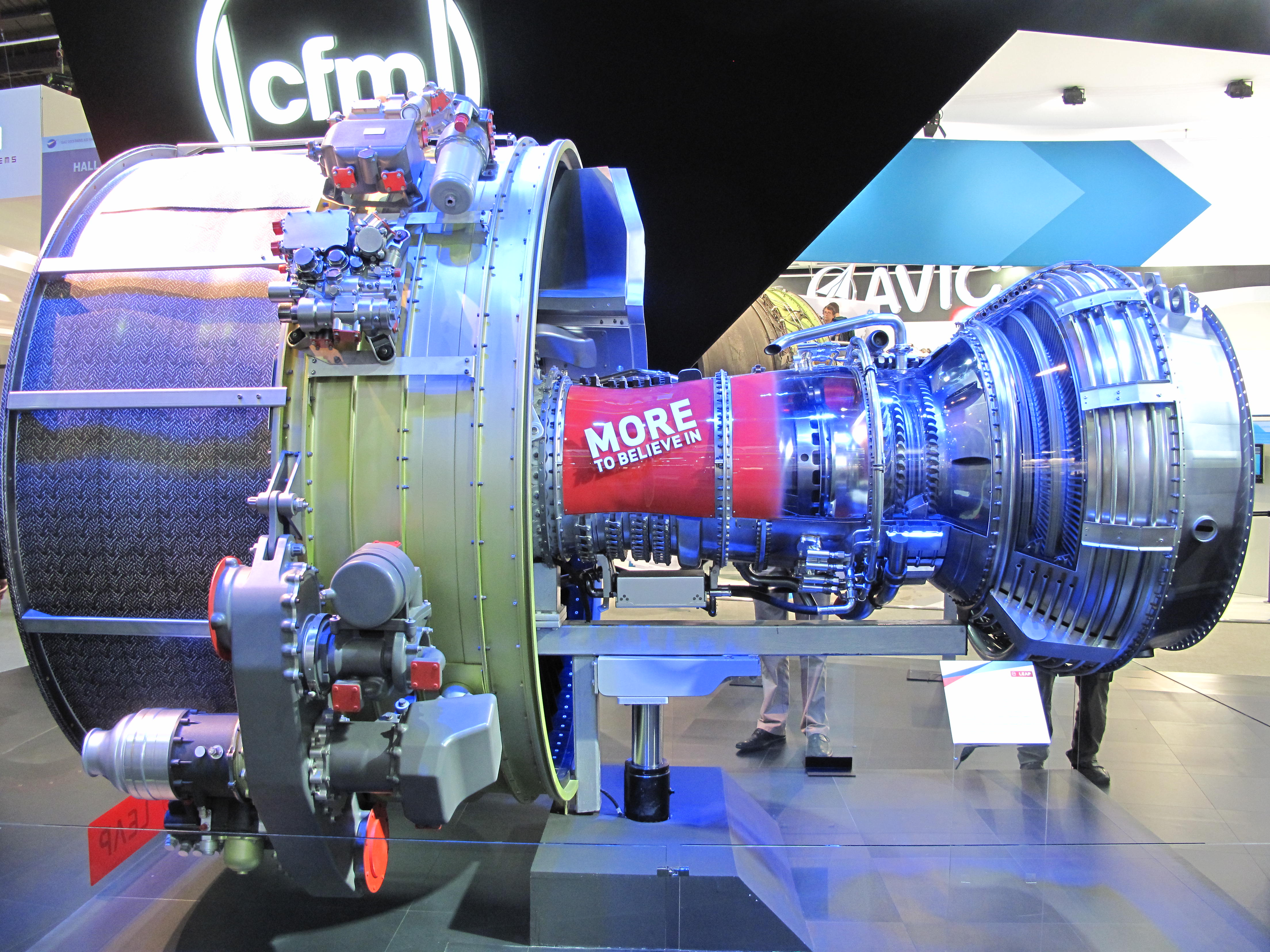
side view with cutaways

In 2016, the engine was introduced in August on the Airbus A320neo with Pegasus Airlines and CFM delivered 77 LEAP. With the 737 MAX introduction, CFM delivered 257 LEAPs in the first three quarters of 2017, including 110 in the third: 49 to Airbus and 61 to Boeing, and targets 450 in the year. CFM was to produce 1,200 engines in 2018, 1,900 in 2019, and 2,100 in 2020. This is compared to the 1,700 CFM56 produced in 2016.

To cope with the demand, CFM duplicated supply sources on 80% of parts and subdivided assembly sites, already shared between GE and Safran. GE assembles LEAP engines in Lafayette, Indiana, in addition to its existing Durham, North Carolina, facility. As more than 75% of the engine comes from suppliers, critical parts suppliers pass “run-rate stress tests” lasting two to 12 weeks. Pratt & Whitney suffered delays in receiving parts to an accelerated schedule on its competing PW1100G geared turbofan, including shortages for its aluminium-titanium fan blade, which affected Airbus A320neo and Bombardier CSeries deliveries. Safran assembles LEAP engines in Villaroche, France, and Safran and GE each assemble half of the annual volume.

In 2018, 1,118 engines were delivered.

Over the first half of 2019, CFM revenues were up by 23% to €5.9 billion with 1,119 engine deliveries; declining sales of CFM56 (258 sold), more than offset by LEAP (861 sold). Recurring operating income rose by 34% to €1.2 billion, but was reduced by €107 million (US$118 million) due to the negative margins and initial costs of LEAP production, before a positive contribution expected in the second half. Revenues were expected to grow by 15% in 2019 but free cash flow depended on the return to service of the grounded 737 MAX.

In 2019, LEAP production rose to 1,736 engines, and orders and commitments reached 1,968 amid the 737 MAX groundings, compared with 3,211 for 2018, for a stable backlog of 15,614 (compared to 15,620). CFM expected to produce 1,400 LEAP engines in 2020, including an average of 10 weekly LEAP-1Bs for the Boeing 737 Max. By March 2022, CFM intended to output 2,000 engines in 2023, up from 845 deliveries in 2021. In 2023, CFM booked over 2,500 orders, resulting in a backlog of 10,675, delivered 1,570 Leap engines, up by 38% from 1,136 in 2022, and was expecting 20-25% more deliveries for 2024.

The troubled introduction of the Pratt & Whitney PW1100G on the A320neo motivated customers to choose LEAP engines. LEAP market share rose from 55% to 60% in 2016, but orders for 1,523 aircraft (29%) had not specified which engine would be chosen. From January through early August 2017, 39 PW1100G engines versus 396 CFM LEAP engines were chosen. By 2024, the LEAP was selected for 75% of the A320neo orders. As an example of PW1100G reliability issues, 9% of LEAP-powered A320neos were out of service for at least one week in July 2017, compared with 46% of those using the PW1100G.

A contract for the production of components for the low-pressure turbine of the LEAP engine was signed on February 12, 2025, between Safran Aircraft Engines and India's Titan Engineering and Automation Limited. Manufacturing will start from 2026. An additional agreement was signed for manufacturing turbine forged parts with Hindustan Aeronautics Limited.

=== Operations ===
The Boeing 737 MAX LEAP-1B started revenue service in May 2017 with Malindo Air with 8 hours of daily operation, while the A320neo LEAP-1A surpassed 10 hours per day by July.

In October 2017, an exhaust gas temperature shift was noticed during a flight and a CMC shroud coating in the high-pressure turbine was seen flaking off in a borescope inspection. This caused more hot gas leakage past the turbine than normal. A design change was required to the coating.

== Applications ==
CFM International LEAP variants
Model	Application	Thrust range	Introduction
-1A	Airbus A320neo family	24,500–35,000 lbf (109–156 kN)	2 August 2016
-1B	Boeing 737 MAX	23,000–29,000 lbf (100–130 kN)	22 May 2017
-1C	Comac C919	27,980–30,000 lbf (124.5–133.4 kN)	28 May 2023

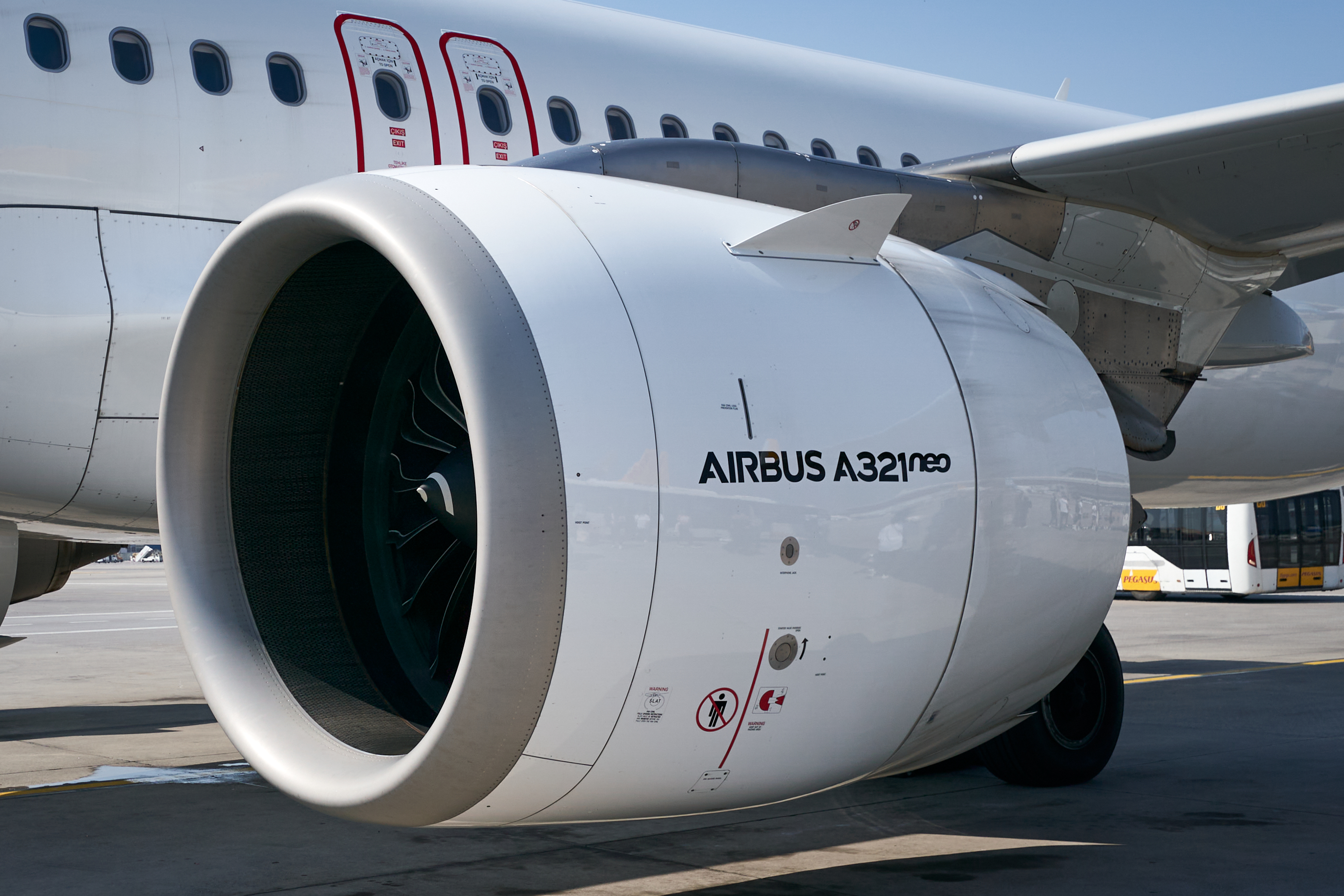
The LEAP-1A is one of two engine options on the Airbus A320neo family.

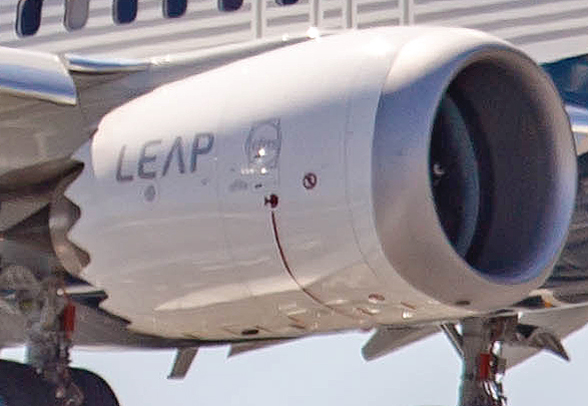
The LEAP-1B is the exclusive engine option for the Boeing 737 MAX.

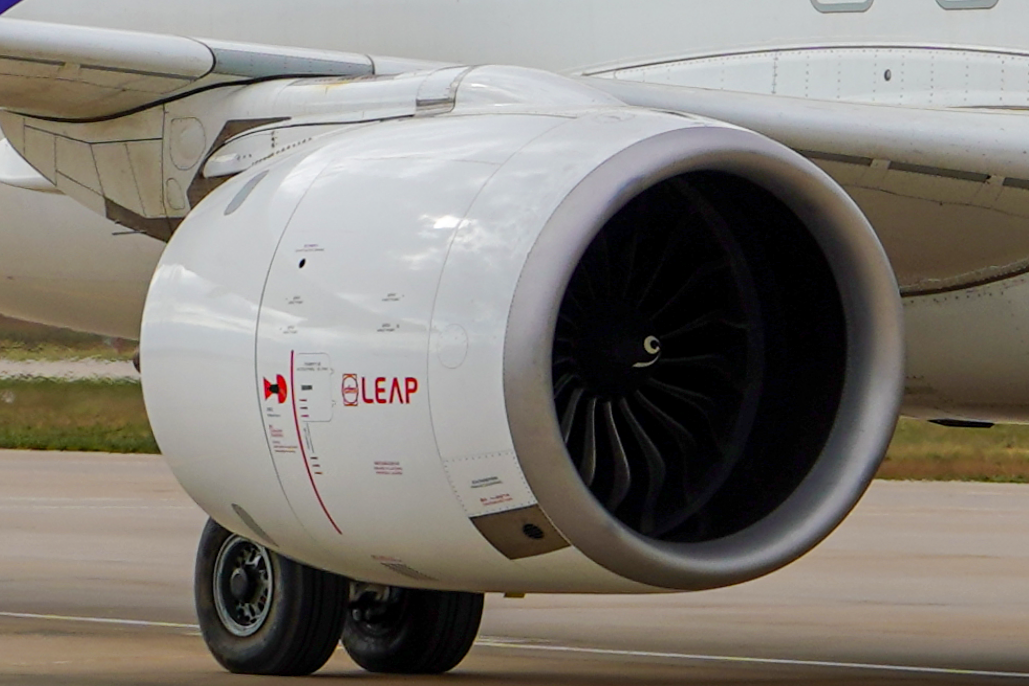
The LEAP-1C is currently the exclusive engine option for the Comac C919.

== Specifications ==
Model	LEAP-1A	LEAP-1B	LEAP-1C
Configuration	Twin-spool, high bypass turbofan		
Compressor	1 fan, 3-stage LP, 10-stage HP		
Combustor	TAPS II (Twin-Annular, Pre-mixing Swirler second-generation)		
Turbine	2-stage HP, 7-stage LP	2-stage HP, 5-stage LP	2-stage HP, 7-stage LP
Overall pressure ratio	40:1 (50:1 at top of climb)		
TSFC at cruise	0.51 lb/lbf/h (14.4 g/kN/s)	0.53 lb/lbf/h (15.0 g/kN/s)	0.51 lb/lbf/h (14.4 g/kN/s)
Fan diameter	78 in (198 cm)	69.4 in (176 cm)	77 in (196 cm)
Bypass ratio	11:1	9:1	11:1
Length	3.328 m (131.0 in) (Note: fan case forward flange to turbine rear frame aft flange)	3.147 m (123.9 in)	4.505 m (177.4 in) (Note: fan cowl hinge beam front to centre vent tube end)
Max. width	2.543 m (100.1 in)	2.421 m (95.3 in)	2.659 m (104.7 in)
Max. height	2.362 m (93.0 in)	2.256 m (88.8 in)	2.714 m (106.9 in)
Max. weight	3,153 kg (6,951 lb) (Wet)	2,780 kg (6,130 lb) (Dry)	3,935 kg (8,675 lb) (Wet)
Max. take-off thrust	143.05 kN (32,160 lb_{f})	130.41 kN (29,320 lb_{f})	137.14 kN (30,830 lb_{f})
Max. continuous thrust	140.96 kN (31,690 lb_{f})	127.62 kN (28,690 lb_{f})	133.22 kN (29,950 lb_{f})
Max. rpm	HP: 19,391; LP: 3,894	HP: 20,171; LP: 4,586	HP: 19,391; LP: 3,894

Thrust ratings
Variant	Take-off	Max. continuous	Application	Configuration
-1A23	106.80 kN (24,010 lb_{f})	104.58 kN (23,510 lb_{f})	—N/a	
-1A24	106.80 kN (24,010 lb_{f})	106.76 kN (24,000 lb_{f})	Airbus A319neo (A319-151N), Airbus A320neo (A320-252N)	
-1A24E1	106.80 kN (24,010 lb_{f})	106.76 kN (24,000 lb_{f})		Hot & High
-1A26	120.64 kN (27,120 lb_{f})	118.68 kN (26,680 lb_{f})	Airbus A319neo (A319-153N), Airbus A320neo (A320-251N)	
-1A26CJ	120.64 kN (27,120 lb_{f})	118.68 kN (26,680 lb_{f})	Airbus ACJ319neo	
-1A26E1	120.64 kN (27,120 lb_{f})	118.68 kN (26,680 lb_{f})		Hot & High
-1A26S	120.64 kN (27,120 lb_{f})	118.68 kN (26,680 lb_{f})		
-1A26E1S	120.64 kN (27,120 lb_{f})	118.68 kN (26,680 lb_{f})		Hot & High
-1A26E2	120.64 kN (27,120 lb_{f})	115.83 kN (26,040 lb_{f})		Hot & High
-1A29	130.29 kN (29,290 lb_{f})	118.68 kN (26,680 lb_{f})	Airbus A320neo (A320-253N)	
-1A29CJ	130.29 kN (29,290 lb_{f})	118.68 kN (26,680 lb_{f})	Airbus ACJ320neo	
-1A30	143.05 kN (32,160 lb_{f})	140.96 kN (31,690 lb_{f})	Airbus A321neo (A321-252N), (A321-252NX)	
-1A30R	143.05 kN (32,160 lb_{f})	110.54 kN (24,850 lb_{f})	Airbus A321neo (A321-252N), (A321-252NX)	
-1A30S	143.05 kN (32,160 lb_{f})	140.96 kN (31,690 lb_{f})	Airbus A321neo (A321-252N), (A321-252NX)	
-1A30RS	143.05 kN (32,160 lb_{f})	110.54 kN (24,850 lb_{f})	Airbus A321neo (A321-252N), (A321-252NX)	
-1A32	143.05 kN (32,160 lb_{f})	140.96 kN (31,690 lb_{f})	Airbus A321neo (A321-251N), (A321-251NX)	
-1A32R	143.05 kN (32,160 lb_{f})	110.54 kN (24,850 lb_{f})	Airbus A321neo (A321-251N), (A321-251NX)	
-1A32S	143.05 kN (32,160 lb_{f})	140.96 kN (31,690 lb_{f})	Airbus A321neo (A321-251N), (A321-251NX)	
-1A32RS	143.05 kN (32,160 lb_{f})	110.54 kN (24,850 lb_{f})	Airbus A321neo (A321-251N), (A321-251NX)	
-1A32B2R	143.05 kN (32,160 lb_{f})	110.54 kN (24,850 lb_{f})	Airbus A321neo (A321-251N), (A321-251NX)	Take-off Bump
-1A32X	143.05 kN (32,160 lb_{f})	110.54 kN (24,850 lb_{f})	—N/a	
-1A33	143.05 kN (32,160 lb_{f})	140.96 kN (31,690 lb_{f})	Airbus A321neo (A321-253N), (A321-253NX)	
-1A33B2	143.05 kN (32,160 lb_{f})	140.96 kN (31,690 lb_{f})	Airbus A321neo (A321-253N), (A321-253NX)	Take-off Bump
-1A33X	143.05 kN (32,160 lb_{f})	110.54 kN (24,850 lb_{f})	Airbus A321XLR (A321-253NY)	
-1A33B2X	143.05 kN (32,160 lb_{f})	110.54 kN (24,850 lb_{f})	Airbus A321XLR (A321-253NY)	Take-off Bump
-1A35A	143.05 kN (32,160 lb_{f})	140.96 kN (31,690 lb_{f})	—N/a	
-1A35AX	143.05 kN (32,160 lb_{f})	110.54 kN (24,850 lb_{f})	—N/a	
-1A35AR	143.05 kN (32,160 lb_{f})	110.54 kN (24,850 lb_{f})		
-1B25	119.15 kN (26,790 lb_{f})	115.47 kN (25,960 lb_{f})	Boeing 737 MAX 8, 737 MAX 8-200	
-1B27	124.71 kN (28,040 lb_{f})	121.31 kN (27,270 lb_{f})	Boeing 737 MAX 8, 737 MAX 8-200	
-1B28	130.41 kN (29,320 lb_{f})	127.62 kN (28,690 lb_{f})	Boeing 737 MAX 8, 737 MAX 8-200, Boeing 737 MAX 9	
-1C28	129.98 kN (29,220 lb_{f})	127.93 kN (28,760 lb_{f})	Comac C919 STD	
-1C30	137.14 kN (30,830 lb_{f})	133.22 kN (29,950 lb_{f})	Comac C919 ER	
-1C30B1	137.14 kN (30,830 lb_{f})	133.22 kN (29,950 lb_{f})	Comac C919 ER	Take-off Bump

== See also ==
Related development

- CFM International CFM56
- General Electric Passport

Comparable engines

- ACAE CJ-1000A
- Aviadvigatel PD-14
- Pratt & Whitney PW1000G

Related lists

- List of aircraft engines
