= Nanchang Q-6 =

Cancelled Chinese strike fighter aircraft

Q-6

General information
- Type: Ground-attack aircraft
- National origin: People's Republic of China
- Manufacturer: Nanchang
- Status: Development cancelled (1989)
- Primary user: PLA Air Force

The Nanchang Q-6 (Chinese: 强-6; pinyin: Qiang-6) is a cancelled ground attack aircraft of the People's Republic of China (PRC), with the Nanchang Aircraft Factory (later reorganized into Hongdu Aviation Industry Group) as the prime contractor. The project never went beyond the prototype stage, despite a prolonged development.

== Background ==
The Q-6 program was initiated in the mid-1970s when during the Battle of the Paracel Islands in 1974, the People's Liberation Army Air Force (PLAAF) and People's Liberation Army Naval Air Force (PLANAF) proved incapable of ground support missions. Although the South Vietnamese claimed that the People's Liberation Army (PLA) had bombed the South Vietnamese forces on the three disputed islands, this was in fact not true. In reality, despite the Chinese intent to do so with the deployment of 115 aircraft which flew 401 sorties in support of the battle, none of the Chinese aircraft deployed actually attacked enemy positions.

Due to the lack of modern avionics and ground infrastructure to support a modern air war, Chinese aircraft suffered navigation and other logistics problems that severely limited their performance. The first Chinese aircraft did not actually reach the islands until several hours after the battle was over. In addition to the need to upgrade its logistics capability and infrastructure, China also decided that nothing-in-its-then-aircraft-inventory could fill the requirement for support missions in the South China Sea. Fighters such as the J-5, J-6, J-7, and J-8 lacked a ground attack capability and were hampered by short range. The only Chinese ground attack aircraft Nanchang Q-5 was also short ranged and had a low payload. China's bombers such as the Harbin H-5 and Xian H-6 were slow and lacked a self-defense capability. A new aircraft was therefore seen as desperately needed to fulfill a new naval strike mission in support of the People's Liberation Army Navy (PLAN).

Immediately after the battle, both the PLAAF and PLAN submitted their requirements for a new fighter bomber/ground attack aircraft to the 3rd Ministry of PRC. After extensive research, the 3rd Ministry decided that based on the Chinese aeronautical industrial capability at the time, it was impossible to develop two separate airplanes at the same time. Instead, a decision was made to develop a single airplane with different versions tailored to meet the different needs of PLAAF and PLAN, especially when the prime requirements of the PLAAF and PLAN were similar.

In June 1976, representatives from various aircraft factories were summoned to Beijing to discuss the project, and were instructed to come up with designs in the shortest possible time. Shenyang Aircraft Factory (later reorganized into Shenyang Aircraft Corporation) was the first to come up with a design, the JH-8 (FB-8), which was essentially a ground attack version of J-8II (F-8II). This was followed by the Q-6 a new design from the Nanchang Aircraft Factory. The Xi'an Aircraft Factory (later reorganized into Xi'an Aircraft Industrial Corporation) was the last one to present a design, the Xian JH-7, also a new design. Initially, the 3rd Ministry favored the JH-8, however because the design of the J-8II was still not completed the risk was considered to be too high, it was eliminated. The projected development of JH-7 was too far out, and so the Q-6 was selected because it was believed to be the one that would be able for service the soonest.

== Origin ==
Before the Q-6 program started, China had already obtained MiG-23BN and MiG-23MS aircraft from Egypt, a few downed F-111 were also provided to China by North Vietnam. Based on the research effort performed on these aircraft, it was suggested that the variable-sweep wing should be adopted for the next Chinese ground attack aircraft. The general designer of Nanchang Q-5, and the future academician of the Chinese Academy of Sciences (elected in 1995), Lu Xiaopeng was named as the general designer of Q-6. Lu personally visited PLAAF and PLAN numerous times to obtain their input, which was the base of the Tactical Technological Requirements of Q-6 he was in charge of, and by February 1979, the general design of Q-6 was finalized, based on the requirement of the 3rd Ministry.

The original plan was to base the design of Q-6 on MiG-23BN, the ground attack version of MiG-23. However, both PLAAF and PLAN required dogfight capability for self-defense. Due to the need for dogfight capability, radar was necessary, but the ground attack version had no radar. As a result, the plan was changed to base the design on MiG-23MS instead. Research revealed that to successfully perform the required missions for PLAAF and PLAN, ground attack radar, as well as terrain-following radar were needed, a feature MiG-23BN lacked. For air-to-air combat, the RP-22 Sapfir-21 radar (NATO reporting name Jay Bird) of MiG-23MS lacked BVR capability. The decision was made to use avionics reverse engineered from F-111 to make up these shortcomings of the MiG-23, but as with other technological features adopted for the Q-6, they were proven to be far too ambitious for the Chinese industrial, scientific and technological capability at the time, which resulted in prolonged development and contributed to the final cancellation of the Q-6.

== Design ==
Originally the design was based on the MiG-23MS, and was initially thought to be better than the MiG-23BN, because it provided more room in the nosecone to house the radar. However the Chinese microelectronic industry could not provide the solid state electronics needed to miniaturise the intended radar, and as a result, the size of the fuselage (with the exception of length) had to be increased from the size of the MiG-23 to that of the Su-24. Research also revealed that the side-intakes of the MiG-23 design was not enough to meet the dogfight capability, so the side-intakes was changed into chin-intake instead, and Q-6 is claimed to be the first Chinese aircraft to have a chin-mounted intake.

Chinese consider the greatest achievement of Q-6 in its fly-by-wire (FBW) control of the variable-sweep wing, both were the first of its kind in China. The original goal of reverse engineering the FBW of F-111 proved to be far too ambitious and had to be abandoned, and much simpler version was adopted. The triplex analog FBW of Q-6 is just slightly more advanced the most rudimentary FBW in that it used the same principle of the most rudimentary FBW in replacing the mechanical servo valves with electrical servo valves operated by electronic controller, but contrary to the most rudimentary FBW where hydraulic actuators still existed, the hydraulic actuators are replaced by electrical actuators on Q-6. The system proved to be major obstacle in the development and it took nine years to complete (1980–1988), under the personal leadership of Lu Xiaopeng. Although hailed as a technological breakthrough for the Chinese aviation by China, and provided superior performance, the Chinese system was more than 12% heavier than the simple mechanical-hydraulic controlled variable-sweep wing of MiG-23, reducing the weapon payload, fuel capacity and combat radius, which contributed partially to the final cancellation of Q-6.

== Power plant ==
Research revealed that the turbojet engine was not sufficient to provide the thrust needed to meet the dogfight requirement, so a domestic turbofan engine originally used for Chengdu J-9 was used instead. The turbofan engine was designated as WS-6 (short for Wo Shan, 涡扇), with development first begun in 1964. After seventeen years of development, the performance parameter finally reached the desired requirement in October 1980. Although the pre-production authorization was granted in 1981, the program continued as a research project instead of a mature one for production. In addition, research revealed that the 71 kN (122 kN with afterburner) WS-6 was not enough to power Q-6 to meet the dogfight requirement. In 1983, an improved version WS-6G (G = Gai 改 meaning improved) appeared, originally intended for the cancelled Shenyang J-13. The new engine provided thrust of 138 kN (with afterburner), with thrust to weight ratio greater than seven, but due to the limitation of the Chinese industrial capability at the time, the engine was not reliable at all, and in addition to be highly unreliable due to the immature design, the MTBO of the engine was rumored to be only around fifty hours at most, and the engine never progressed beyond the research stage under laboratory conditions. The problem in the power plant caused by the limited Chinese industrial capability was another factor contributed partially to the final cancellation of Q-6.

== Avionics ==
Avionics requirement for Q-6 was one of the most advanced one for China at its time. The original goal of reverse engineering American avionics from downed F-111 provided by North Vietnam proved to be far too ambitious to achieve given the limited Chinese industrial capability at the time, so it was decided to reverse engineer whatever China could, and use the result to upgrade Soviet avionics on MiG-23. The only way to successfully meet the ground attack mission requirements of PLAAF and PLANAF was to equip Q-6 with an airborne radar with ground attack capability, a feature lacked by the RP-22 Sapfir-21 radar (NATO reporting name Jay Bird) on the MiG-23MS, which also lacked the BVR capability, intentionally eliminated by the former USSR for the early export versions of MiG-23s. During the reverse engineering effort, it was discovered that the superior American designs enabled the General Electric AN/APQ-113 attack radar to incorporate air-to-air mode with ease, even when some of the embedded software could not be fully deciphered, due to the better design theories and principles that were easier to understand. Texas Instruments AN/APQ-110 terrain-following radar (TFR) was reverse engineered, and placed in the nosecone of Q-6 in the same configuration as that of the AN/APQ-113 and AN/APQ-110 on F-111: the TFR was installed just below the attack radar.

However, due to the limitations of the Chinese microelectronic industry at the time, many of the solid state microelectronic circuitry could not be manufactured by China, so they had to be replaced by vacuum tubes that could be produced in China, resulting in much heavier radar system than similar American systems. Similar handicaps also increased the size of other avionics, greatly increased size and weight. Other avionics included radar warning receiver, laser range finder, communication and instrument landing systems. The only purely domestic avionic was the Aim (Miao, 瞄)-6 aiming sight, which had superior performance than the PBK-3 bombing sight on MiG-23. However, the navigation and attack system that the Aim-6 aiming sight was part of proved to be a technological bottleneck for the Chinese, and caused more difficulty in development. Reverse engineering the Litton Industries AN/AJQ-20 inertial navigation and attack system proved to be particularly difficult, and as with other avionics such as radars, it was not until a decade later in the late 1990s that China finally mastered these system completely. The limitations of the Chinese microelectronic industry at the time was yet another factor that contributed to the final cancellation of the Q-6. Despite these limitations, research and simulation had proved that when equipped with these avionics, the Q-6 was more than three times more effective than the Q-5. However, this was not enough to save the Q-6 from being cancelled.

== Cancellation ==
By 1989, the Chinese military was no longer interested in the variable-sweep wing and the Q-6 was considered inadequate for future conflicts. In addition to the problem of the overweight variable-sweep wing design, and already-identified avionics and engine issues, there was also the problem of Chinese industry's limited capability to produce the advanced lightweight composite material for the airframe -- a must in order to make up for the overweight variable sweep wing and avionics. This was never achieved and the advanced composite material that was supposedly used was never developed successfully even after the program was already cancelled. The most important factor, however, was stealth: the Chinese realized that a variable-sweep wing would enlarge the radar cross section of the aircraft by multiple times, becoming much more likely to be detected and shot down, thus making it impossible to survive on the modern battlefield. Coupled with difficulties mentioned earlier, the Q-6 was finally terminated in 1989. Only three models/prototypes were built: one for static test, one for avionics test on the ground, and one for the variable sweep wing research. Chinese sources have claimed that although the program was cancelled, the experience gained from it provided lessons learned necessary to help to advance the Chinese aeronautical industry.
