= WZ-10 =

WZ10 may refer to:

- Changhe Z-10, a Chinese helicopter
- Chengdu WZ-10, a Chinese unmanned aerial vehicle
- Harbin WZ-10, a Chinese turboshaft engine
