= Shenyang J-13 =

Chinese cancelled jet fighter project

J-13

General information
- Type: Air superiority fighter
- National origin: China
- Manufacturer: Shenyang Aircraft Corporation
- Designer: Shenyang Aircraft Design Institute
- Status: Project cancelled

The Shenyang J-13 (Chinese: 歼-13; traditional: 殲-13) was a long-running Chinese project by Shenyang Aircraft Corporation to develop a light-weight, single engine fighter aircraft, which was ultimately cancelled. The project began in 1971 to develop a replacement for the Shenyang J-6 and was abandoned in the early 1990s due to the success of the Chengdu J-10.

== Development ==
As early as 1971, Shenyang Aircraft Corporation's 601 Institute had been designing a replacement for the People's Liberation Army Air Force's (PLAAF) aging fleet of Shenyang J-6 fighter jets (the Shenyang J-6 was a copy of the Soviet Mikoyan-Gurevich MiG-19 'Farmer'). By 1973 airframes were being tested for their aerodynamic configuration through a wind tunnel. In 1974, the PLAAF formally proposed the development of a replacement for the Shenyang J-6 for the 1980s by a light-weight air-superiority fighter aircraft capable of achieving speeds of up to Mach 2.0. In the same year, testing was done on twenty different wing configurations. In 1976, testing on the material and the selection of electronics and avionic equipment to be used for the airframe were undertaken. Seven different airframes were tested in total. As progress on the airframe continued, a constant problem that had arisen in similar Chinese fighter aircraft projects, such as the Chengdu J-9 and Nanchang J-12, met the J-6 replacement project; the lack of viable, high-performance engine. Initially planning to use the WS-9 turbofan engine (a copy of the British Rolls-Royce Spey Mk. 202 engine), setbacks in its development led to initial testing with the WS-6 turbofan engine (which was capable of providing 12,200 kg of thrust). The WS-9 (9,300 kg of thrust) was finally completed by 1980 but would prove to be unable to properly power a single-engine fighter and would later go on to power the twin-engine Xian JH-7 fighter-bomber. In August 1978, an Egyptian Mikoyan-Gurevich MiG-23MS 'Flogger-E' was sent to the 601 Institute and by March 1979 an order to reverse engineer the MiG-23's Tumansky R-29 turbojet engine was placed for use by the project, which by the late 1970s had finalised its design and officially been allocated the designation J-13. The Chinese R-29 copy, called the 'WP-15' (capable of 12,500 kg of wet thrust), like the earlier WS-6 engine, proved to be underwhelming. Delays caused by engine problems, and the success of Shenyang's redesigned Shenyang J-8II caused funding to be severely cut by 1981. The project was technically not cancelled outright though but placed on low-priority. A new list of operational requirements for the J-13 were set in the late 1980s. These requirements were, for the J-13 be able to combat other, newly introduced fighters such as the Mikoyan MiG-29 and F-16 Fighting Falcon. The project was eventually abandoned in the early 1990s due to the success of Chengdu Aircraft Industry Group's Chengdu J-10 project. From the various aerodynamic tests on the seven different airframes, one airframe in particular the J-13V was later incorporated into the further development of Chengdu's J-10 project.

== Design ==
The J-13 was to be a single-engine, single-seat, light-weight, indigenously developed, air-superiority fighter. The J-13's finalised design was a cantilever winged fighter with fuselage side-mounted air intakes. The airframe was designed for high speed and high-altitude interception with limited secondary air-to-ground capabilities, the J-13 possessed a service ceiling of over 19,000 metres, a maximum speed of Mach 2.45 and a climb rate of 254 m/s (50,000 ft/min). The maximum range has been stated to be 2340 km and a maximum overload of +9Gs. Although never armed, the finalised design briefly outlined provisions for a cannon and at least two wingtip-mounted, PL-5 missiles.

== Specifications ==
Data from

General characteristics

- Crew: 1
- Capacity: 4,572 kg (10,080 lb) payload
- Length: 17.5 m (57 ft 5 in)
- Wingspan: 10.4 m (34 ft 1 in)
- Gross weight: 11,600 kg (25,574 lb)
- Powerplant: 1 × Woshan WS-6 or WP-15 afterburning turbofan, 37 kN (8,300 lbf) thrust dry, 56 kN (12,500 lbf) with afterburner

Performance

- Maximum speed: Mach 2.45
- Combat range: 2,340 km (1,450 mi, 1,260 nmi)
- Service ceiling: 19,000 m (62,000 ft)
- Rate of climb: 260 m/s (51,000 ft/min)
- Thrust/weight: 1.07

== See also ==
- People's Liberation Army Air Force
- List of Chinese aircraft engines
