= Shenyang Aircraft Corporation =

Chinese aerospace manufacturer

Coordinates: 41.866421°N 123.434359°E

- Company type: Subsidiary
- Traded as: CSI A100
- Industry: Civilian aircraft manufacturing, defense
- Founded: 1951; 75 years ago
- Headquarters: Shenyang, Liaoning, China
- Key people: Xie Genhua (Chairman)
- Products: Military aircraft
- Number of employees: 15,000
- Parent: Aviation Industry Corporation of China
- Website: sac.com.cn

Shenyang Aircraft Corporation
- Simplified Chinese: 沈阳飞机工业（集团）有限公司
- Traditional Chinese: 瀋陽飛機工業（集團）有限公司
- Literal meaning: Shenyang Aircraft Industry (Group) Company Limited
Transcriptions
Standard Mandarin
- Hanyu Pinyin: Shěnyáng Fēijī Gōngyè (Jítuán) Yǒuxiàn Gōngsī

Shenyang Aircraft Corporation (SAC) is a Chinese aircraft manufacturer in Shenyang, Liaoning and a subsidiary of AVIC. Founded in 1951 as the classified 112 Factory, it is the oldest aircraft manufacturer in the People's Republic of China. The company mainly focuses on designing and manufacturing civilian and military aircraft and related components including jet engines, as well as UAVs such as SYAC UAV.

Aircraft produced by SAC include J-5, JJ-1, J-8, J-11, J-15, J-16, and J-35.

== Facilities ==
- Shenyang Airframe Plant
- Shenyang Aircraft Design Institute

== Products ==
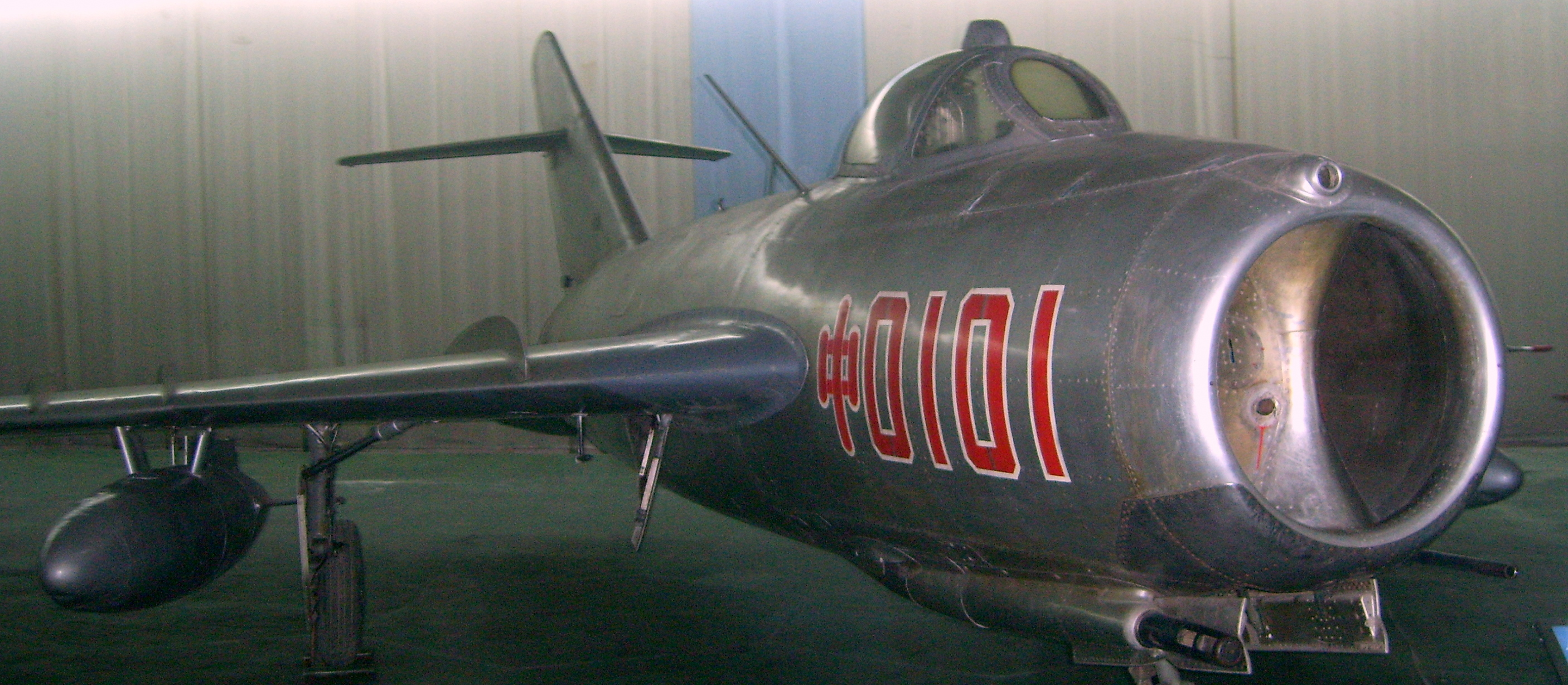
The Shenyang J-5 at Chinese Aviation Museum in Beijing.

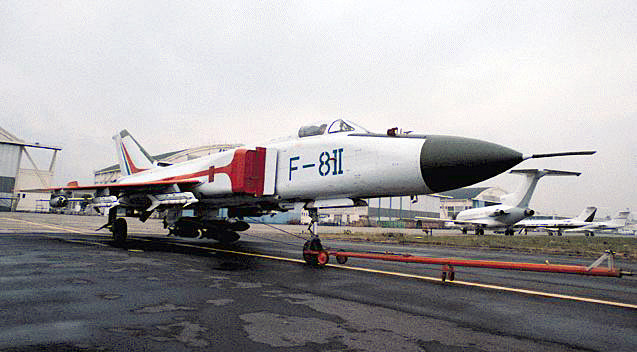
The Shenyang J-8

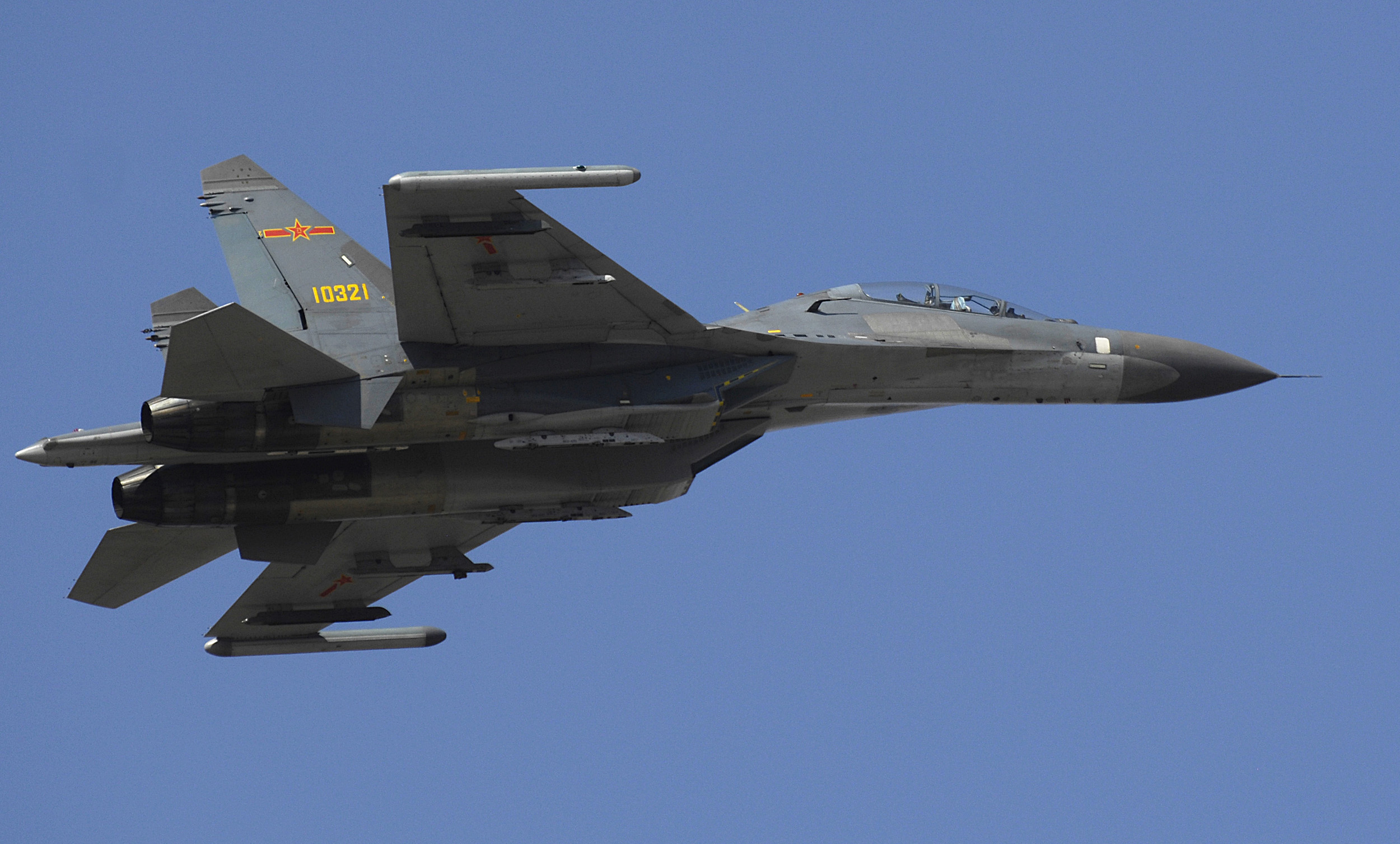
The Shenyang J-11

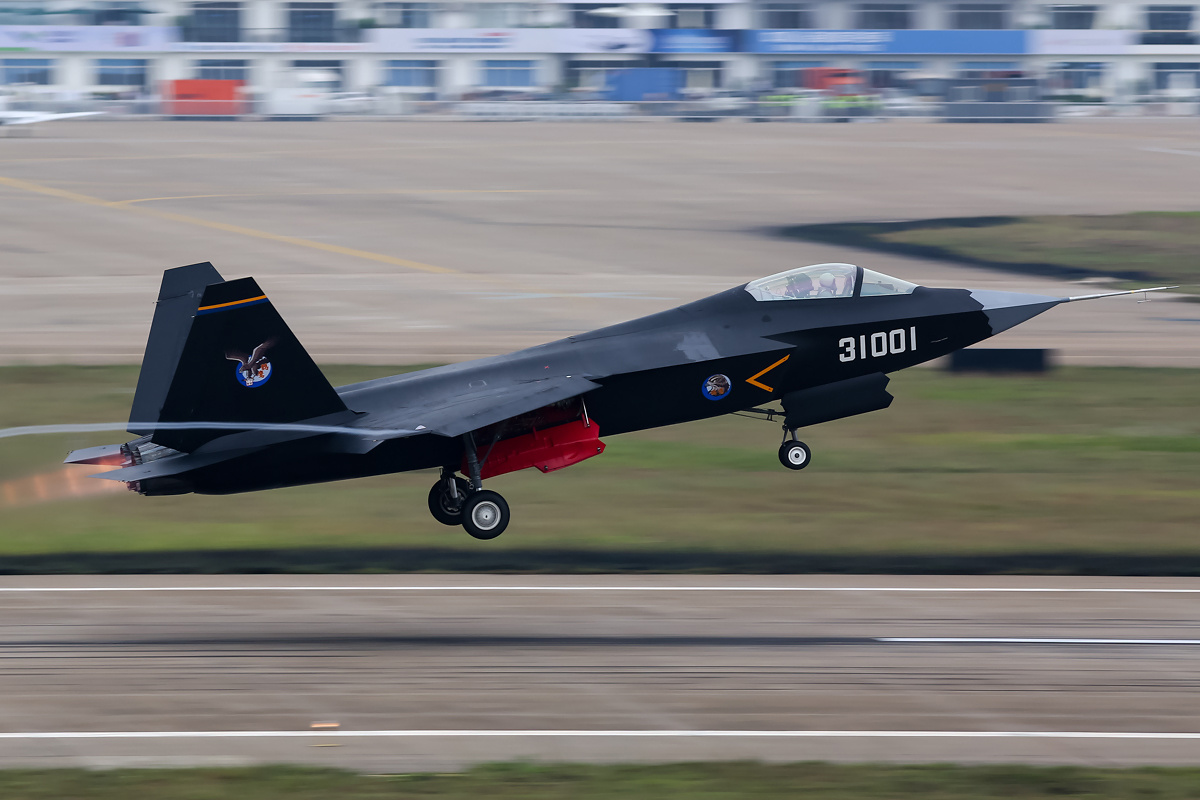
The Shenyang J-31 at the 2014 Zhuhai Air Show.

=== Fighters ===
- J-2, Chinese variant of the Mikoyan-Gurevich MiG-15.
- Shenyang J-5, Chinese variant of the Mikoyan-Gurevich MiG-17.
- Shenyang J-6, Chinese variant of the Mikoyan-Gurevich MiG-19.
- Chengdu J-7, Chinese variant of the Mikoyan-Gurevich MiG-21. Production was moved to Chengdu in the 1970s.
- Shenyang J-8, Indigenously developed 3rd generation fighter aircraft. NATO reporting name Finback.
- Shenyang J-11, Chinese variant of the Russian Sukhoi Su-27.
- Shenyang J-13, Cancelled air superiority fighter project.
- Shenyang J-15, Carrier-borne naval multirole fighter
- Shenyang J-16, Strike fighter aircraft
- Shenyang J-35, A mid weight fifth-generation fighter aircraft

==== In development ====
- Shenyang J-50, A cranked arrow configuration with sharply swept wing aircraft, possibly a Sixth-generation fighter (in development).

=== Civilian jetliners ===
- ACAC ARJ21 Xiangfeng, collaborating with other companies of AVIC I.

=== Bombers ===
- Xian H-6 bomber: Chinese variant of the Soviet Tupolev Tu-16 Badger. Collaboration with Xi'an Aircraft Industrial Corporation.
- Nanchang Q-5 fighter bomber. Designed in Shenyang and later moved to Nanchang Aircraft for production.

=== General aviation aircraft ===
- Shenyang type 5: Chinese production version of the Russian Yakovlev Yak-12 utility aircraft.
- Cessna 162

=== Engines ===
- Turbofan WS-10, Taihang
- Turbojet WP-14, Kunlun
- Turbofan WS-20

=== Parts ===
- Associated Lyulka AL-31 turbofan engine
- Whole tail sections and cargo doors for Boeing
- Parts for Bombardier Aerospace (CSeries fuselage, Dash 8 fuselage and wings) and McDonnell Douglas

=== UAVs and Drones ===
- Shenyang BA-5

=== Canceled ===
- Shenyang J-13: a cancelled 1971 Chinese light fighter aircraft

== Partnership with Cessna ==
On 27 November 2007, Cessna announced that the Cessna 162 Light Sport Aircraft would be produced by the Shenyang Aircraft Corporation. The first production Cessna 162 took flight at Shenyang on 17 September 2009. The aircraft was not a success and production ended in January 2014 after 192 were sold.

== See also ==
- ACAC consortium
- Aviation Industry Corporation of China
- Changhe Aircraft Industries Corporation
- Chengdu Aircraft Industry Group
- Guizhou Aircraft Industry Co.
- Harbin Aircraft Industry Group
- Hongdu Aviation Industry Corporation
- Shaanxi Aircraft Company
- Shanghai Aviation Industrial Company
- Xi'an Aircraft Industrial Corporation
