= Xi'an Y-20 =

Chinese military transport aircraft

Y-20 Kunpeng
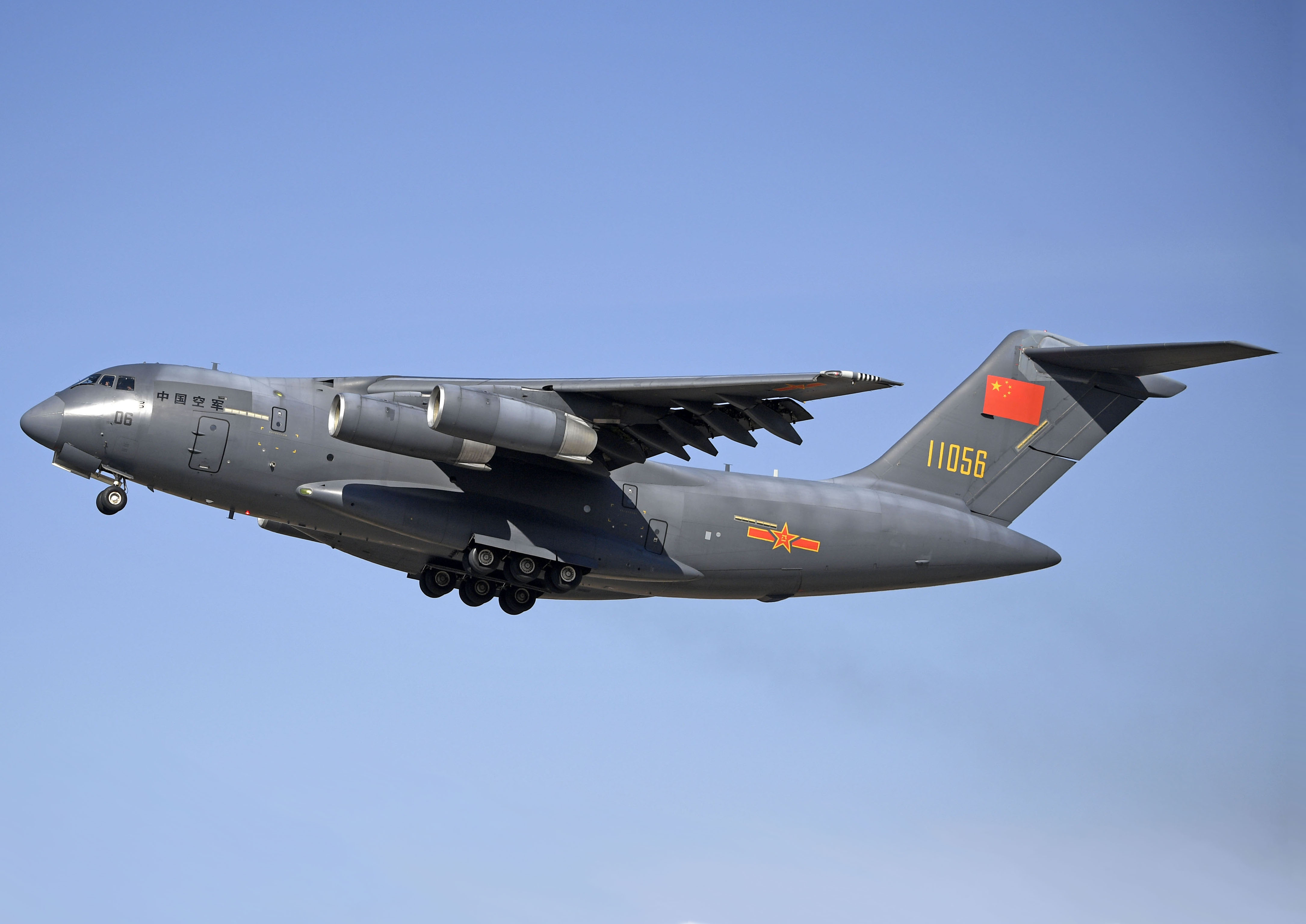
- Y-20 at Airshow China 2016

General information
- Type: Strategic airlifter
- National origin: China
- Manufacturer: Xi'an Aircraft Industrial Corporation
- Designer: Tang Changhong
- Status: In service, in production
- Primary user: People's Liberation Army Air Force
- Number built: 100 as of 2026

History
- Manufactured: 2013–present
- Introduction date: 6 July 2016
- First flight: 26 January 2013

The Xi'an Y-20 Kunpeng (Chinese: 运-20 鲲鹏; pinyin: Yùn-20 Kūnpéng; lit. 'Transport-20 Kunpeng') is a large four-engine military transport aircraft that was developed by the Xi'an Aircraft Industrial Corporation for the People's Liberation Army Air Force of China.

While the official series name of the aircraft is Kunpeng, a mythical giant fish-bird from the Taoist classic Zhuangzi, it is nicknamed "Chubby Girl" (Chinese: 胖妞; pinyin: Pàng niū) in the Chinese aviation industry because its fuselage is much wider than aircraft previously developed in China.

== Development ==
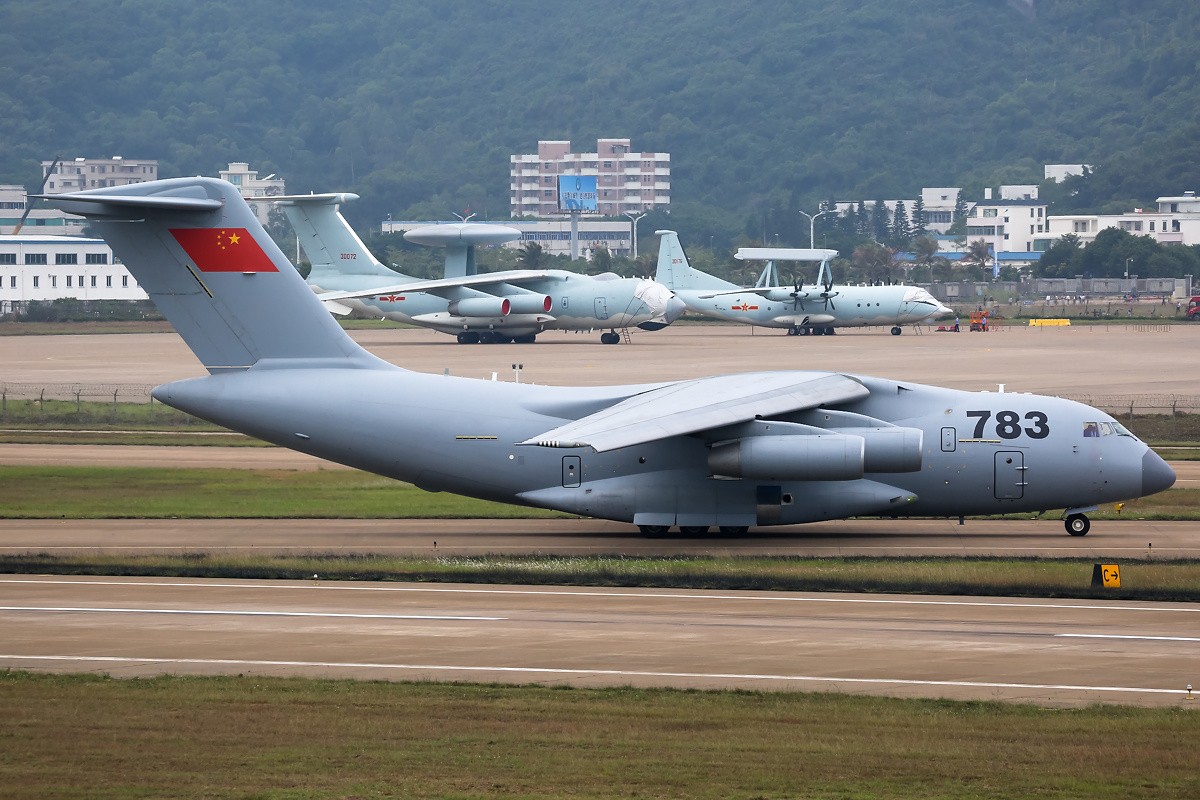
Y-20 prototype at Airshow China 2014

The Y-20 project began in July 2007. Images of the Y-20 prototype emerged at the end of 2012. The first flight occurred on 26 January 2013.

According to Chinese media, the Y-20 is the first cargo aircraft to use 3D printing technology. To speed up the development, reduce the workload, and lower its manufacturing cost. Model-based definition (MBD) design technique was also implemented, and it was the third aircraft to utilize MBD technology in the world, after Airbus A380 (2000) and Boeing 787 (2005). A project team to implement MBD for the Y-20 program was formally formed in October 2009, and after the initial success in application on the main landing gear, MBD application was expanded to the entire aircraft and became mandatory for all contractors and subcontractors of the Y-20 program.

The implementation of MBD was initially met with strong resistance, with only a third of suppliers agreeing to implement MBD. However, the general designer of Y-20 declared that those who refused to implement MBD would be banned from participating in the Y-20 program, thus forcing everyone to comply, resulting in increases in productivity.

The implementation of MBD greatly shortened the time required. For example, without MBD, installation of wings takes a month or two, but with MBD adopted, the time is drastically shortened to just a few hours, and in general, the design work was reduced by 40%, preparation for production was reduced by 75%, and manufacturing cycle reduced by 30%. The structural test was completed in 194 days as opposed to the 300 days originally planned, thanks to the successful development and application of an automated structural strength analysis system. In comparison, similar work for the Xi'an JH-7 took a year.

In addition to 3D printing, the Y-20 is also the first aircraft in China to adopt a Relational-Data-Base-Management (RDBM) system for its development. Headed by the deputy general designer of structural design, Mr. Feng Jun (冯军), the initial attempt to implement RDBM actually failed after two months spent on the application on the nose section. It was only after the second attempt, which took another three months on the application on wings did RDBM became successful. The adaptation of RDBM greatly shortened the development time by at least eight months, and the modification of wing design that previously took a week is shortened to half a day. The development of human-machine interface for the Y-20 utilized virtual reality via helmet-mounted display

The airlifter was developed into the YY-20 tanker variant to expand the PLAAF's aerial refueling capability beyond its existing limited and obsolescent Xi'an H-6U fleet. Evidence of the tanker variant emerged in 2018 with satellite images; its first flight occurred that year. Aerial refueling was being performed by the airforce by 2021 and refueling planes formally entered PLAAF service in 2022.

In 2020, the Y-20 was observed undergoing in-flight testing with four Shenyang WS-20 high-bypass engines. According to news reports, the variant of the Y-20 powered by new WS-20 engines had entered operational service with the People's Liberation Army Air Force by April 2023 at the latest. In November 2023, the Y-20B MRTT was observed in an operational tanker configuration.

== Design ==
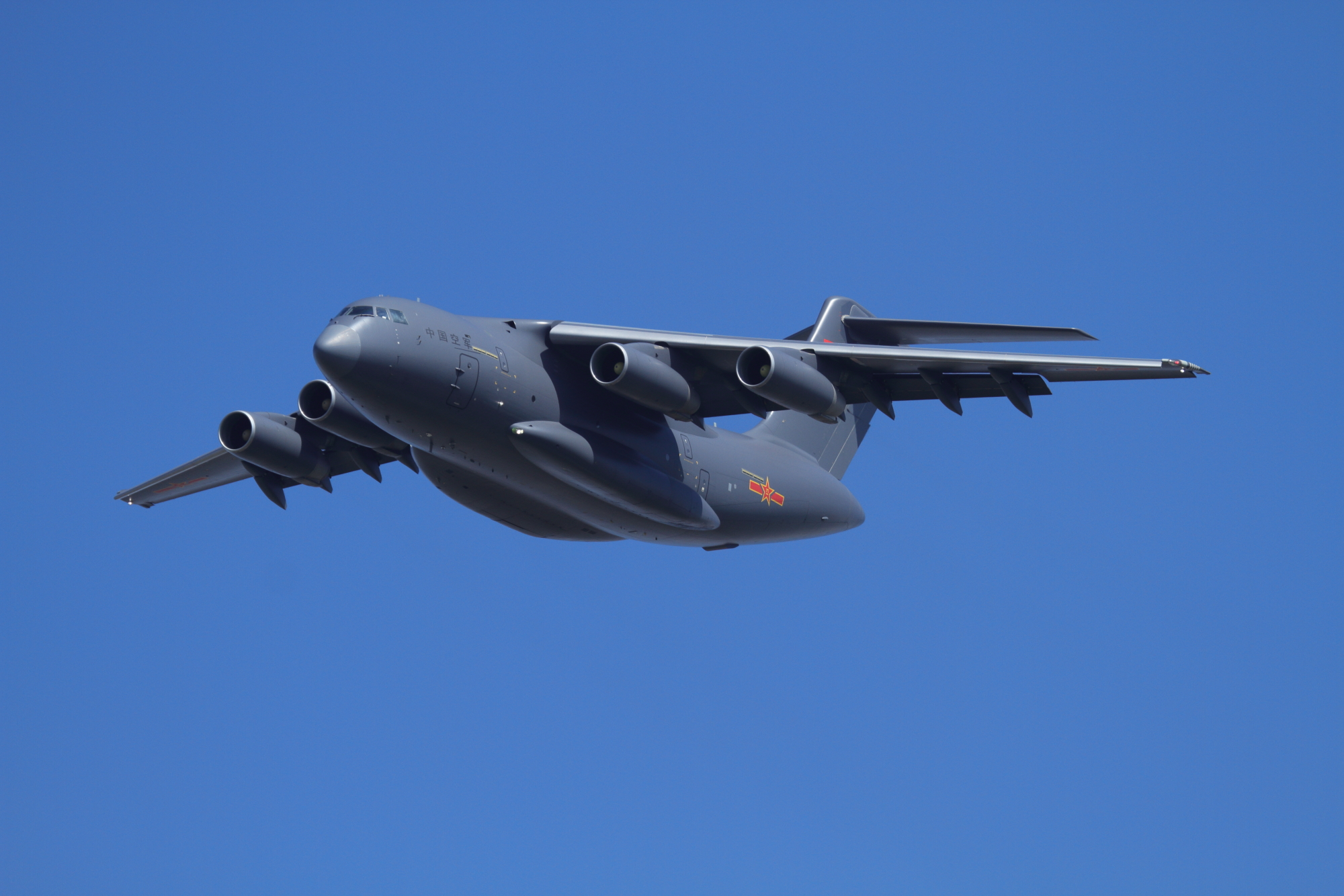
Y-20 production model at Airshow China 2016

=== Characteristics ===
The Y-20 uses components made of composite materials. Eight types of different relays used on Y-20 are developed by Guilin Aerospace Co., Ltd. a wholly own subsidiary of China Tri-River Aerospace Group Co., Ltd.(中国三江航天集团), which is also known as the 9th Academy of the China Aerospace Science and Industry Corporation (CASIC). The composites were produced in China, whereas in the past they had to be imported. The Y-20's cabin incorporates flame-retardant composites developed by the 703 Institute of the China Aerospace Science and Technology Corporation (CASC). The 703 Institute was created in March 2009, with development taking three years. The performance of the composites is reportedly comparable to those that fulfil FAR Part 25.835. The 703 Institute achieved another milestone by establishing a comprehensive Chinese evaluation and certification system for aircraft composite materials based on international standards.

Cargo is loaded through a large aft ramp that accommodates rolling stock. The Y-20 incorporates a shoulder wing, T-tail, rear cargo-loading assembly, and heavy-duty retractable landing gear, consisting of three rows, with a pair of wheels for each row, totaling six wheels for each side. According to the deputy general designer, the shortest take-off distance of the Y-20 is 600 to 700 metres (2,000 to 2,300 ft). Y-20 incorporates a total of four large LCD EFIS displays.

=== Propulsion ===
The Y-20 prototypes were powered by four 12-ton thrust Soloviev D-30KP-2 engines, and the aircraft entered production in 2016 with those engines. However, there had always been plans to develop Chinese alternatives.

Testing with the Chengdu WS-18 engine (reverse-engineered copy of D-30KP-2) may have occurred by late 2017. Compared to the D-30, the WS-18 was 300 kg (660 lb) lighter, weighing in at 2,000 kg (4,400 lb); with thrust increased from 12.5 per ton of the D-30 to 13.2 per ton; fuel consumption of the WS-18 was also reduced in comparison to the D-30, and the mean time between overhaul of the WS-18 was 3000 hours. However, because the increase in thrust was not significant in comparison to the D-30, the WS-18 was only likely to be a stopgap measure before the more modern Shenyang WS-20 was ready.

The Chinese had also always intended to replace the Soloviev D-30KP-2 with the 14-ton thrust Shenyang WS-20, which was required for the Y-20 to achieve its maximum cargo capacity of 66 tons. The WS-20 was derived from the core of the Shenyang WS-10, an indigenous Chinese turbofan engine for fighter aircraft. Single-engine testing with the WS-20 may have occurred by February 2019. The WS-20 is more fuel efficient than D-30KP, has higher thrust, giving Y-20 better range, endurance, and a higher operational altitude.

Four-engine in-flight testing may have occurred by December 2020. The engine continued in development in late-2021. In March 2023, Y-20 planes equipped with Shenyang WS-20 engines (designated Y-20B) were likely incorporated into the PLAAF service. In the same month, the executive of Aero Engine Corporation of China (AECC) announced the that China "[had] overcome all technical bottlenecks" regarding engines such as the WS-20. The switch reduced China's reliance on Russian engines.

=== Transport capacity ===
The Y-20's four-meter-tall hold can lift up to 66 t (146,000 lb), and transport up to 2 Type 15 tanks or 1 Type 99A tank over a distance of 7,800 km (4,800 mi).

The aircraft provides various internal configurations, one of which allows for a separate passenger deck above the cargo. Rails are mounted on the ceiling to facilitate offloading in areas where the rear ramp is inaccessible.

The Y-20B allows for multi-role tanker/transport (MRTT) capability, with the modular cargo bay capable of holding traditional cargo or auxiliary fuel tanks. Two hose-and-drogue refuelling pods can be fitted on the underwing hardpoints, allowing the Y-20B to work as tanker aircraft.

== Operational history ==
=== Production ===
As of 2013, a single Xi'an Y-20 aircraft cost $160 million.

In 2014, a report from the People's Liberation Army's National Defence University stated that the PRC's civil and military transport needed 400 Y-20s. In 2016, Zhu Qian of the Aviation Industry Corporation of China stated that more than a thousand were needed.

After incorporating the Y-20 into the PLAAF service, analysts noted Y-20 had an extremely quick production rate, with a large number of production aircraft spotted within the PLAAF testing base. By 2023, PLAAF was equipped with 67 Y-20 aircraft.

According to a 2023 assessment by Aviation Week, the Y-20 was scheduled to replace Russian airframes, including the Ilyushin Il-76 and H-6U tanker variants. Analyst Matt Jouppi suggested airborne early warning and control was likely under development and that by 2032, China would likely have 75 YY-20 tankers and more than 100 Y-20 transport planes.

In October 2025, the Y-20B AEW (KJ-3000) aircraft reportedly entered serial production.

=== Deployment ===
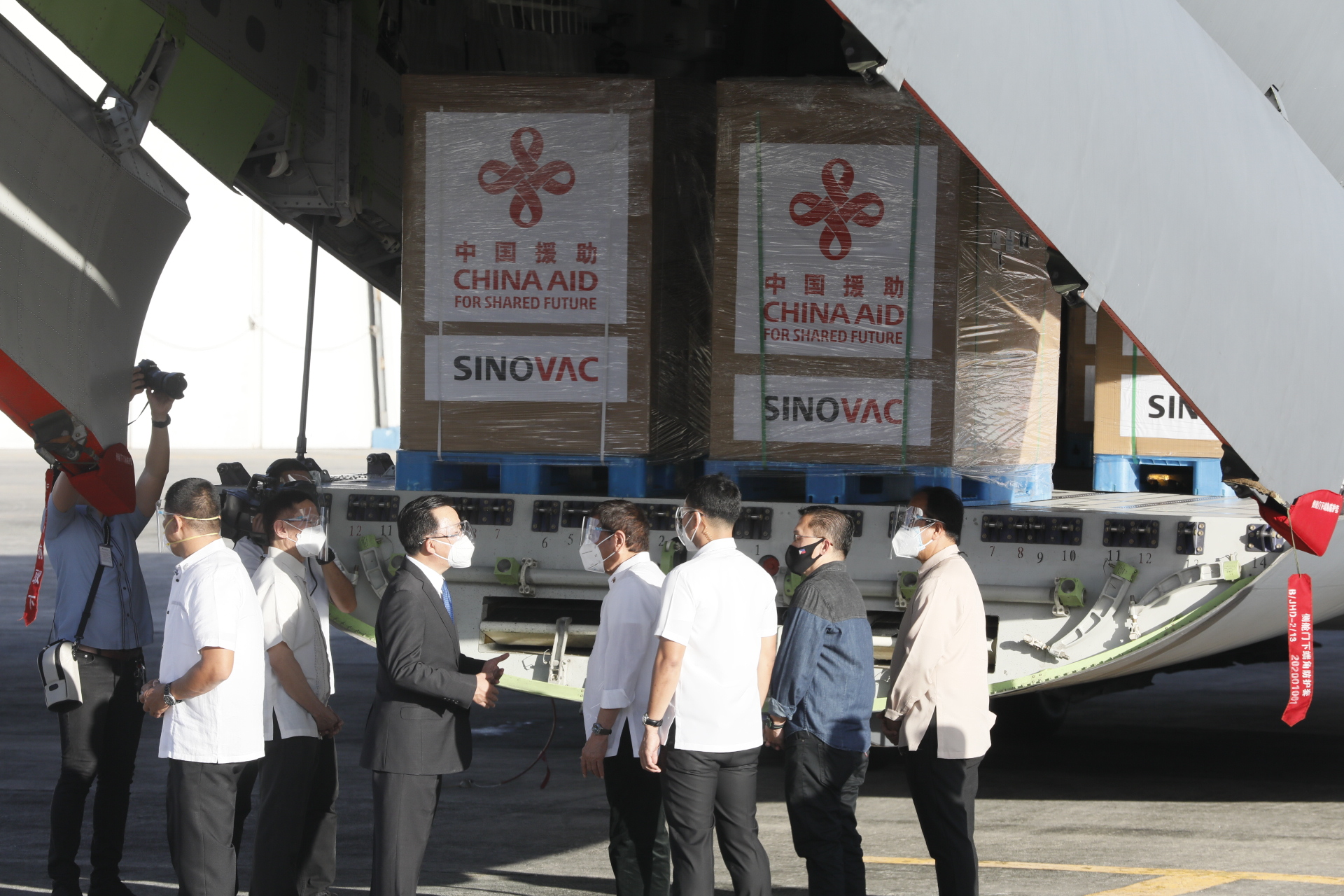
Chinese Ambassador and former Philippine President Rodrigo Duterte in front of Y-20 cargo doors

On 6 July 2016, the first serial Y-20 (serial number 11051) was handed over to the PLAAF in a ceremony. The second aircraft numbered 11052 followed soon after - it was assigned to the 12th Regiment of the 4th Transport Division at Qionglai, Chengdu.

On 8 May 2018, it was announced by PLAAF's military media that Y-20 had recently conducted its first joint airdrop training operations with the PLAAF airborne troops.

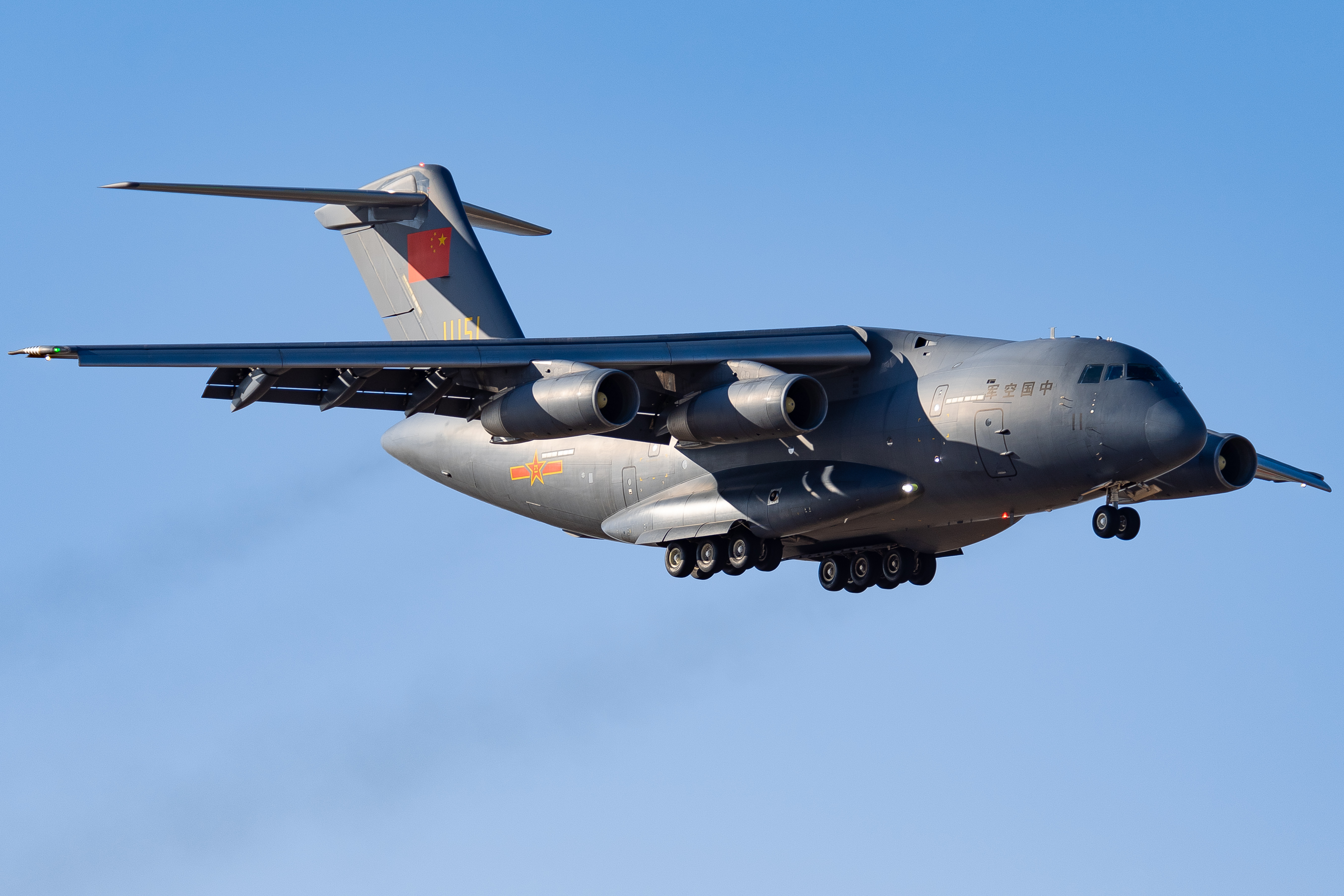
A Y-20 landing at Beijing Capital International Airport to transport the Sinopharm BIBP vaccine to Cambodia in February 2021

On 13 February 2020, the Y-20 was part of a fleet that delivered supplies and personnel to Wuhan. The operation was part of an effort to mitigate what became the COVID-19 pandemic. A fleet of 11 aircraft delivered 2,600 military medical staff to Wuhan. The PLAAF fleet of 11 aircraft consists of 6 Y-20s, 3 Il-76s, and 2 Y-9 transport aircraft. This is Y-20's first civilian mission, signaling the increasing military involvement in pandemic response.

On 5 June 2021, the PLAAF transport aircraft fleet, including Y-20, was observed patrolling the South China Sea, which was accused of intrusion by Malaysia. Japanese Air Self-Defense Force analyst Aita Moriki believed the Chinese action was to display the airborne corps' power projection capabilities.

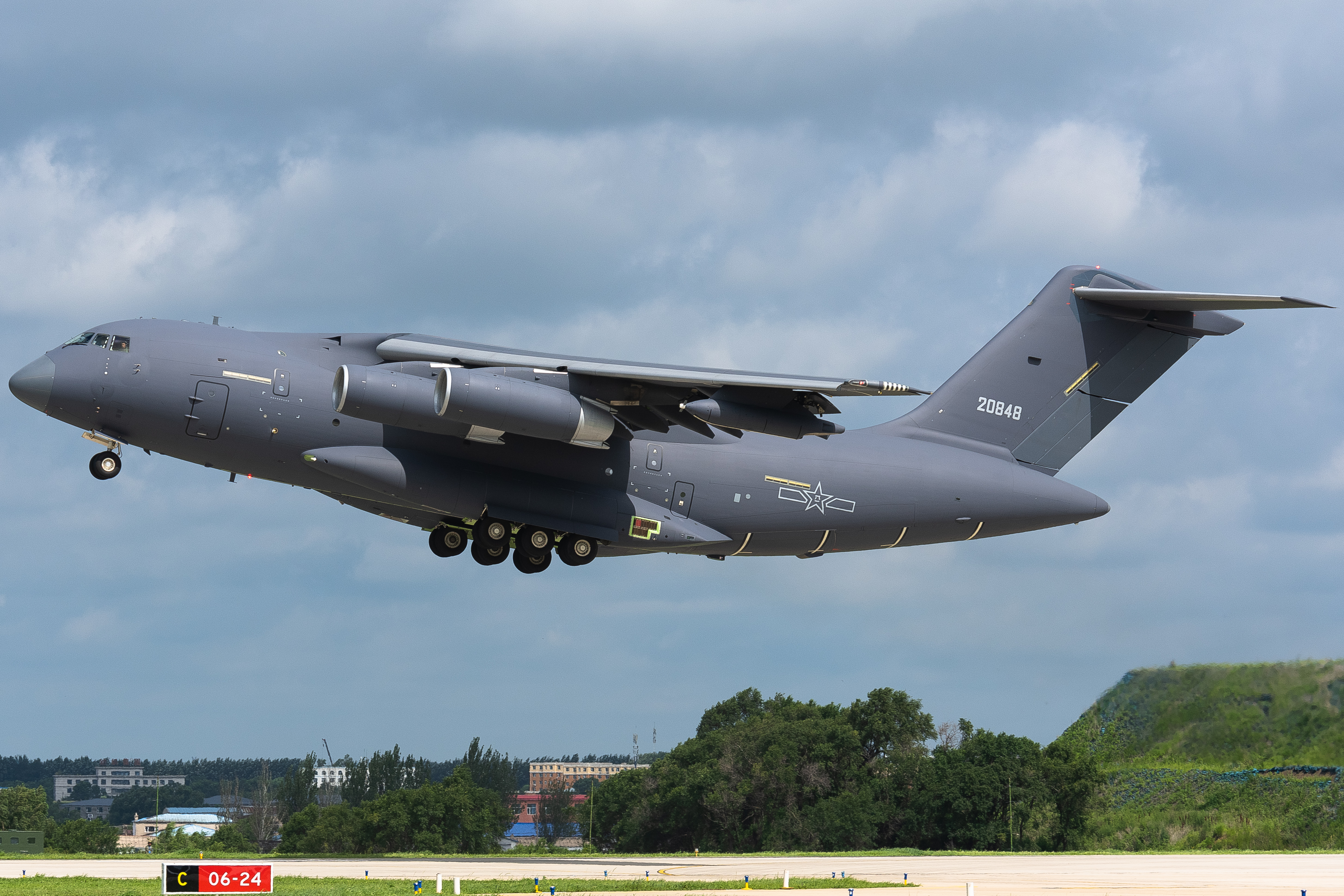
YY-20 taking off

On 28 November 2021, a Y-20U (YY-20) aerial tanker was spotted on the southwest side of Taiwan island among 27 military aircraft. This is the first observation of Y-20U outside of inland China.

On 27 January 2022, two Y-20 aircraft arrived in Tonga after traveling over 10,000 kilometers from Guangzhou Baiyun, delivering 33 tons of supplies including food, fresh water, water purifiers, and tents due to the 2022 Hunga Tonga–Hunga Ha'apai eruption and tsunami.

On 9 April 2022, six Y-20 aircraft landed at Belgrade Nikola Tesla Airport in Serbia, reportedly delivering a shipment of FK-3 surface-to-air missile systems.

On 28 June 2022, six Y-20 arrived in Afghanistan to deliver 105 tonnes of humanitarian aid in response to June 2022 Afghanistan earthquake.

On 1 August 2022, Senior Colonel and PLAAF spokesperson Shen Jinke told a press conference that Y-20 tanker aircraft started combat readiness training. The aircraft is confirmed in PLAAF service with the confirmed designation YY-20. The designation was later confirmed as YY-20 at Zhuhai Airshow 2022. The YY-20 features redesigned landing gear sponsons with sharper front and back ends, which reduce air turbulence. In September 2022, Chinese released footage of Y-20 tankers providing aerial refueling to Chengdu J-20 fighters.

In early September 2022, Y-20 was present at the Airpower 22 airshow in Austria. This was the first time that the Y-20 was present at an airshow in Western Europe.

In November and December 2024, five re-engined Y-20Bs were spotted inside PLAAF facilities, suggesting they entered service. On 3 September 2025, Chinese state media China Daily announced that Y-20B has been part of the PLAAF arsenal.

In April 2026, Y-20B conducted its first overseas deployment, a repatriation mission to South Korea.

In June 2026, ten Y-20Bs were observed at the Kaifeng Air Base, indicating expansion of deployment within PLAAF.

== Variants ==
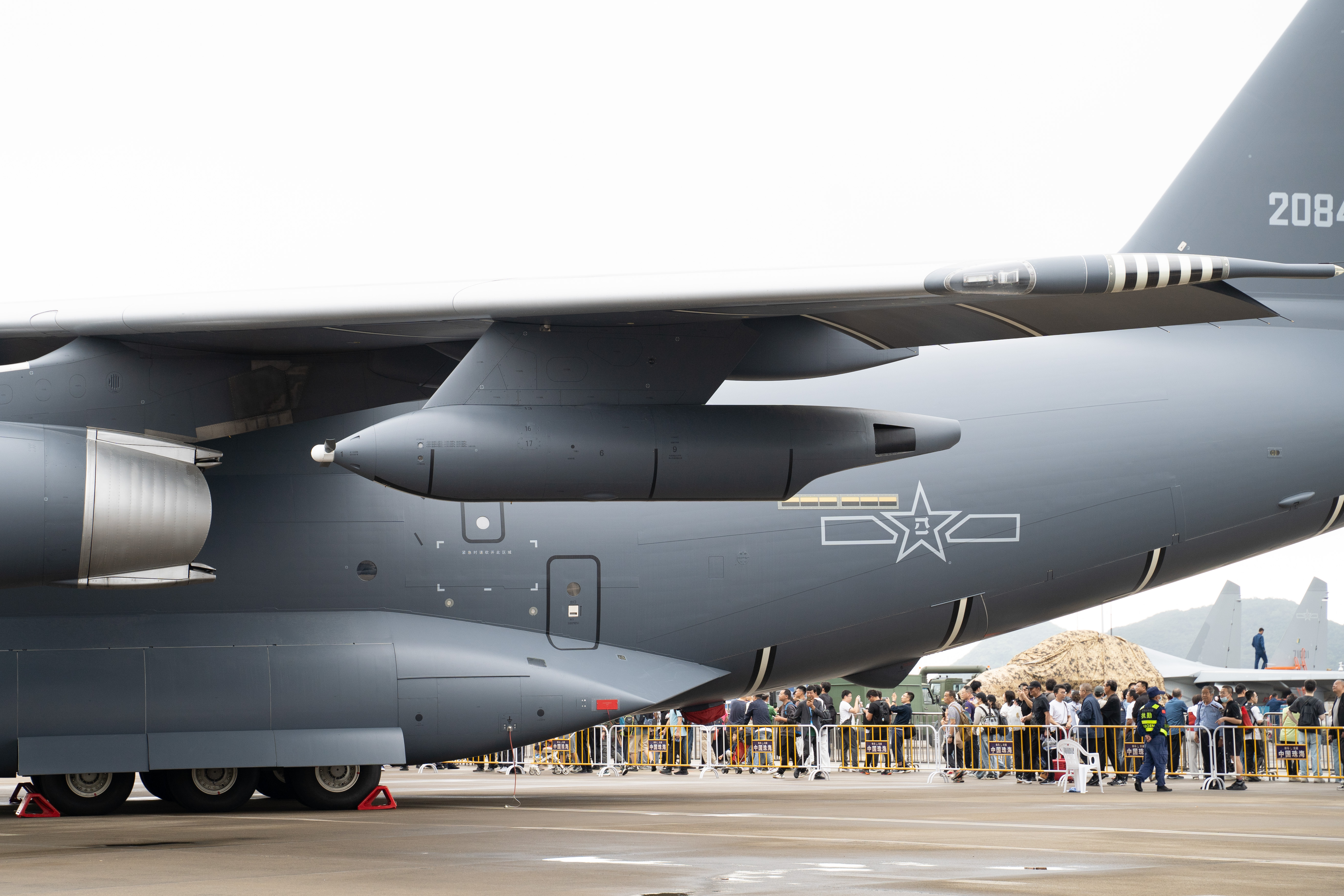
YY-20's air refueling pod

Y-20
Prototypes and the initial batches, with Soloviev D-30KP-2 and Chengdu WS-18 engines.
Y-20A
Base variant, with Chengdu WS-18 engines.
YY-20A
Aerial tanker variant based on Y-20A. It's capable of carrying about 90 tons of fuel, similar to the role of Il-78. The tanker variant features redesigned landing gear sponsons. Previously known as Y-20U or YU-20, but was confirmed as YY-20.
Y-20B
Multi-role tanker/transport (MRTT) variant with four Shenyang WS-20 engines. It features a modular cargo bay and underwing hardpoints for both cargo transport and tanker missions.
Y-20B AEW (KJ-3000)
Airborne early warning and control variant based on Y-20B, designated as KJ-3000 by military observers. AEW&C variant was spotted flight testing on 27 December 2024. The KJ-3000 features the new Shenyang WS-20 turbofan engines, a in-flight refueling probe, new radome, communication intelligence (COMINT) antennas, electronic intelligence (ELINT) antennas, and satellite communication systems.

== Controversy ==
On July 13, 2016, Chinese national Su Bin pled guilty to charges that he conspired with others to hack into American defense contractor Boeing and steal documents related to the development of the C-17, F-22 and F-35 aircraft. He admitted to analyzing and translating stolen documents from English to Chinese, which he then emailed to the Second Department of the People's Liberation Army General Staff Department. Su Bin admitted he did so for financial gain. According to Court documents, Su Bin's emails describe how the stolen info "...has extremely vital significance in our country's speeding up the development" of Project A (the Xi'an Y-20). Su Bin was sentenced to 3 years and 10 months in U.S. Federal prison and a $10,000 fine. With time served, he was released in October 2017.

== Operators ==
- China
  - People's Liberation Army Air Force - 55 Y-20 transport, 30 YY-20A transport / tanker and 10 Y-20B transport / tanker in service as of 2026
    - One regiment in the 4th Transport Division
    - Three regiments in the 13th Transport Division

== Specifications (Y-20B) ==
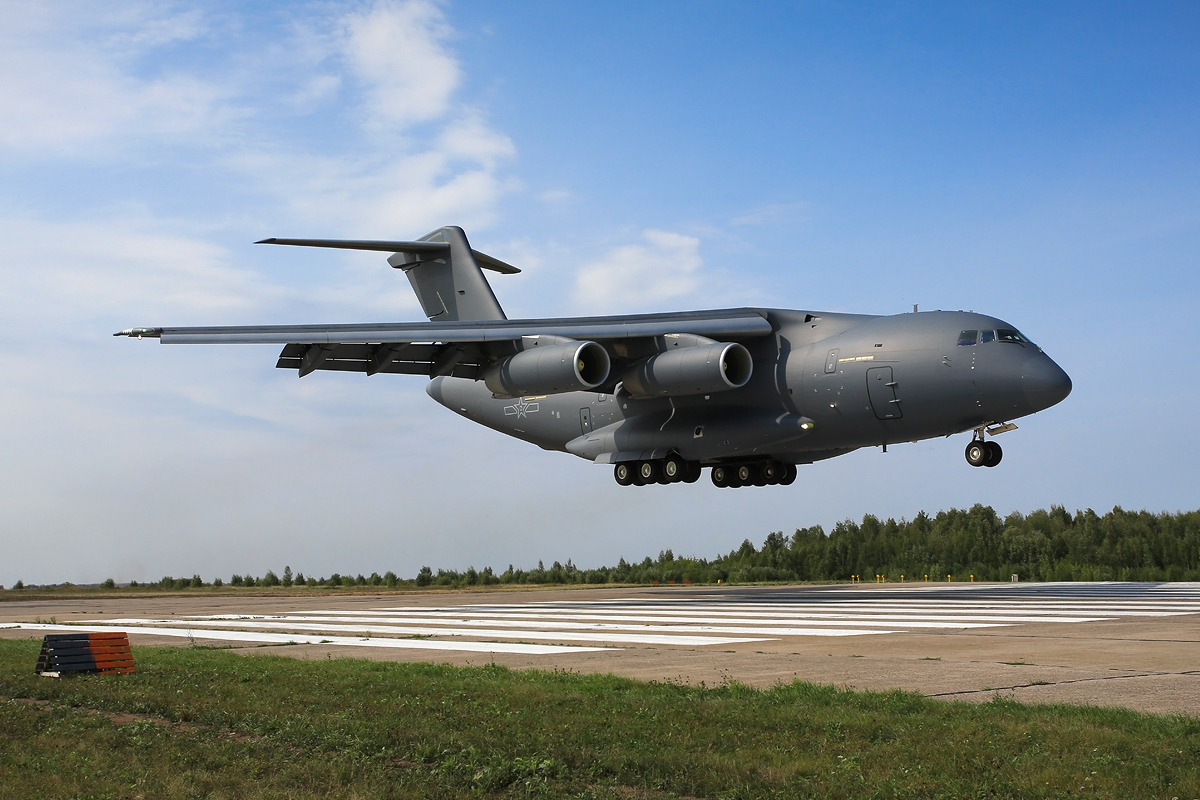
Y-20A in PLAAF low-visibility markings

Data from Military Today

General characteristics

- Crew: 3
- Capacity: 66,000 kg (145,505 lb)
- Length: 47 m (154 ft 2 in)
- Wingspan: 50 m (164 ft 1 in)
- Height: 15 m (49 ft 3 in)
- Empty weight: 100,000 kg (220,462 lb)
- Max takeoff weight: 220,000 kg (485,017 lb)
- Powerplant: 4 × Shenyang WS-20 turbofan engines, 140 kN (31,000 lbf) thrust each

Performance

- Maximum speed: 926 km/h (575 mph, 500 kn)
- Maximum speed: Mach 0.75
- Cruise speed: 630 km/h (390 mph, 340 kn)
- Range: 7,800 km (4,800 mi, 4,200 nmi) with 2 Type 15 tanks
- Ferry range: 10,000 km (6,200 mi, 5,400 nmi) with 16.5 tons of freight
- Service ceiling: 13,000 m (43,000 ft)
- Wing loading: 710 kg/m^{2} (150 lb/sq ft)

== See also ==
- Ilyushin Il-76
- Ilyushin Il-78
- Airbus A400M Atlas
- Boeing C-17 Globemaster III
