= Shenyang Aeroengine Research Institute =

Chinese aeroengine design institute

Shenyang Aeroengine Research Institute (Chinese: 沈阳发动机设计研究所; pinyin: Shěnyáng Fādòngjī Shèjì Yánjiū Suǒ) or the 606 Institute is a Chinese aeroengine design institute of the Aero Engine Corporation of China. In the past, it has partnered with Shenyang Aircraft Corporation in developing military aircraft engines.

== Products ==
- Turbofan WS-10, Taihang
- Turbojet WP-14, Kunlun
