= Shenyang WS-20 =

Chinese high-bypass turbofan engine

WS-20
- Type: High-bypass turbofan
- National origin: People's Republic of China
- Manufacturer: Shenyang Liming Aircraft Engine Company
- Designer: Shenyang Aeroengine Research Institute
- Major applications: Xi'an Y-20
- Status: Initial production
- Developed from: Shenyang WS-10

The Shenyang WS-20 (Chinese: 涡扇-20; pinyin: Wōshàn-20; lit. 'turbofan-20') is a high-bypass turbofan aircraft engine designed by the Shenyang Aeroengine Research Institute for the PLAAF's Y-20 family of strategic airlifters, it is currently installed in limited numbers. It is based on the core of the low-bypass turbofan Shenyang WS-10A. The thrust range is 138 kilonewtons (31,000 lb_{f}).

Testing with the Ilyushin Il-76 began by 2013. Development continued in 2021. Images of Y-20 equipped with WS-20s emerged in 2022.

Four-engine in-flight testing may have occurred by December 2020. The engine continued in development in late-2021. In March 2023, Y-20 planes equipped with Shenyang WS-20 engines (designated Y-20B) were likely incorporated into the PLAAF service, as intelligence showed Y-20B aircraft with the PLAAF roundels and colours at Kaifeng Air Base.

In March 2023, an executive of Aero Engine Corporation of China (AECC) announced that China "[had] overcome all technical bottlenecks" regarding engines such as the WS-20. The switch reduced China's reliance on Russian engines. In 2024, the fleet of Y-20B aircraft that use the WS-20 engines was further expanding.

== Applications ==
- Xi'an Y-20

== See also ==
- ACAE CJ-1000A
- Shenyang WS-15
