= Shenyang WS-10 =

Chinese fighter turbofan engine

WS-10
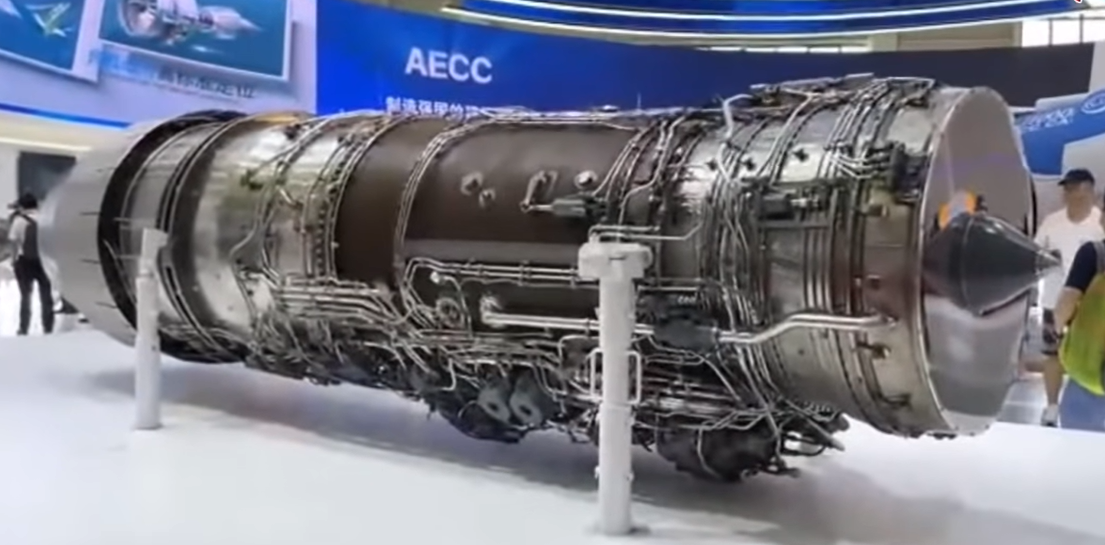
- Type: Turbofan
- National origin: People's Republic of China
- Manufacturer: Shenyang Liming Aircraft Engine Company
- Designer: Shenyang Aeroengine Research Institute
- First run: 1990s
- Major applications: Chengdu J-10C; Shenyang J-11B; Shenyang J-15; Shenyang J-16; Chengdu J-20
- Status: In production
- Number built: 300+ as of May 2015
- Developed into: Shenyang WS-20

The Shenyang WS-10 (Chinese: 涡扇-10; pinyin: Wōshàn-10; lit. 'turbofan-10'), codename Taihang, is a turbofan engine designed and built by the People's Republic of China.

Chinese media reported 266 engines were manufactured from 2010 to 2012 for the J-11 program. Unofficial estimates placed production at more than 300 units by May 2015.

== Description ==
The WS-10A is advertised as an engine with 120–140 kilonewtons (27,000–31,000 lb_{f}) thrust. It has full authority digital engine control (FADEC).

== Development ==
The WS-10 is reverse engineered from the CFM56 with the experience gained from the Woshan WS-6 turbofan project, which was abandoned at the start of the 1980s. The WS-10 project was reportedly started by Deng Xiaoping in 1986 to produce an engine comparable to the Saturn AL-31. The work was given to the Shenyang Aeroengine Research Institute (606 Institute) of the Aviation Industry Corporation of China (AVIC). Initial production models suffered quality issues from the early direct use of AL-31 control systems. Furthermore, Salyut reportedly refused to sell the source code for its control system, and this may have resulted in China spending nearly 20 years developing its own code independently. An early version of the FADEC flew on an J-8II in 2002.

The WS-10A, targeted for 130 kilonewtons (29,000 lb_{f}) of thrust, was already in development in 2002. In 2004, Russian sources familiar with project reported problems meeting the thrust target; in 2005, they reported problems reducing the weight of the primary and secondary compressors, in addition to problems meeting thrust requirements. Engine testing on the J-11 had already started by 2004, and testing using one engine on the J-11 may have occurred as early as 2002.

A full-scale WS-10A engine was first seen at the 2008 China International Aviation & Aerospace Exhibition.

In 2009, Western media claim that the WS-10A approached the performance of the AL-31, but took much longer than the AL-31 to develop thrust. Furthermore, the engine reportedly only generated 110–125 kilonewtons (25,000–28,000 lb_{f}) of thrust. In April 2009, Lin Zuoming, head of AVIC, reported that the engine's quality was unsatisfactory. In 2010, it was reported that reliability was also poor; the WS-10A lasted only 30 hours, while the AL-31 needed refurbishing after 400 hours. The quality problems encountered with the WS-10A reflected the state of the Chinese aerospace industry. AVIC initiated a general effort to improve quality control throughout its production chain in 2011.

The WS-10A reportedly matured enough after 2009 to power the twin-engined J-11B Block 02 aircraft. Production or performance issues may have prevented the WS-10A from powering the single-engined J-10B. In 2018, Chinese state media reported an increase in engine lifespan from 800 to 1,500 hours due to the increased heat resistance of new third-generation single-crystal turbine blades.

In March 2020, Chinese state media released a video showing a WS-10B-powered J-10C; aircraft markings suggest it was part of the fourth batch of J-10Cs for the PLAAF.

The WS-10 has also powered various versions of the Chengdu J-20. The WS-10B reportedly powered low rate initial production aircraft in 2015, and was used as an interim engine before the adoption of the AL-31. In 2019, the Xian WS-15 – the J-20's intended engine – failed trials, leading to the decision to replace the AL-31 with the WS-10C as the interim engine; reportedly, the AL-31 was unacceptable because Russia refused to sell additional engines unless China also bought the Sukhoi Su-35 as well. Testing was underway by November 2020. In January 2022, it was reported that J-20's powered by the WS-10C would be upgraded with TVC.

The original WS-10A has a thrust-to-weight ratio of 7.5, the improved WS-10B is rated approximately 9.0, while the WS-10C is capable of 9.5 or higher — adequate for the Chengdu J-20 to supercruise.

In November 2022, a production Shenyang J-15 powered by the WS-10, possibly the WS-10B, appeared in Chinese media. It was the last indigenous Chinese combat aircraft to replace the AL-31; possibly due to navalisation. According to Chinese observers, compared to the AL-31 the WS-10 had superior safety, reliability, and service life, aspects which are magnified by the constraints of carrier aviation. The replacement reflected continuing improvements in China's aviation engine industry.

=== WS-20 (WS-188) ===
The Shenyang WS-20 (WS-188) is a high-bypass engine, reportedly producing 13.8 tons of thrust. It is believed to be based on the core of the WS-10A.

The Shenyang WS-20 is believed to be intended for the Y-20 strategic airlifter.

=== Thrust vectoring ===
A testbed J-10B powered by a WS-10 with thrust vectoring (TVC) – called "WS-10B-3" by Jamie Hunter – was demonstrated at the 2018 China International Aviation & Aerospace Exhibition. The TVC nozzle uses actuator-assisted moving petals, similar in concept to General Electric's axisymmetric vectoring exhaust nozzle (AVEN) and Pratt & Whitney's pitch-yaw balance beam nozzle (PYBBN).

== Variants ==
- WS-10 – base variant
- WS-10A – improved variant with FADEC; advertised to have 120–140 kilonewtons (27,000–31,000 lb_{f}) thrust.
- WS-10B – improved variant with greater reliability and thrust; based on the WS-10A, with thrust reported as 135 kilonewtons (30,000 lb_{f}) by Janes in 2020 and 144 kilonewtons (32,000 lb_{f}) by Chinese media.
- WS-10H – Naval variant equipped on two Shenyang J-15 prototypes. Limited to testing.
- WS-10B-3 – TVC variant
- WS-10C – "Updated" variant with stealthier serrated exhaust feathers and improved thrust of 142 kilonewtons (32,000 lb_{f}).
- WS-10G – thrust vectoring variant generating 152–155 kilonewtons (34,000–35,000 lb_{f}) of thrust during testing; intended for the Chengdu J-20
- WS-20 – high-bypass derivative for the Y-20 transport; 138 kilonewtons (31,000 lb_{f}) of thrust
- QD70 – 7MW class gas turbine engine developed from WS-10 for industrial & naval applications

== Applications ==
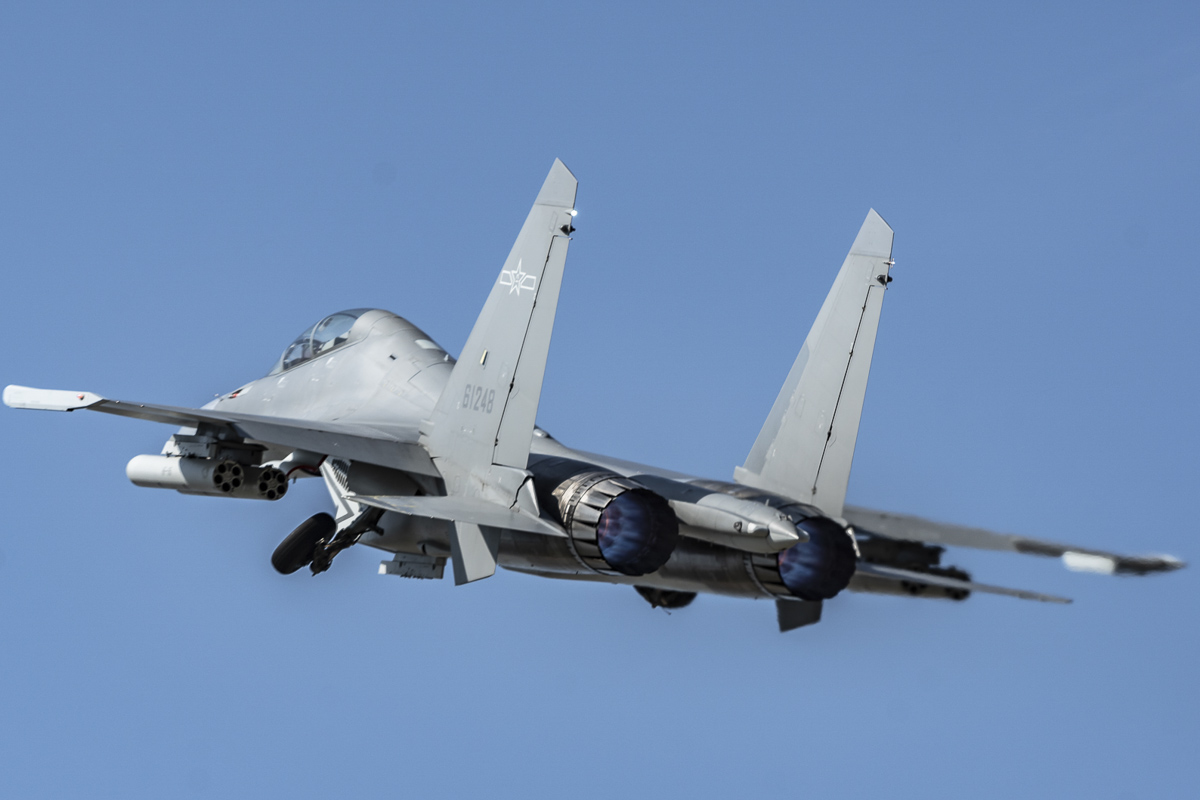
J-16 with WS-10 engines taking off

WS-10

- Shenyang J-8II (test)

WS-10A

- Chengdu J-10B (test)
- Shenyang J-11B
- Shenyang J-15
- Shenyang J-16

WS-10B

- Chengdu J-10C
- Shenyang J-16
- Chengdu J-20 (low rate initial production aircraft)

WS-10B-3

- Chengdu J-10B (demonstrator)
- Chengdu J-20B (prototype)

WS-10C

- Chengdu J-20 (2019–present)

== Specifications (WS-10) ==
Data from Janes

==== General characteristics ====
- Type: Afterburning turbofan
- Length:
- Diameter:
- Dry weight: 1,795 kg (3,957 lb)

==== Components ====
- Compressor:
- Combustors: annular

==== Performance ====
- Maximum thrust: 135 kilonewtons (30,000 lbf)
- Thrust-to-weight ratio: 8.8

== See also ==
Related development

- Shenyang WS-20

Comparable engines

- General Electric F110
- Saturn AL-31

Related lists

- List of aircraft engines
- List of Chinese aircraft engines
