= Woshan WS-6 =

Chinese aircraft engine development program

The WS-6 (Chinese: 涡扇-6; pinyin: Wōshàn-6; lit. 'Turbofan-6') was an unsuccessful turbofan development program from the People's Republic of China.

Development started as part of the "Aviation Industry Science and Technology Development Program for 1978-1985" with the larger goal of developing an industry capable of designing and building aircraft engines. No workable engines were produced when the program was cancelled in 1986.

Experience from the WS-6 was applied to the later Shenyang WS-10.
