= Aero Engine Corporation of China =

Chinese aircraft engine manufacturer

- Native name: 中国航空发动机集团
- Type: State-owned enterprise
- Industry: Aerospace engineering
- Predecessor: Aeroengine related divisions of Aviation Industry Corporation of China
- Founded: August 28, 2016; 10 years ago
- Headquarters: Haidian District, Beijing, China
- Area served: Worldwide
- Key people: Zhang Yujin (Chairman)
- Products: Aircraft engines, gas turbines
- Number of employees: 72000 (2025)
- Subsidiaries: Xi'an Aero-Engine Corporation; Shenyang Aeroengine Research Institute
- Website: www.aecc.cn

Aero Engine Corporation of China
- Simplified Chinese: 中国航空发动机集团
- Traditional Chinese: 中國航空發動機集團
Transcriptions
Standard Mandarin
- Hanyu Pinyin: Zhōngguó Hángkōng Fādòngjī Jítuán

Abbreviation
- Simplified Chinese: 中国航发
- Traditional Chinese: 中國航發
Transcriptions
Standard Mandarin
- Hanyu Pinyin: Zhōngguó Hángfā

Aero Engine Corporation of China (AECC) is a Chinese state-owned aerospace manufacturer focused on the design and development of aeroengine and related technology, comprising 46 affiliated companies including engine manufacturers, institutions and aero-engine factories.

== History ==
The company, which has its headquarters in the Haidian District of Beijing, was established on August 28, 2016 with the objective of creating a Chinese company capable of competing with Western engine manufacturers, including Rolls-Royce, General Electric, Pratt & Whitney, and Safran. At launch, AECC was to be capitalized with US$7.5 billion by Aviation Industry Corporation of China (AVIC) and Commercial Aircraft Corporation of China, Ltd. (COMAC), China's two main state aerospace companies.

In November 2020, U.S. President Donald Trump issued an executive order prohibiting U.S. companies and individuals owning shares in companies that the United States Department of Defense believe have links to the People's Liberation Army. The list produced by the United States Department of Defense as being linked to the People's Liberation Army includes AECC.

== See also ==
- List of Chinese aircraft engines
- Aviation Industry Corporation of China (AVIC)
- Commercial Aircraft Corporation of China (COMAC)
- United States sanctions against China
