= Four-engined jet aircraft =

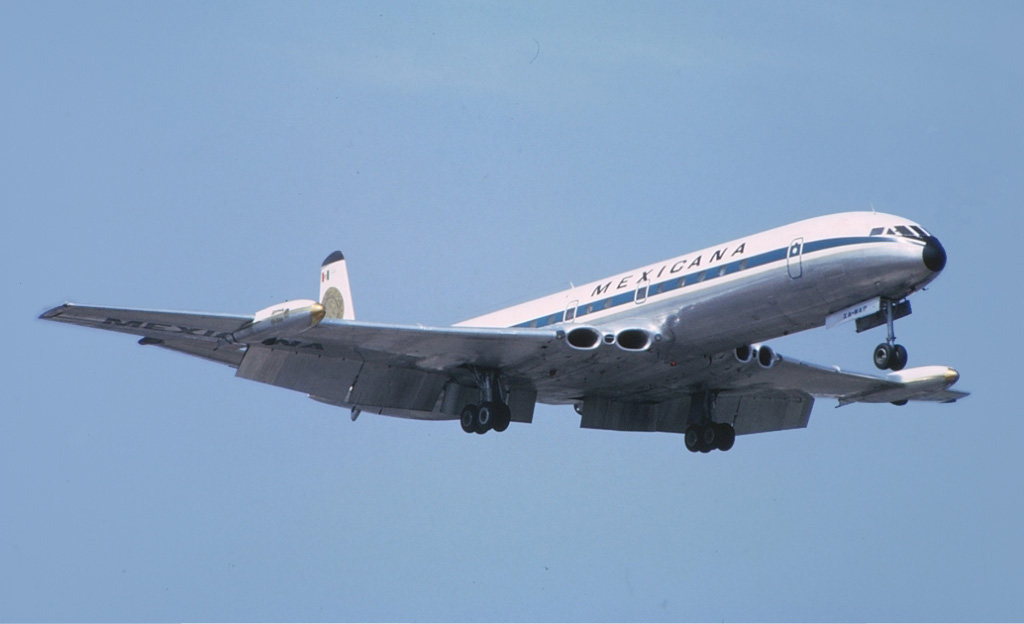
The de Havilland Comet, the first commercial jetliner, used four jet engines.

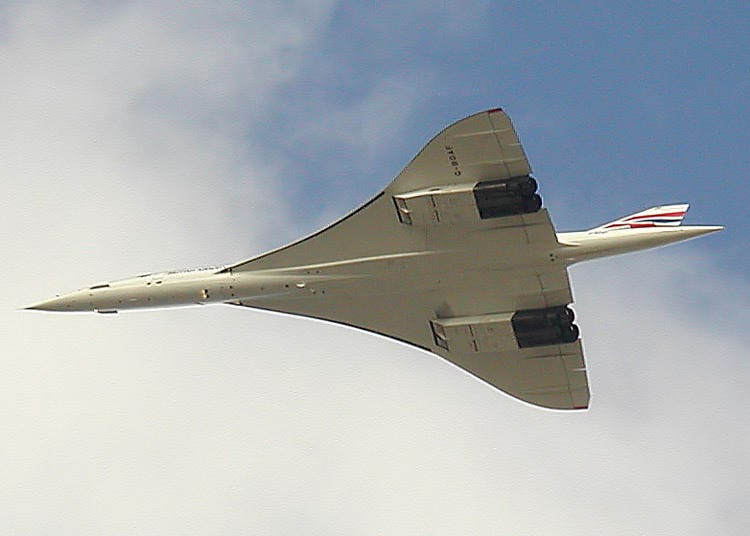
The supersonic Concorde with four underslung engines

A four-engined jet, sometimes called a quadjet, is a jet aircraft powered by four engines. The presence of four engines offers increased power and redundancy, allowing such aircraft to be used as airliners, freighters, and military aircraft (bomber, cargo, tanker). Many of the first purpose-built jet airliners of the 1950s had four engines, among which stands the de Havilland Comet, the world's first commercial jetliner. The quadjets were already challenged in the 1960s by trijets, and since the 1970s by wide-body aircraft with only two but big turbofan jet engines which are more efficient.

In the decades following their introduction, the use of "gas-guzzling four-engined" airliners has gradually declined due to a variety of factors, including ETOPS rules approving twin-engine jets to fly farther from diversion airports as reliability increased, and an increased emphasis on fuel efficiency.

== Design ==
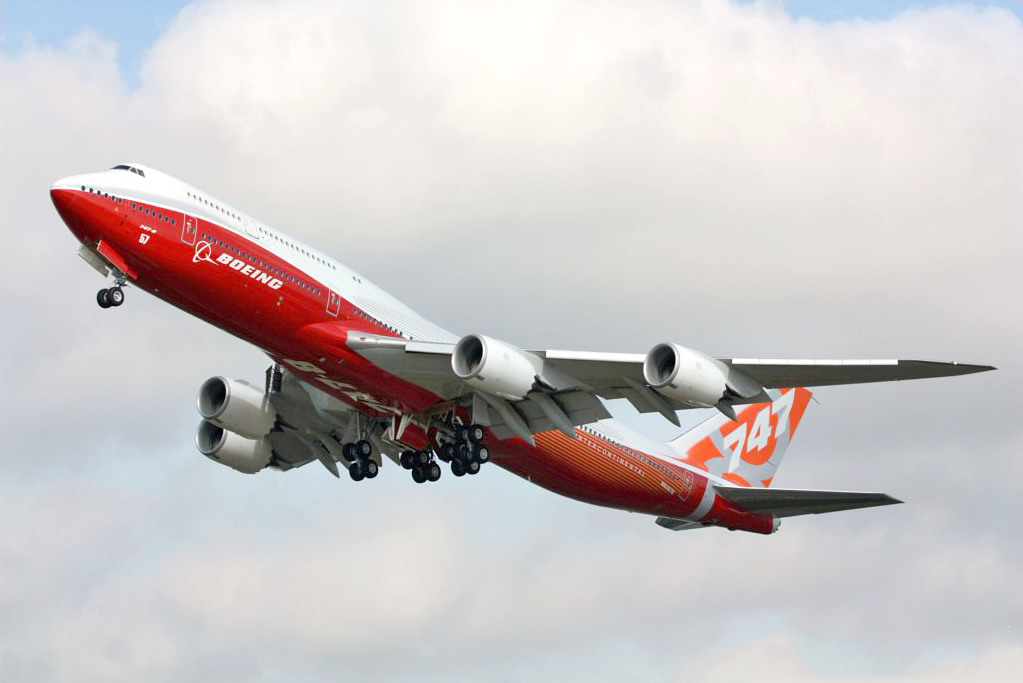
Podded engines mounted under the wings of a Boeing 747-8I.

=== Podded engines ===
The engines of a 4-engined aircraft are most commonly found in pods hanging from pylons underneath the wings. This can be observed in the Airbus A340, Airbus A380, Boeing 747 and Boeing 707. Many military airlifters also feature this design, including the Antonov An-124, Boeing C-17 Globemaster, and Lockheed C-5 Galaxy. In this location, the engines can act as a relieving load and reduce the structural weight of the wing by 15%. They are also in a more accessible location for maintenance or replacement. However, disadvantages include a higher risk of the engines ingesting foreign objects as they have a lower ground clearance, and a larger yawing moment during an engine failure. The supersonic airliner Concorde had its engines mounted in rectangular pods conformal to the underside of the wing, without any pylons. The omission of pylons reduces drag and eliminates the risk of them being overstressed.

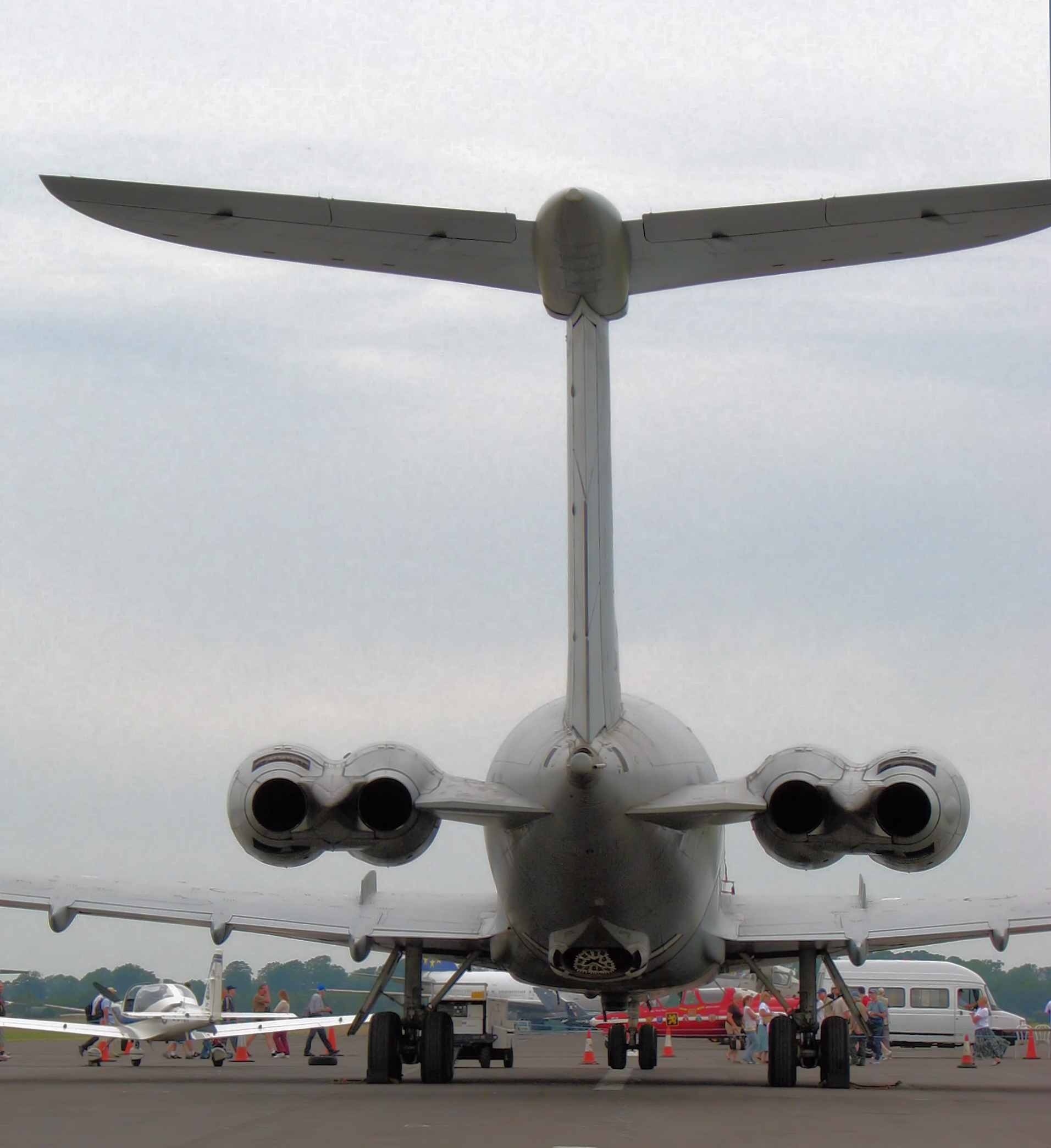
Rear view of a Vickers VC10, showing its four podded engines mounted on the rear fuselage

The four podded engines can also be attached to the rear fuselage, necessitating a T-tail. This reduces cabin noise and frees up more space on the wings for high-lift devices and fuel storage. The airflow over the wings is also undisturbed due to the absence of pylons. However, the rear-mounted engines shift the centre of gravity aft, and are located further from the fuel supply. The Ilyushin Il-62 and Vickers VC10 both have their four engines mounted in this configuration.

=== Buried engines ===
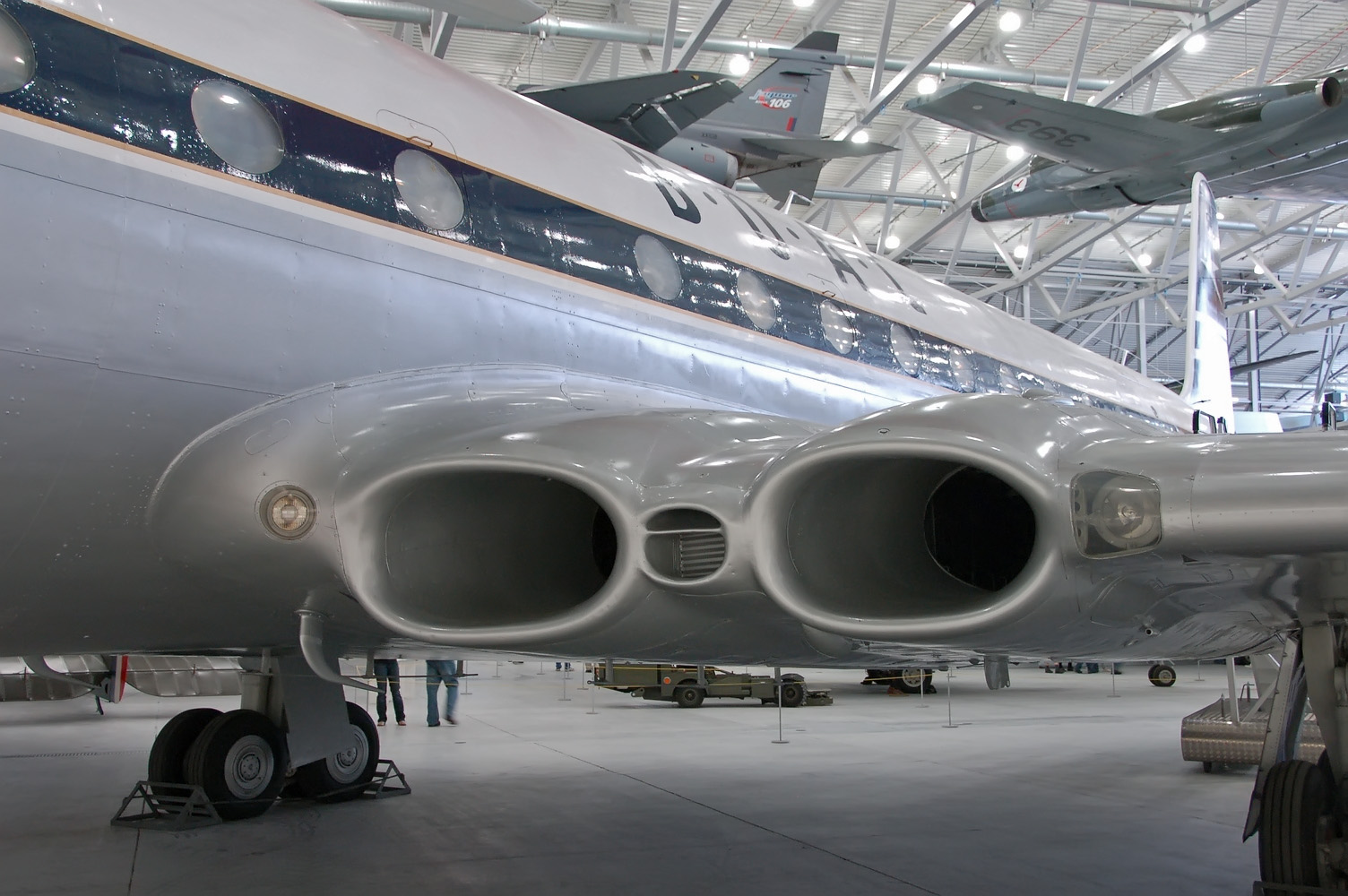
Intakes leading into the buried engines of a de Havilland Comet 4

Jet aircraft can also be designed with engines buried within the aircraft structure. The de Havilland Comet incorporated four turbojets buried inside its wing roots, the most common location for buried engines. This design reduces both drag and the risk of ingesting foreign objects, but increases the difficulty of maintenance and complicates the wing structure. The Northrop Grumman B-2 Spirit stealth strategic bomber has all four turbofans buried within its wing (as a flying wing, the wing is the main structural component). This reduces the heat signature of the engines by concealing the fans and minimizing the exhaust signature.

=== Other ===
The Hawker Siddeley Trident 3B not only has two engines in rear fuselage external nacelles, but also has other two engines mounted vertically in the tail. The aircraft was initially designed as trijet, but the Trident 3B added a fourth smaller engine above the center engine as additional power was required by the stretched fuselage, increased wing chord and raised gross weight.

== Advantages and drawbacks ==
=== Advantages ===
A major advantage of having four engines is the redundancy offered, leading to increased safety. A single engine failure is much less significant as the three remaining engines can usually provide sufficient power to comfortably reach a diversion airport or continue the journey, depending on factors such as the severity of the malfunction, altitude, fuel load, and weather conditions. With the increased reliability of jet engines, engine failures rates can be as low as 1 in-flight shutdown per 100,000 engine-hours, reducing the significance of this advantage.

During a single-engine failure, the amount of power lost with four engines is proportionately lower than three or two engines. This is because three of the four engines will still be functioning, constituting a 25% reduction in thrust, compared to 33% for trijets and 50% for twinjets. This can be observed in the following example involving the Boeing 747-400 quadjet, McDonnell Douglas MD-11 trijet, and Boeing 767-300ER twinjet. With all engines operative at maximum takeoff weight, all three aircraft have the power to weight ratios of approximately 1 to 3.4. Following the failure of one engine, the power to weight ratio drops to 1 to 4.7 (747-400), 1 to 5.5 (MD-11), and 1 to 6.6 (767-300ER). The Boeing 747-400 experiences the least degradation in performance during an engine failure, making it safer to continue flying.

Fitting an aircraft with four engines also increases power, enabling more passengers, heavier payloads, and increased performance. This was especially important for first-generation jet airliners, as the low-bypass turbofans and turbojets of the time were much weaker compared to modern high-bypass turbofans. The Pratt & Whitney JT3D from 1958 had a thrust output of 76 kilonewtons (17,000 lbf), For second-generation jet airlines, the first high-bypass turbofans that were developed would be shared by different jet airliner configurations, such as when the Boeing 747, McDonnell Douglas DC-10, and Boeing 767 were all powered by the General Electric CF6. The additional power from the fourth engine gave the 747 quadjet a longer range and heavier payload over DC-10 trijet which in turn held such advantages over the 767 twinjet. Further advancements in high-bypass turbofan technology and subsequent relaxation in airline safety rules made the quadjet and trijet nearly obsolete for passenger services, as their range and payload could be covered more efficiently with large twinjets powered with purpose-designed engines such as the Boeing 777 twinjet with the General Electric GE90 (not used on any other jet airliner). Modern engines like the GE90 can produce over 440 kilonewtons (100,000 lbf) of thrust, and configuring the 777 for two GE90 engines results in simplified operational complexity of less maintenance and reduced fuel consumption compared to mounting four engines to produce the equivalent total output.

The largest four-engined jet airliners are distinguished with having the highest passenger capacities—the Airbus A380 can carry up to 853 passengers in a single class layout. This allows them to satisfy demand on extremely busy routes, and when filled with passengers to distribute the cost, they can be very profitable.

=== Drawbacks ===
Four smaller engines consume more fuel than two larger ones, driving up operational costs. With jet fuel a large part of total costs, this makes quadjets less attractive to airlines and many are shifting their attention towards more efficient aircraft types.

Four engines also incur higher maintenance costs, as each one needs to undergo regular inspections and servicing. Approximately half of the airliner maintenance costs are derived from routine engine maintenance, so the additional expense in maintaining four engines is significant.

The ability of a very large aircraft to carry a large number of passengers can be a drawback when the seats are not filled. This is an emerging trend, particularly because the airline industry has been transitioning from a spoke–hub model to a point-to-point model. In the spoke-hub model, passengers are moved from smaller outlying points and concentrated at large hubs. This introduces a need for high-capacity aircraft. Conversely, the point-to-point model transports passengers directly from origin to destination, spreading them out across different routes and requiring fewer seats on the servicing aircraft. Especially with the recent appearance of low-cost carriers which operate many point-to-point flights, it is more difficult to fill the seats of the largest airliners. For this reason, the wide-body fleets of these airlines are dominated by lower capacity, long range twinjets such as the A330 and 787.

== History ==
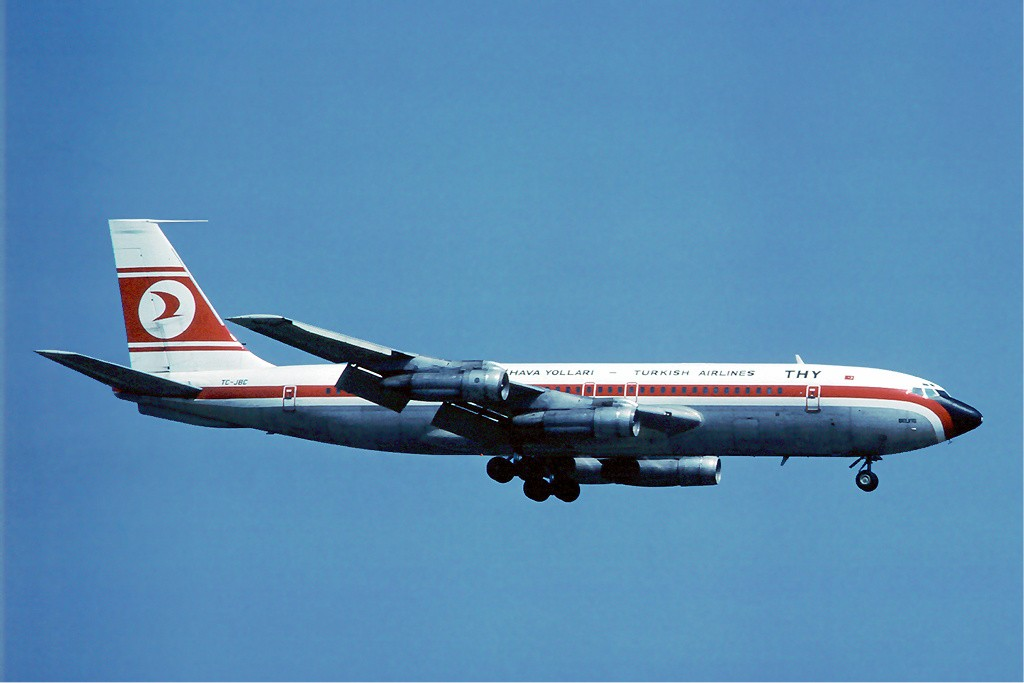
A Boeing 707-120B, the earliest production variant of the 707

=== Early history ===
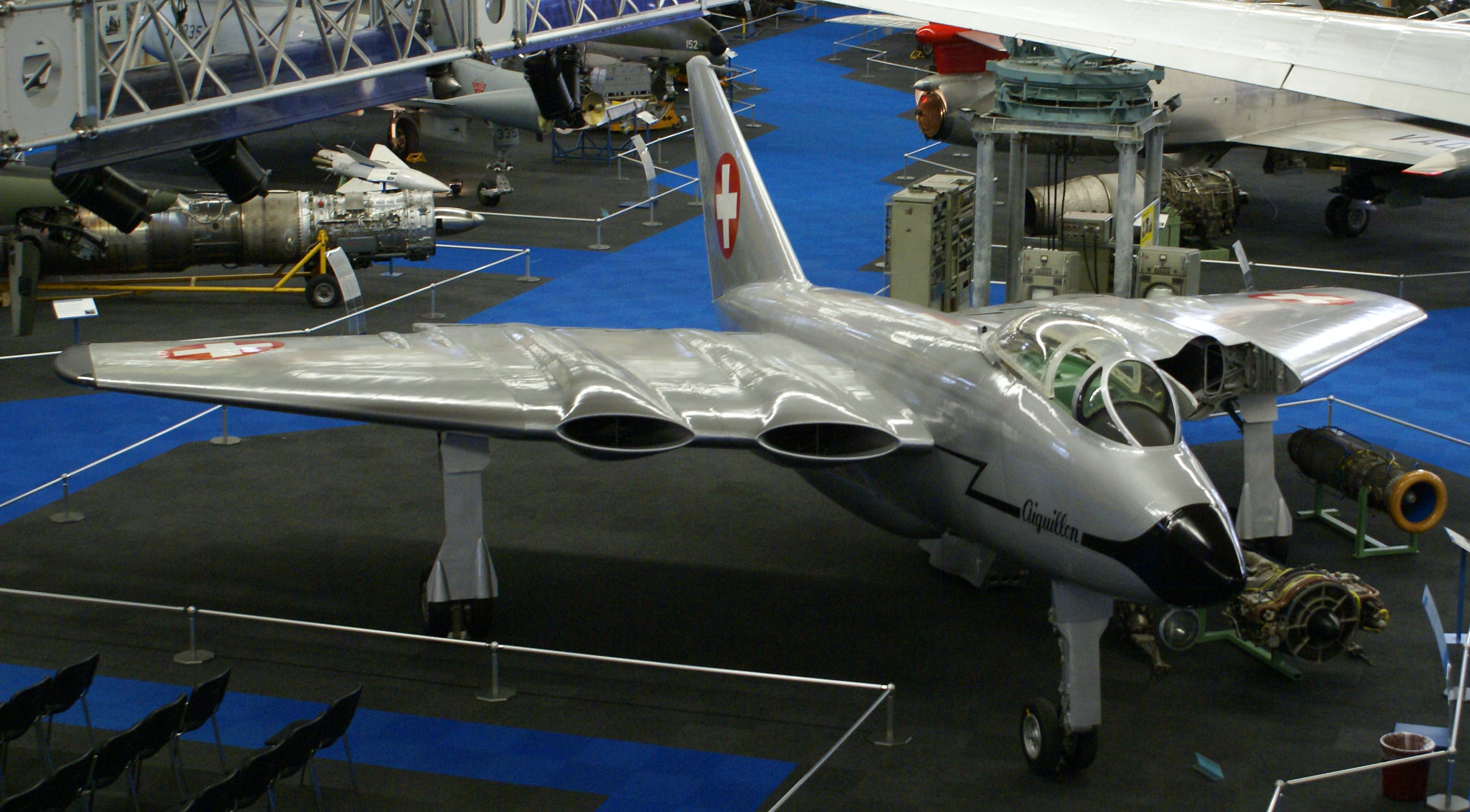
The EFW N-20 was a proposal for a quadjet fighter aircraft

Prior to the Jet Age, airliners were powered by piston engines. Engine failures were relatively common, so providing redundancy with four engines was important for long range flights. This need extended into the beginning of the Jet Age, and combined with the limited thrust available from early jet engines, it was most practical to design large jet airliners with four engines. The first commercial jet aircraft was the four-engined De Havilland Comet, which first flew in 1949. However, due to a series of fatal metal fatigue accidents between 1953 and 1954, the Comet was grounded. This greatly tarnished its reputation and it was the later airliners that truly benefited from the subsequent improvements. In 1958, Boeing introduced the 707 and a year later, Douglas rolled out its DC-8, both types also with four engines. Both were very successful and the 707 in particular is credited with advancing the Jet Age. The large airliners flourished during this period, frequently operating on both domestic and international routes.

=== Long-haul dominance in 1960s-70s ===
By the 1960s it became apparent that having four engines reduced fuel efficiency. This was not an issue for long-haul routes which carried 300 or more passengers for 8 to 12 hours, allowing for a high cost-to-passenger-mile ratio. On the other hand, the large four-engined types were less suited for frequent short-haul services, which demanded multiple take-offs and landings daily, costing more fuel while also typically carrying fewer passengers per flight. This prompted the development of large trijets and twinjets. Due to limitations in engine technology, twinjets of this era were small and had relatively short range. The FAA's 60-Minute Rule also prevented them from flying farther than 60 minutes away from diversion airports due to their lower engine redundancy. Trijets represented a compromise between fuel efficiency and redundancy. In 1969, Boeing launched the 747. Nicknamed the "Jumbo Jet", it was the first wide-body airliner, able to carry significantly more passengers than any other aircraft. Its capacity and performance were unmatched, even after the launch of wide-body trijet competition in the form of the McDonnell Douglas DC-10 and Lockheed L-1011 TriStar.

Within its own category in commercial aviation, the supersonic airliners Tupolev Tu-144 and Concorde began service in 1975 and 1976. The Concorde's four Rolls-Royce/Snecma Olympus 593 turbojets allowed it to cruise at twice the speed of sound. At the time of inception it was regarded as the future of air transportation. However, in large part due to high operating costs and noise issues, Tu-144 was retired soon, and Concorde was limited to trans-Atlantic routes and never achieved the predicted level of success.

When the BAe 146 was introduced in 1983, it was unusual because it was a four-engined short range regional airliner. Its design ultimately enabled quieter operation and short take off and landing capabilities.

=== Gradual decline due to competition from twinjets ===
In the 1980s, the increased reliability and available power of jet engines enabled twinjets to safely fly on one engine. This prompted the introduction of ETOPS ratings for twinjets, allowing them to circumvent the 60-Minute Rule and fly on transoceanic routes previously serviced by four-engined types. The advantage of redundancy brought by four engines was no longer necessary and they could no longer compete with the lower fuel consumption and maintenance costs of twinjets with higher-powered engines. All but the largest four-engined types, such as the Boeing 747, became uneconomical and this led to the retirement of the ageing 707 and DC-8 fleets for passenger service. Nonetheless, Boeing rolled out the 747-400 in 1989, which enjoyed high capacities (over 300 passengers) and long range, a combination still unmatched by twinjets at the time, making this the most commercially successful 747 variant. Airbus, after ending collaboration talks with McDonnell Douglas who went on to produce the MD-11 long-range trijet, instead launched the A340 quadjet in 1993 as a long-range derivative of the A330 twinjet as their initial variants shared the same fuselage and wing.

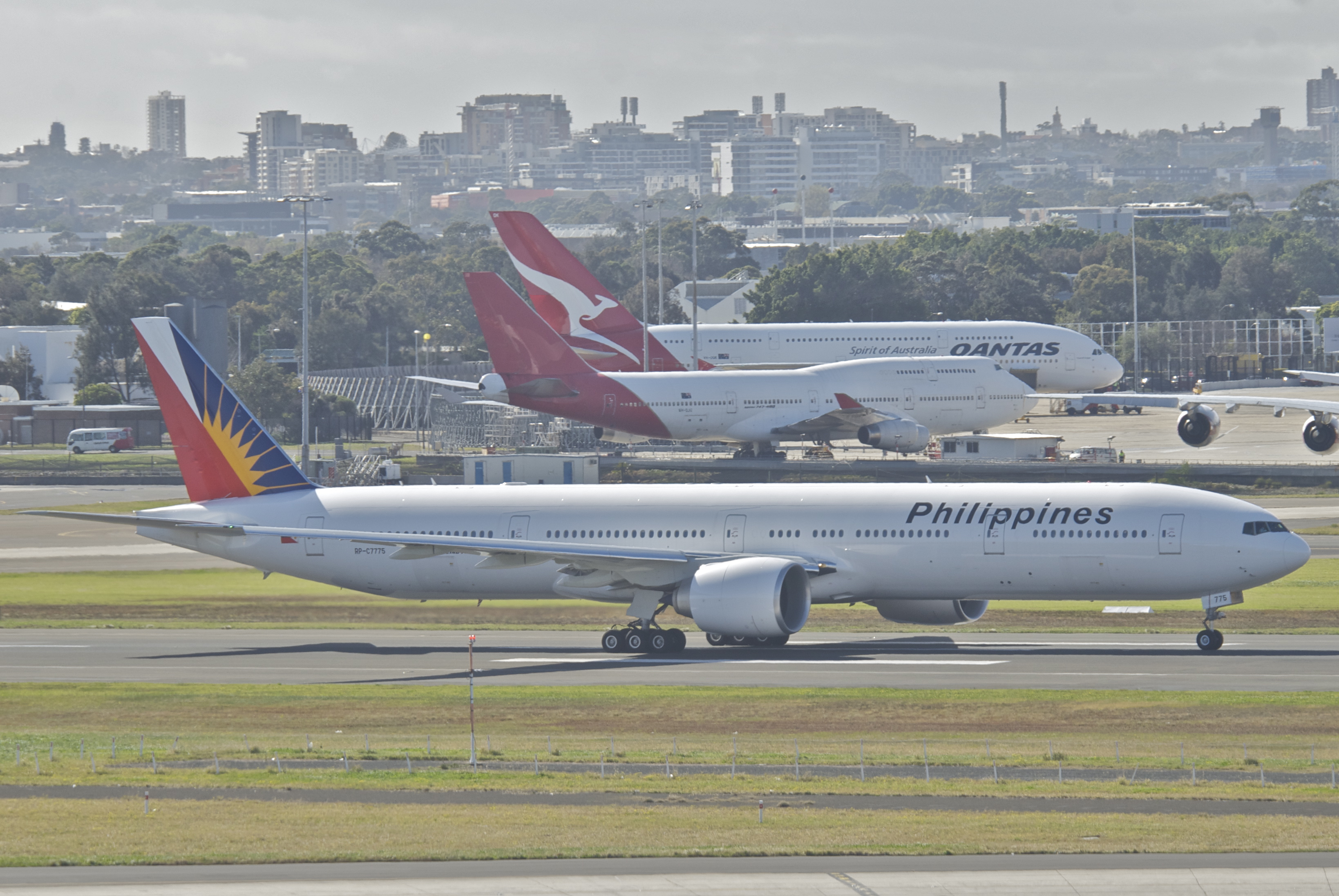
Large twins such as this Boeing 777-300ER can almost match the capacity of the largest four-engined types with superior efficiency.

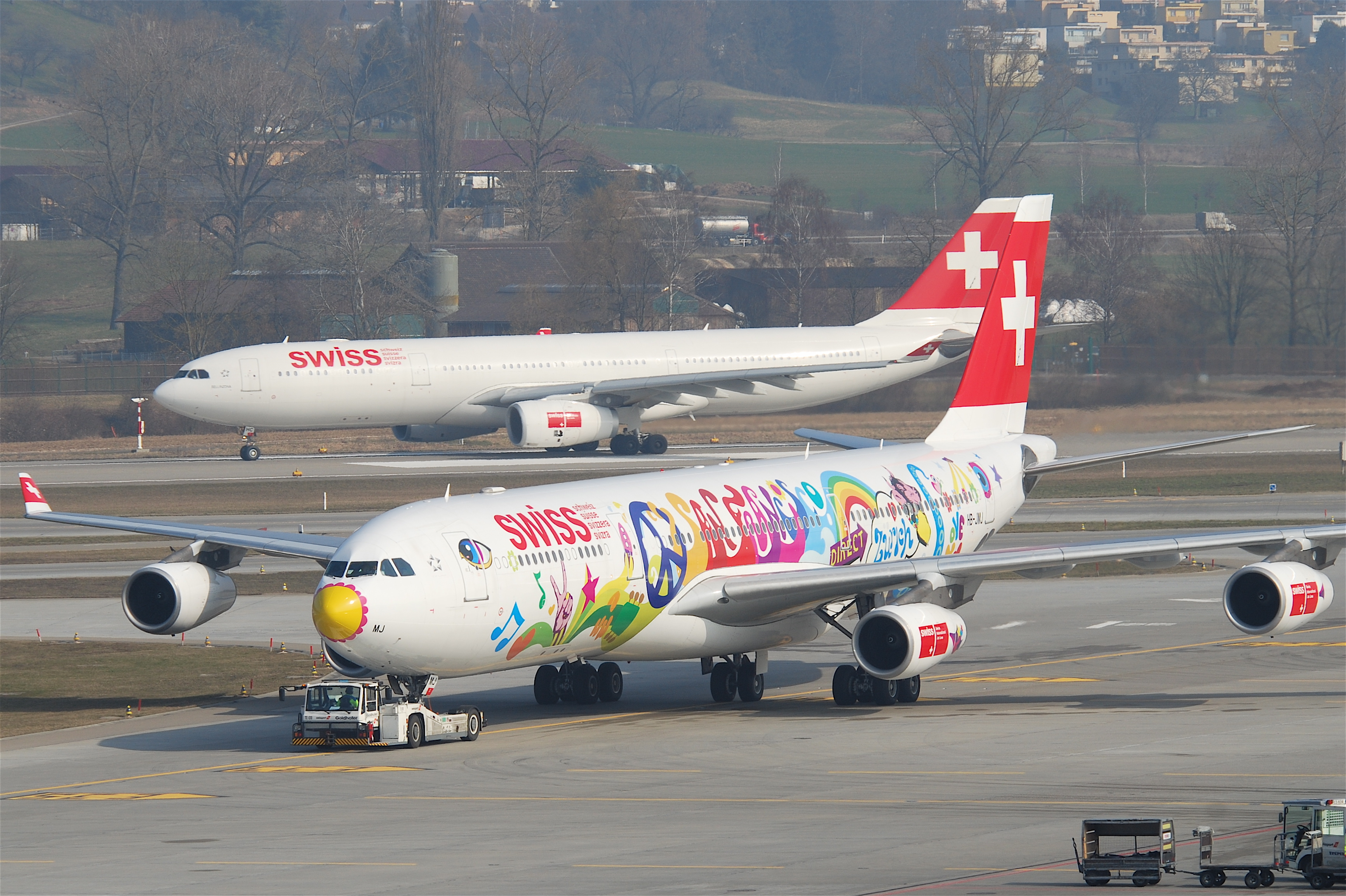
Utilizing the same wing and fuselage platform, Airbus intended to introduce the four-engined A340 for long-haul flights and the two-engined A330 for shorter routes. While the A330 itself has evolved to be more capable of long-haul flights (with the shortened variant A330-200), the A340 has quickly been phased out in favor of more efficient two-engine solutions like its direct successor Airbus A350 or the Boeing 777 and Boeing 787.

Between the 1970 and the 1990s, twinjets, trijets, and quadjets shared engines of similar output, such as when the DC-10, MD-11, Boeing 767, and Airbus A300, A310, and A330, and Boeing 747 all had variants powered by the widespread General Electric CF6, so at the time additional engines were needed for larger capacities and longer range. The major advantages of three and four engines became much less significant when the twin-engined Boeing 777 was introduced in 1995, equipped with the purpose-designed General Electric GE90 engine developed from further advancements in high-bypass turbofan technology. The original 777-200 could seat upwards of 300 passengers, a significant increase upon existing twinjets such as the 767, which could typically only seat 200-300 passengers.

By the early 2000s, the only remaining advantage of the largest types was their ability to carry more passengers than the largest twinjets. In the years following the September 11 attacks, the increase in fuel prices and decline in the aviation industry heightened the need to minimise operating costs and expenditures. The subsequent development of the second-generation 777 (particularly the very popular 777-300ER) pushed the passenger capacity to just under 400, approaching the 747's capacity and matching the A340's range, while being more efficient and incurring lower engine maintenance costs. Production of the 747-400 passenger variant ceased by 2005 and deliveries of the A340 dropped to 11 per year, as they faced competition from more efficient and comparably capable twinjets.

Airbus, not seeing much success with updated A340-500/600 variants powered by the Rolls-Royce Trent 500, went for the all-new A350XWB to compete against the 777 and 787 Dreamliner. Boeing has continued to develop the third-generation of the 777, the Boeing 777X, which can approach the latest quadjets (the Airbus A380 and Boeing 747-8, see below) in range and capacity. Compared to the 747-8I, the upcoming 777X (particularly the 777-9 "mini-jumbo jet") is projected to have a lower fuel cost per seat mile and greater cargo capacity though it has a lower passenger capacity and higher list price; consequently, the 777-9X has totaled more orders than the 747-8I due to airlines placing a high value on fuel efficiency.

=== Last quadjet designs ===
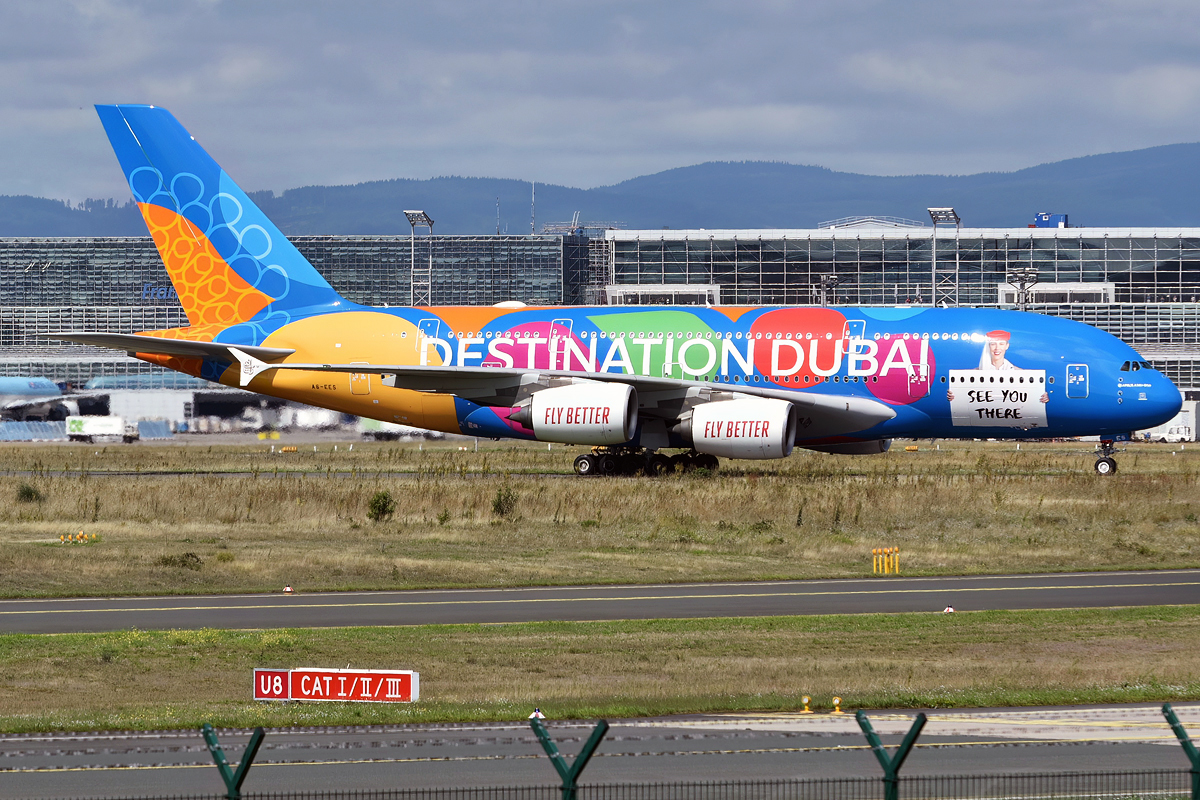
An Emirates Airbus A380 in special livery. The A380 is the world's largest airliner.

The use of four engines was invigorated in 2005 when Airbus introduced the A380, currently the world's largest airliner. It was designed for routes with ultra-high demand, typically seating 575 passengers in two full-length decks. However, as of 2018, Airbus has only fulfilled a quarter of its initial projected figure of 1,200 sales over two decades. This can be attributed to a modern trend towards point-to-point travel using smaller but highly efficient twinjets such as the Airbus A350 and Boeing 787, as opposed to a spoke–hub model which favours massive aircraft such as the A380. The largest operator of the A380, Emirates, is the only airline to be financially successful on its A380 routes because its primary hub is situated at Dubai International Airport, where many long-haul routes have their stopovers. This makes it easier for Emirates to fill the seats of its A380s. After Emirates reduced its last order in February 2019, Airbus announced that A380 production would end in 2021.

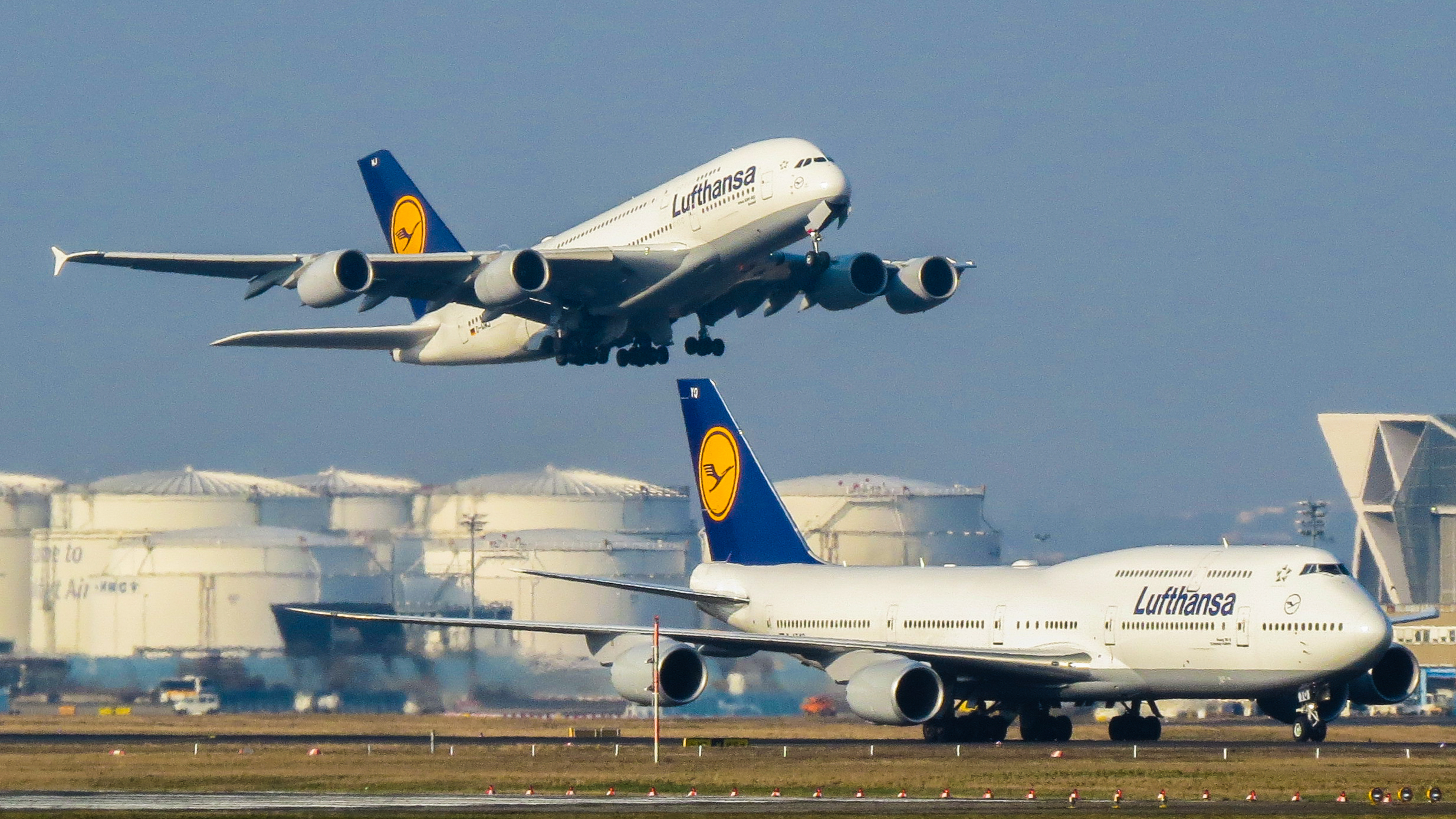
Lufthansa operates both the Airbus A380 and Boeing 747-8, the latest quadjets produced by their respective manufacturers.

In response to the A380, Boeing introduced the 747-8 in 2011 as a successor to the 747-400. The 747-8I passenger variant has only received 50 orders as of 2018, while the 747-8F freighter variant has been more successful with over 100 orders. As of 2018, the 747-8F is unmatched in range and payload, making it an option for cargo carriers.

After the Airbus A380 ended production, the Boeing 747-8 also stopped production with the last delivery taking place on January 31, 2023, meaning no double-deck passenger jets were any longer in production. Boeing attributed the retirement of their 747 fleets to the effect of the COVID-19 pandemic.

== Types currently in production ==
=== Airliners ===
- Ilyushin Il-96 (Limited)

=== Military ===
- Ilyushin Il-76
- Kawasaki P-1
- Xi'an Y-20
- Tupolev Tu-160
