= S-duct =

Type of aircraft jet engine intake duct

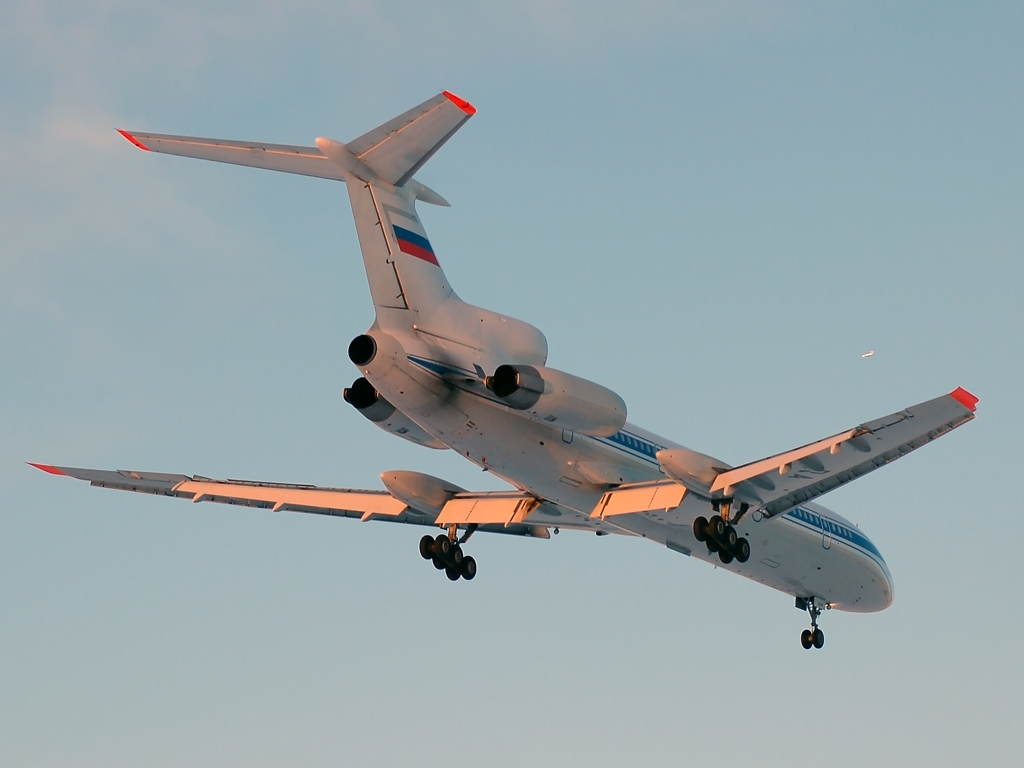
The central engine on the Tu-154 is fed through an S-duct

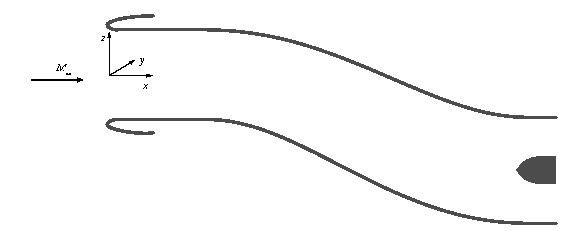
S-duct geometry

An S-duct (or serpentine inlet) is a type of jet engine intake duct used in several types of trijet aircraft. In this configuration, the intake is in the upper rear center of the aircraft, above or below the stabilizer, while the exhaust and engine is at the rear of the aircraft. The S-duct is located in the tail, or empennage, of the aircraft. The shape of the S-duct is distinctive and easily recognized, and was used in several aircraft, beginning in 1962 with the Hawker Siddeley Trident. The Dassault Falcon 8X and Dassault Falcon 900 business jets are the only commercial aircraft in production that use the S-duct design.

== Benefits and drawbacks ==
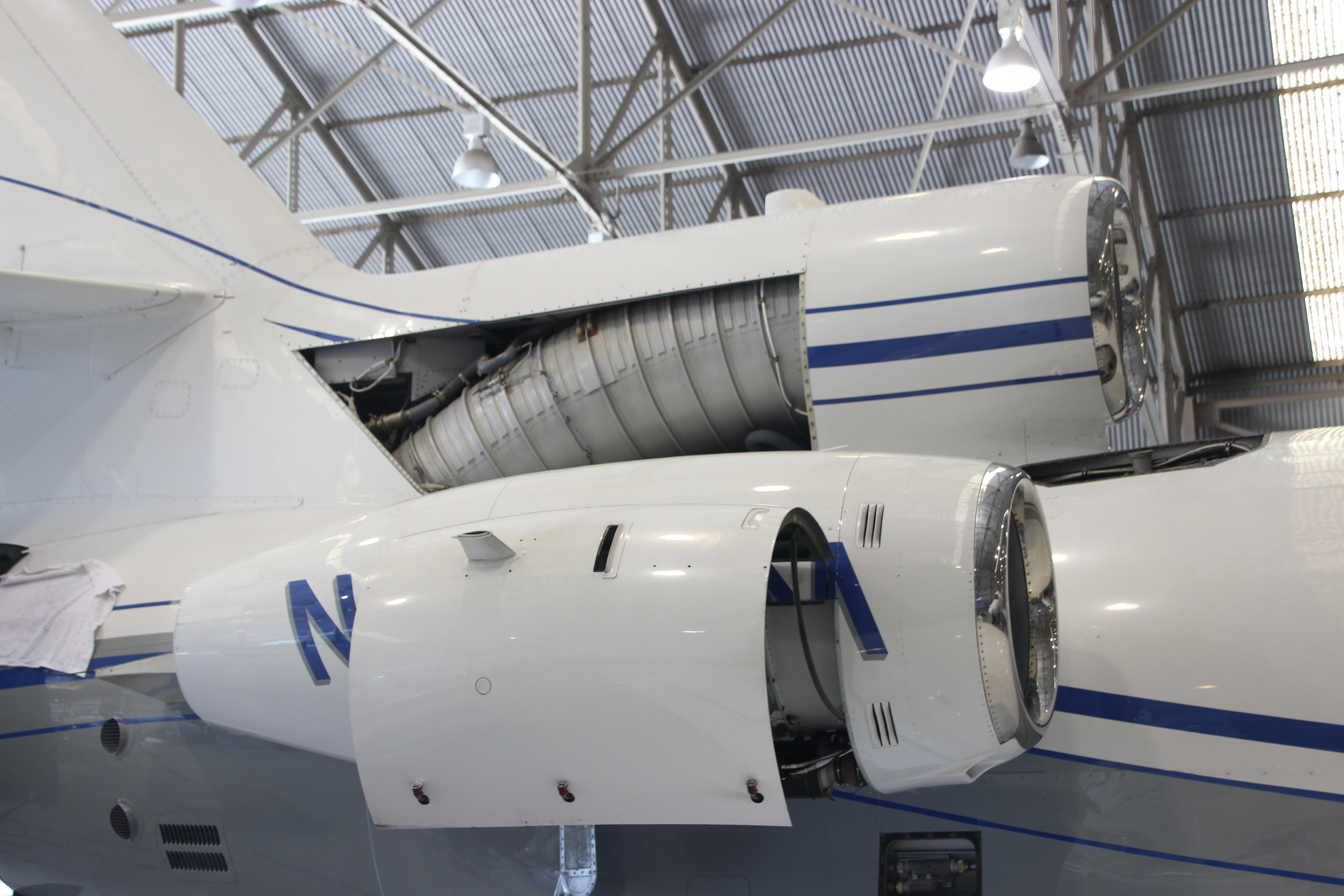

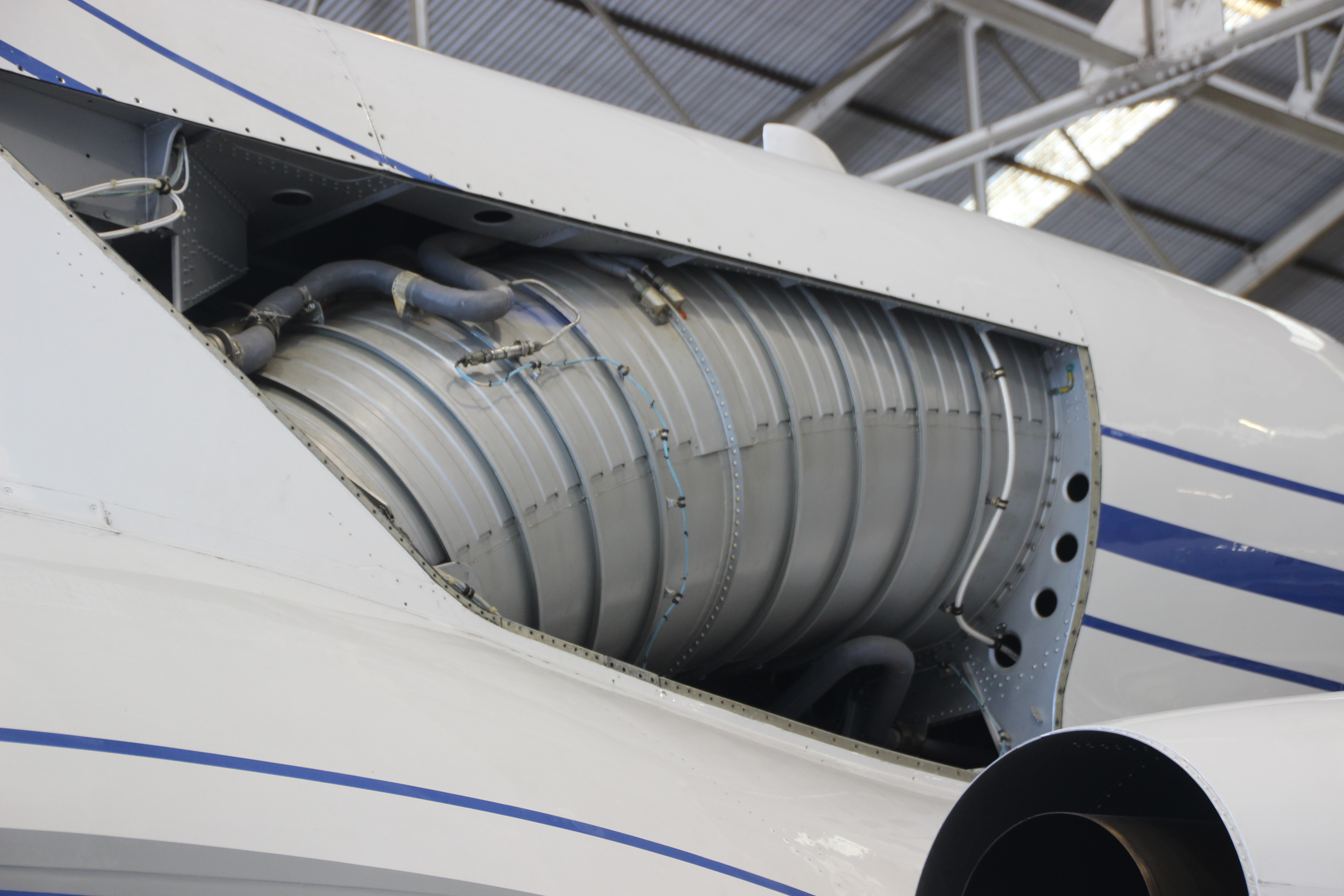
Dassault Falcon 50 S-duct

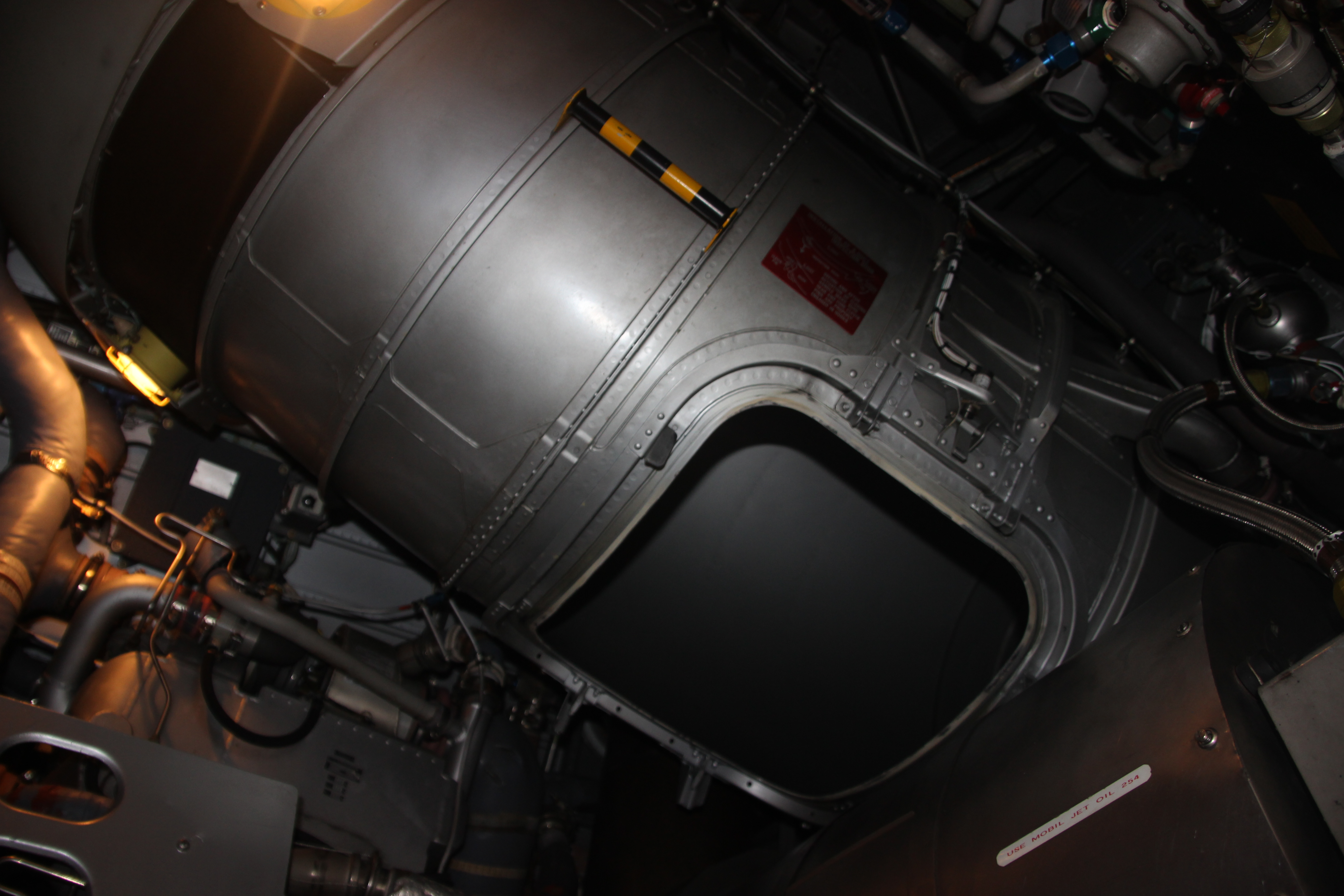
Falcon 50 S-duct inside the aircraft's rear fuselage, with an access hatch removed

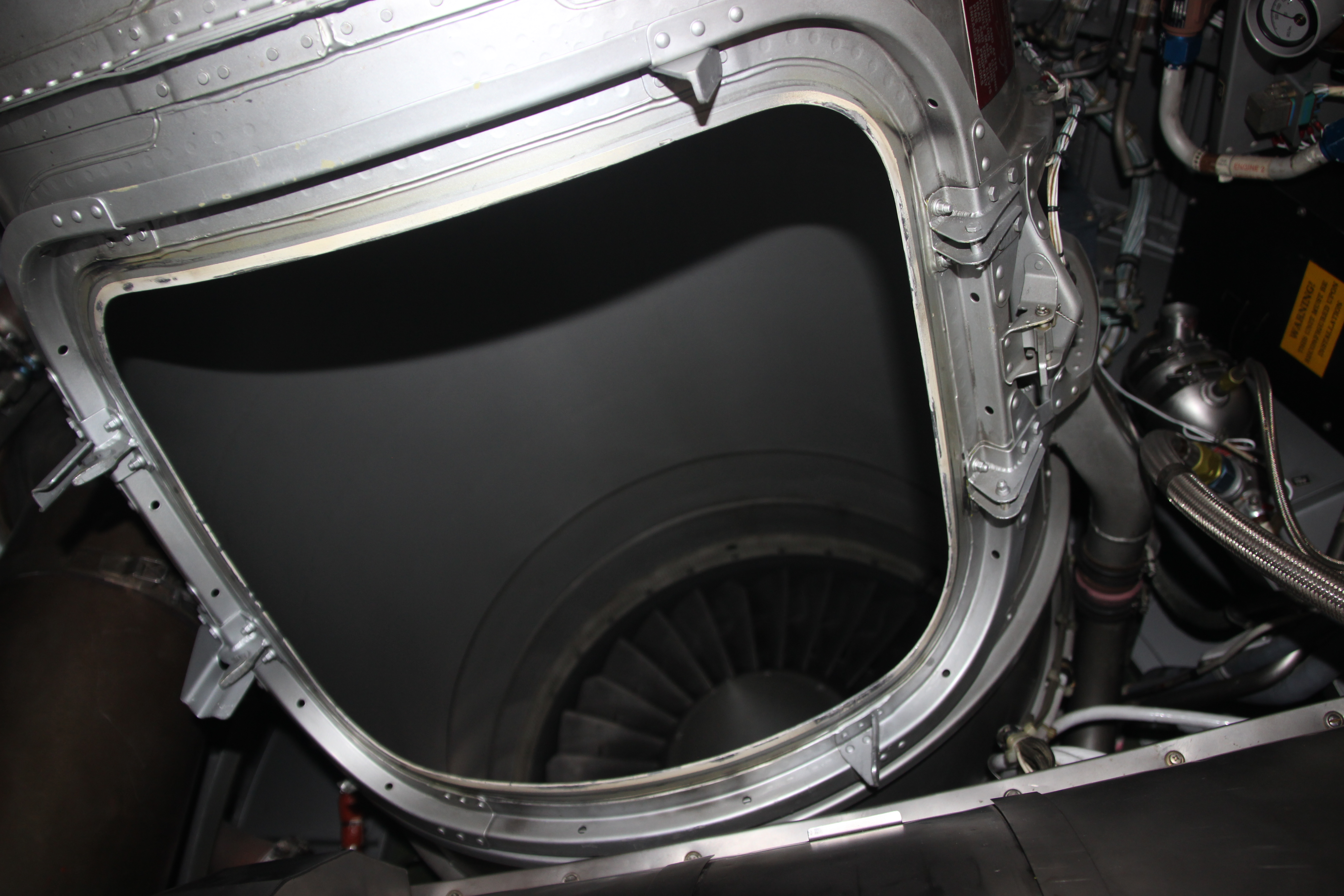
View looking inside the S-duct with the front fan of the engine visible

The S-duct was invented as a solution for positioning the central engine on trijets. The S-duct is easier to service than alternative trijet designs. Most trijet designs opted for the S-duct layout. Only the McDonnell Douglas DC-10 and MD-11 trijets' designers chose not to use the S-duct and go with a "straight-through" layout. The straight-through layout leaves the engine high above the ground, making access difficult. The straight-through layout also increases total aerodynamic drag by 2–4%.

Compared to the straight-through design on the DC-10 and MD-11, the S-duct allows a shorter fin and a rudder closer to the longitudinal axis.

On the Lockheed L-1011 TriStar, engineers were able to maintain engine performance comparable with straight-through designs by limiting the curve of the S-duct to less than a quarter of the radius of the engine intake diameter. The S-duct design also reduced the total empty aircraft weight. The research undertaken during the design of the L-1011 indicated that losses of using an S-duct were more than compensated for by the savings.

The S-shaped duct is a complicated and costly design. Since modern jet engines have more power and reliability than those of the 1970s and can safely power the aircraft with only two engines, the trijet design is no longer used for large commercial airliners but is used on the latest Dassault Falcon 7X and Falcon 8X business jets in order to provide more total thrust while enabling the continued use of smaller engines in the 15–30 kN (3,400–6,700 lb_{f}) class with which Falcons have historically been designed. In international aviation regulations the triple engine layout is also considered inherently safer for the increased redundancy, which allows the use of certain airfields at high elevation only for aircraft with more than two engines.

== On stealth aircraft ==
The S-duct is also used on combat aircraft, where it has the advantage of blocking the front section of the jet engine from radar beams increasing the stealth capability. The spinning compressor blades would produce a strong radar signature return, compared to the smooth sides of the duct.

== List of S-duct aircraft ==
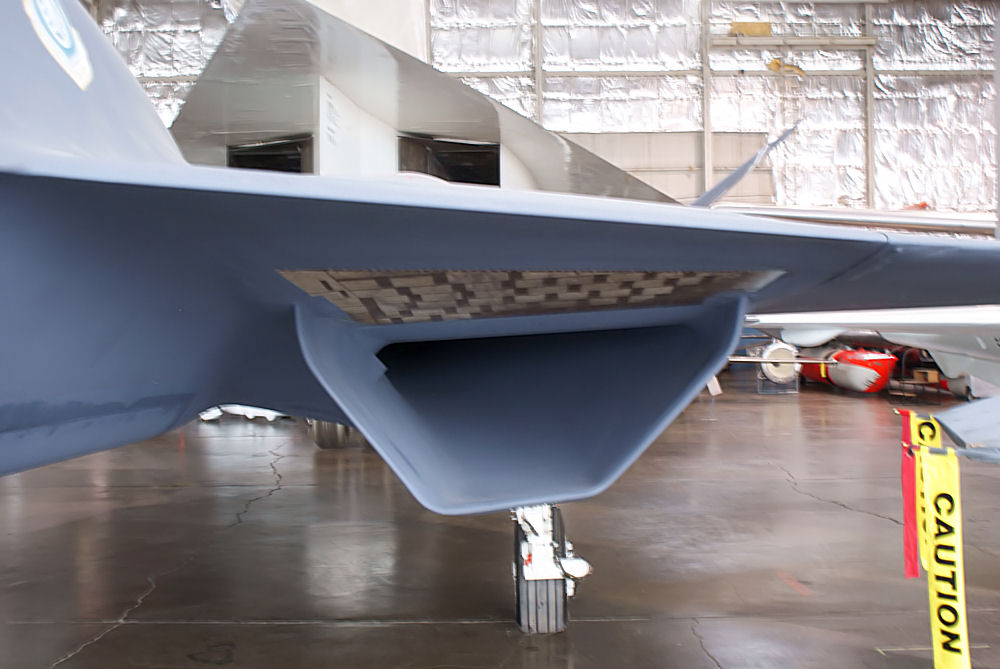
YF-23 S-duct engine air intake

Currently produced aircraft with an S-ducts:

- Chengdu J-20
- Dassault Falcon 7X
- Dassault Falcon 900
- Dassault Rafale
- Eurofighter Typhoon
- Lockheed Martin F-35 Lightning II
- Rockwell B-1 Lancer
- Shenyang J-35

Previously produced aircraft with an S-ducts:

- Boeing 727
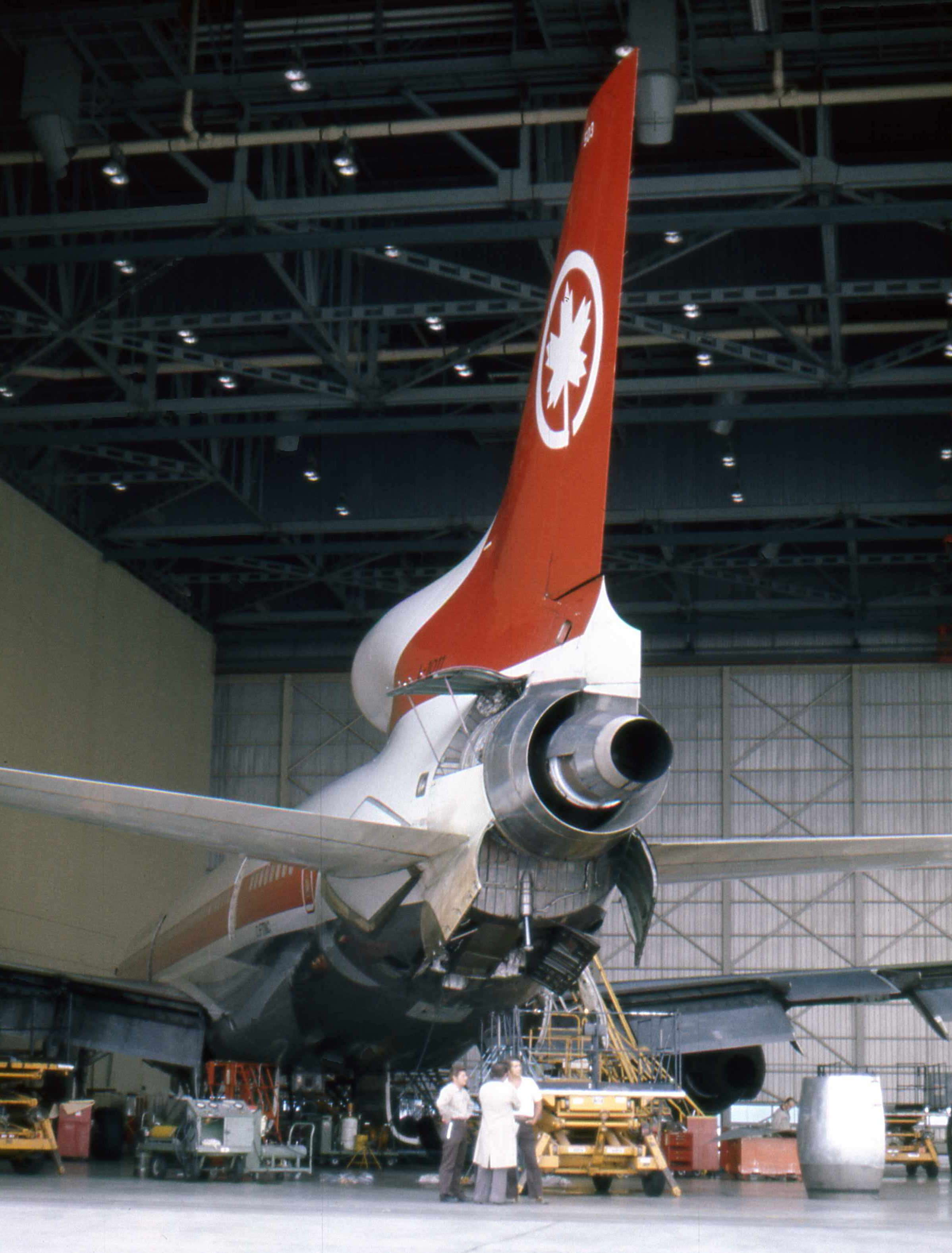
  S-duct of Lockheed L-1011 TriStar rear view
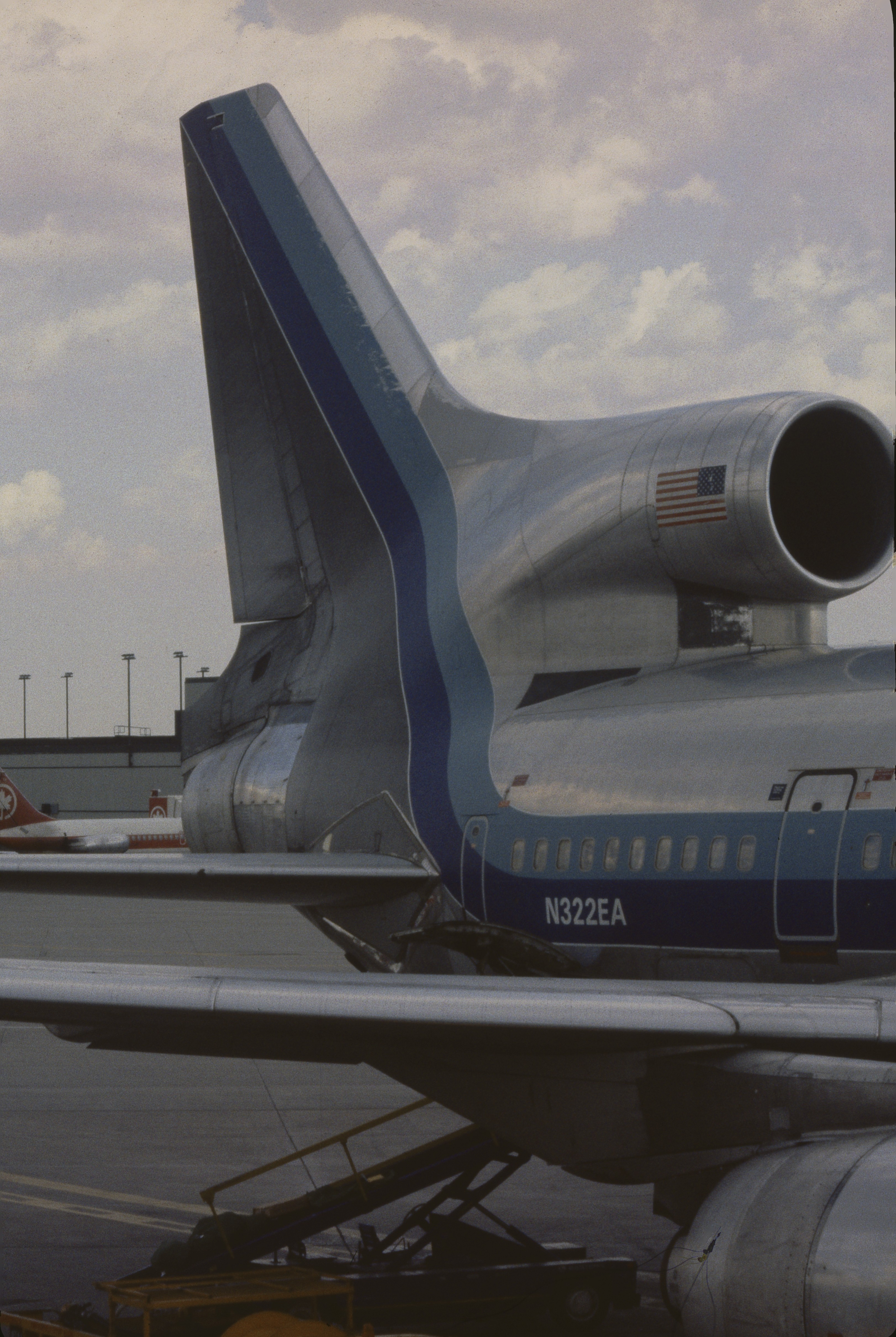
  Lockheed L-1011 TriStar S-duct side view
- Dassault Falcon 50
- Epic Victory
- Hawker Siddeley Trident
- IAI Lavi (inverse S-duct, with underside intake and the nozzles on upper fuselage)
- Lockheed L-1011 TriStar
- Lockheed Martin F-22 Raptor
- Lockheed YF-22
- Mikoyan Project 1.44
- Northrop Grumman B-2 Spirit
- Northrop YF-23 (inverse S-duct)
- Short SC.1
- Sukhoi Su-47
- Tupolev Tu-154
- Tupolev Tu-154M
- Yakovlev Yak-40
- Yakovlev Yak-42

The Boeing 747-300 Trijet (not to be confused with the later 747-300) was designed with an S-duct layout, but never built.

== See also ==
- Components of jet engines
- Variable cycle engine
