= Twinjet =

Jet aircraft powered by two jet engines

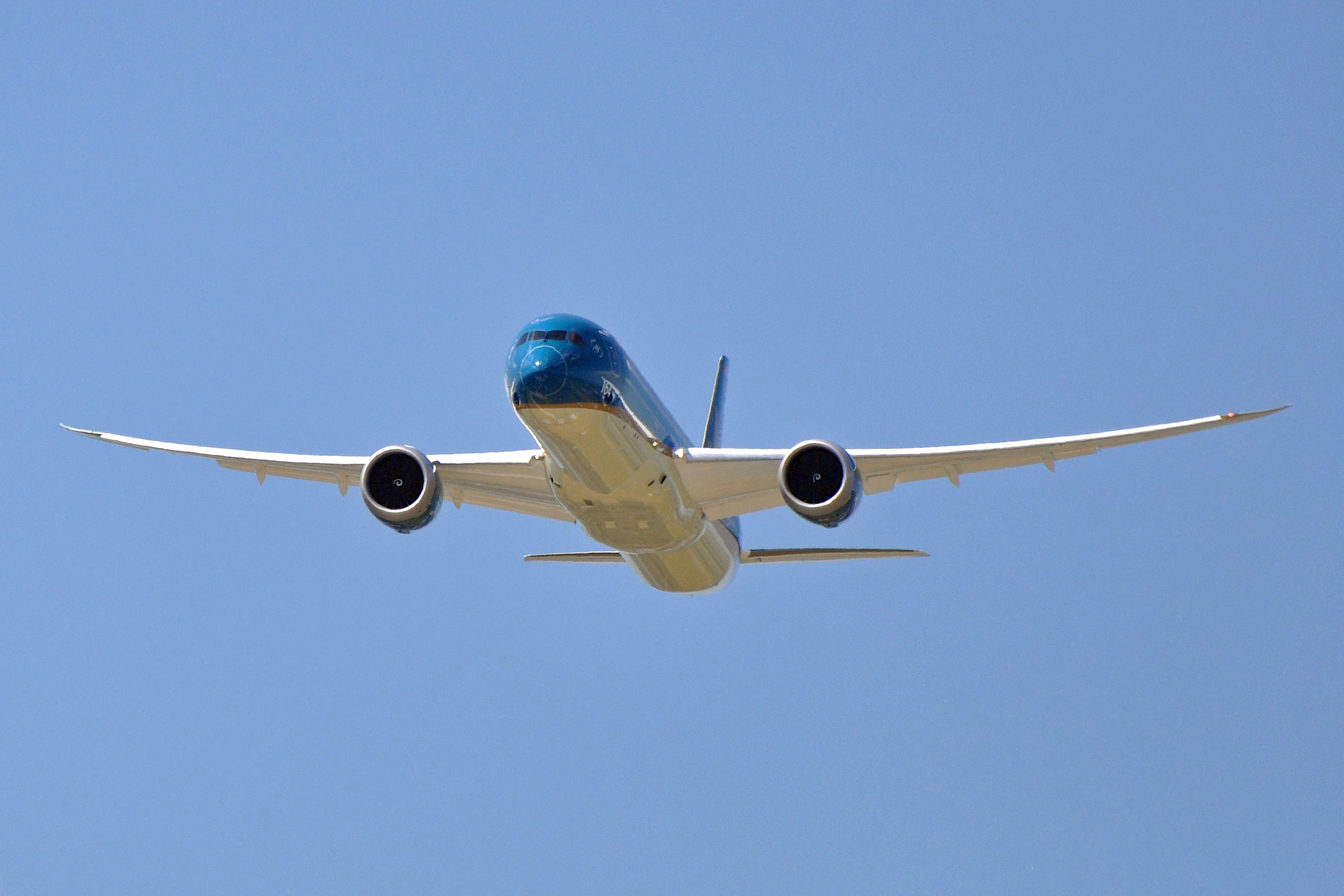
Boeing 787 Dreamliner Twinjet

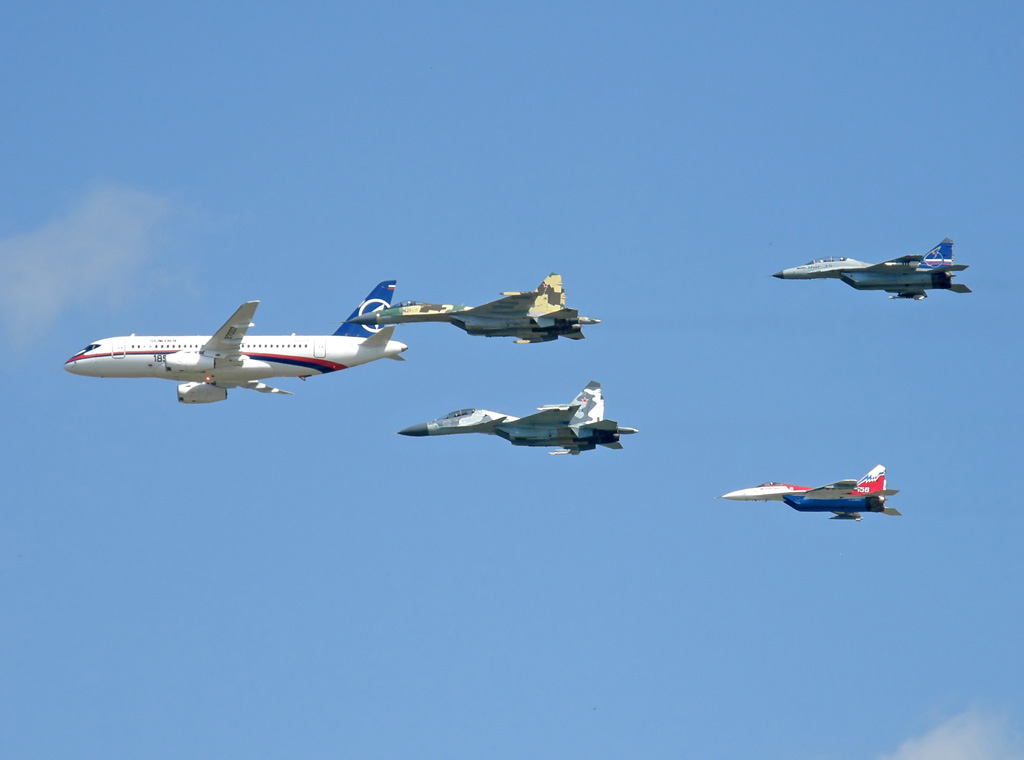
Many fighter jets and a majority of modern airliner designs are twinjets.

A twinjet or twin-engine jet is a jet aircraft powered by two engines. A twinjet is able to fly well enough to land with a single working engine, making it safer than a single-engine aircraft in the event of an engine failure. Fuel efficiency of a twinjet is better than that of aircraft with more engines. These considerations have led to the widespread use of aircraft of all types with twin engines, including airliners, fixed-wing military aircraft, and others.

== Aircraft configurations ==
There are three common configurations of twinjet aircraft. The first, common on large aircraft such as airliners, has a podded engine usually mounted beneath, or occasionally above or within, each wing. Most notable examples of such a configuration are the Boeing 737 and Airbus A320.

The second has one engine mounted on each side of the rear fuselage, close to its empennage, used by many business jets, although some airliners like the Fokker 70, Douglas DC-9 and COMAC ARJ21 utilise such a design as well.

In the third configuration both engines are within the fuselage, side-by-side, used by most fighters since the 1960s. Later fighters using this configuration include the Su-27 'Flanker', the F-15 Eagle, and the F-22 Raptor.

== History ==
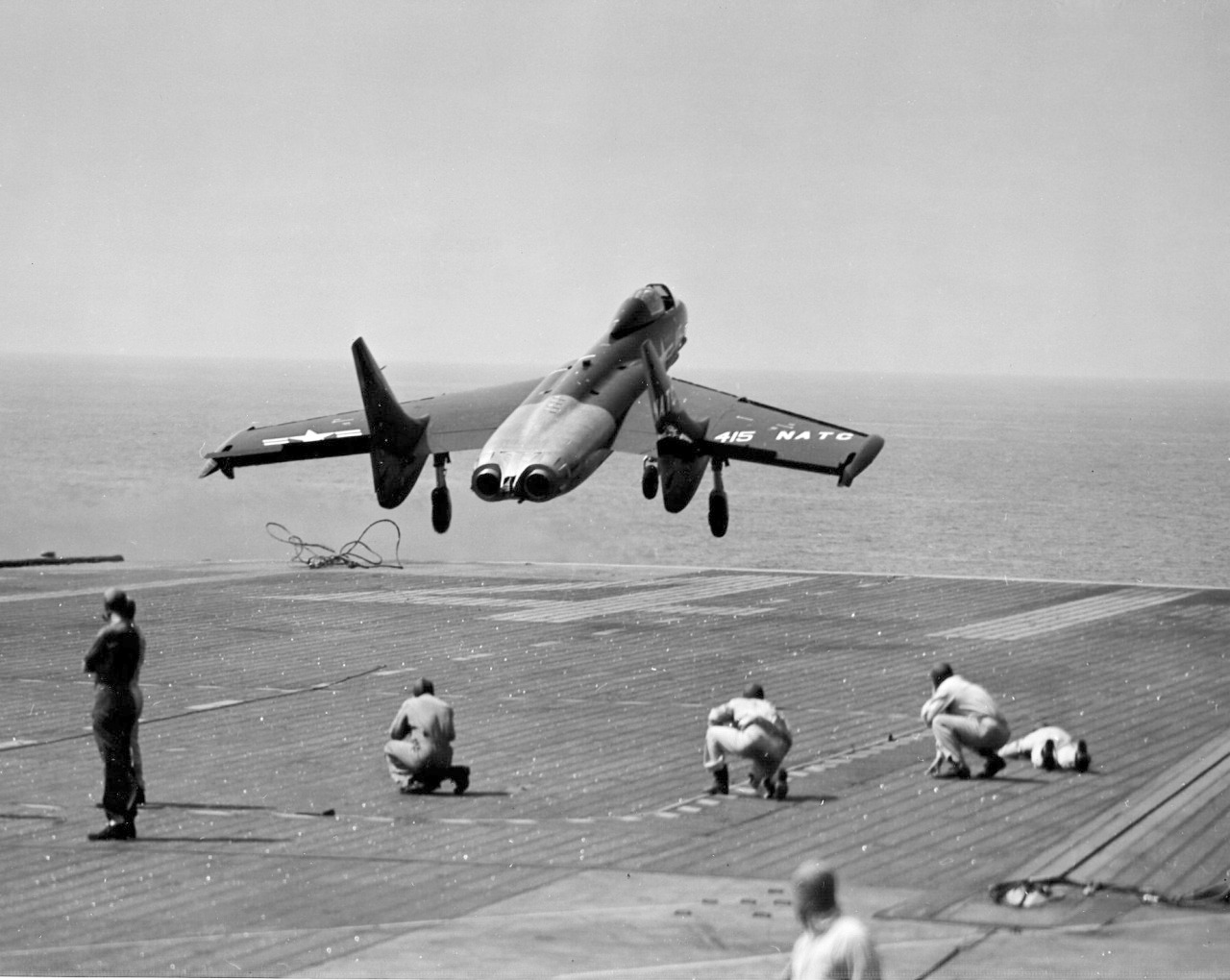
The Vought F7U Cutlass was one of the first modern twinjet fighters.

As jet aircraft emerged in the 1940s, many early airframes would be twinjets, as contemporary engines were not generally powerful and reliable enough to power airframes via a single engine. However, the first jet aircraft to fly, Germany’s Heinkel He 178, would be single engine-powered; its relatively small form, low weight, and its status as a prototype vice an operational aircraft meant that considerations for speed, reliability, and safety were secondary.

The first twinjet to fly was the German fighter-prototype, the Heinkel He 280, flying on 30 March 1941 with a pair of nacelle-mounted Heinkel HeS 8 turbojets. The first operational jet fighter aircraft, the German Messerschmitt Me 262, mounted two Junkers Jumo 004 engines.

On 15 May 1941 the first British jet, the Gloster E.28/39 made its first flight and was powered by a single engine. However, the first British jet to enter production was a twinjet, the Gloster Meteor.

The United States of America’s first jet was a twinjet; the Bell P-59 Airacomet would first fly on 1 October 1942. However, the first American production jet, the Lockheed P-80 Shooting Star, was a single-jet aircraft.

The twinjet configuration was used for short-range narrow-bodied aircraft such as the McDonnell Douglas DC-9 and Boeing 737. The Airbus A300 was initially not successful when first produced as a short-range widebody, as airlines operating the A300 on short-haul routes had to reduce frequencies to try to fill the high-capacity aircraft, and lost passengers to airlines operating more frequent narrow-body flights. However, after the introduction of ETOPS rules that allowed twin-engine jets to fly long-distance routes that were previously off-limits to them, Airbus was able to further develop the A300 as a medium- to long-range airliner to increased sales; Boeing launched its widebody twinjet, the Boeing 767, in response.

In the 1980s the Boeing 727 was discontinued, as its central engine bay would require a prohibitively expensive redesign to accommodate quieter high-bypass turbofans, and it was soon supplanted by twinjets for the narrow-body market; Airbus with the A320, and Boeing with the 757 and updated "classic" variants of the 737. During that decade only McDonnell Douglas continued development of the trijet design with an update to the DC-10, the MD-11, which initially had a range advantage over its closest medium wide-body competitors which were twinjets, the in-production Boeing 767 and Airbus A300/A310. In contrast to McDonnell Douglas sticking with their existing trijet configuration, Airbus (which never produced a trijet aircraft) and Boeing worked on new widebody twinjet designs that would become the Airbus A330 and Boeing 777, respectively. The MD-11's long range advantage was brief as it was soon nullified by the Airbus A330-300 and the extended-range Boeing 767-300ER and Boeing 777-200ER.

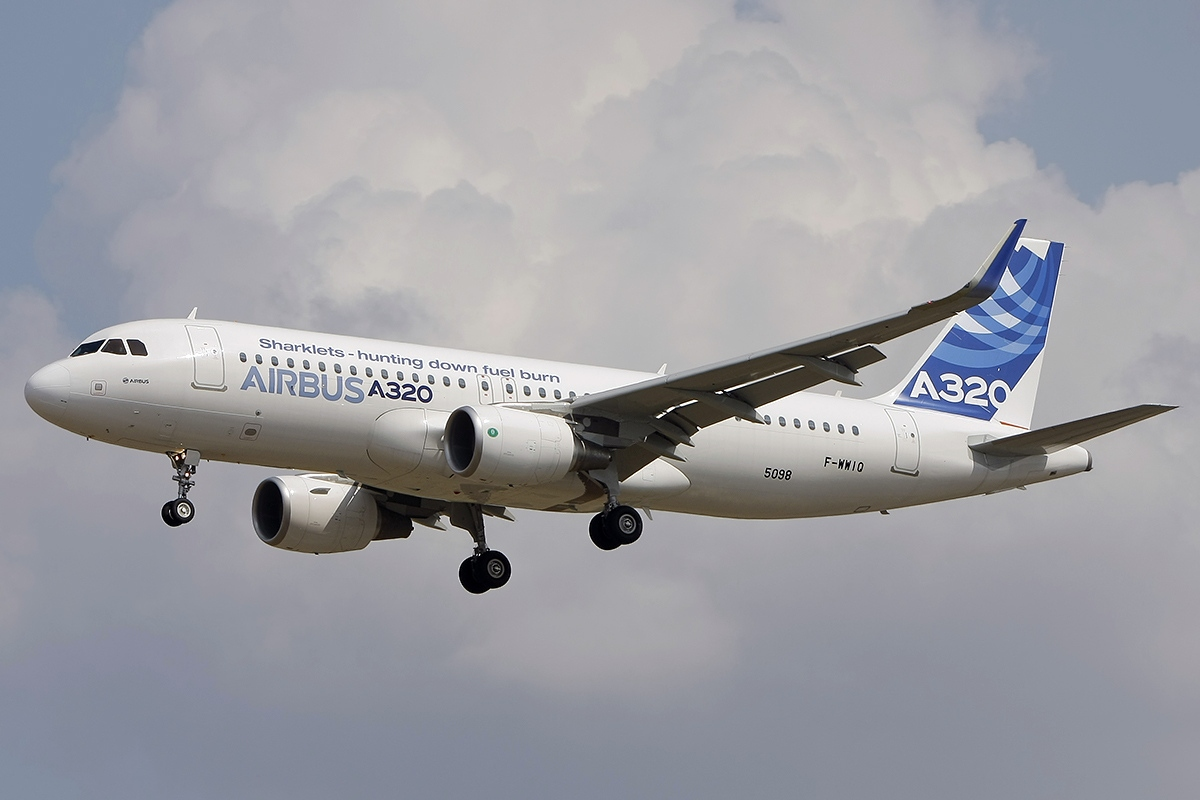
The Airbus A320 family is nowadays one of the most popular twinjet designs in service.

The Airbus A320 twinjet stands out as the most produced jet airliner. The Boeing 777X is the world's largest twinjet, and the 777-200LR variant has the world's second longest aircraft range (behind Airbus A350-900 ULR). Other Boeing twinjets include the 767, 757 (With the latter having stopped production, but still in commercial service) and 787. Competitor Airbus produces the A320 family, the A330, and the A350.

Some modern commercial airplanes still use four engines (quad-jets) like the Airbus A380 and Boeing 747-8, which are classified as very large aircraft (over 400 seats in mixed-class configurations). Four engines are still used on the largest cargo aircraft capable of transporting outsize cargo, including strategic airlifters.

== Efficiency ==
Twin-jets tend to be more fuel-efficient than trijet (three engine) and quad-jet (four engine) aircraft. As fuel efficiency in airliners is a high priority, many airlines have been increasingly retiring trijet and quad-jet designs in favor of twinjets in the twenty-first century. The trijet designs were phased out first, in particular due to the more complicated design and maintenance issues of the middle engine mounted on the stabilizer. Early twinjets were not permitted by ETOPS restrictions to fly long-haul trans-oceanic routes, as it was thought that they were unsafe in the event of failure of one engine, so quad-jets were used. Quad-jets also had higher carrying capacity than comparable earlier twinjets. However, later twinjets such as the Boeing 777, Boeing 787 and Airbus A350 have matched or surpassed older quad-jet designs such as the Boeing 747 and Airbus A340 in these aspects, and twinjets have been more successful in terms of sales than quad-jets.

In 2012, Airbus studied a 470-seat twinjet competitor for the Boeing 747-8 with lower operating costs expected between 2023 and 2030, revived after Boeing launched the 777X in November 2013, while then-CEO Fabrice Brégier preferred to focus on product improvement rather than all-new concepts for 10 years. It would have a 10-abreast economy like the 777; its 565 m^{2} (6,081 sq ft) wing, slightly more than the 747-8, would have an 80 m (262 ft) span, as wide as the A380, for a 892,900 lb (405 t) MTOW compared to 775,000 lb (352 t) for the 777X, with a composite structure for an operating empty weight of 467,400 lb (212 t), and a 8,150 nmi (15,090 km) range at Mach 0.85.

== ETOPS ==
When flying far from diversionary airports (so called ETOPS/LROPS flights), the aircraft must be able to reach an alternate on the remaining engine within a specified time in case of one engine failure. When aircraft are certified according to ETOPS standards, thrust is not an issue, as one of the engines is more than powerful enough to keep the aircraft aloft (see below). Mostly, ETOPS certification involves maintenance and design requirements ensuring that a failure of one engine cannot make the other one fail also. The engines and related systems need to be independent and (in essence) independently maintained. ETOPS/LROPS is often incorrectly thought to apply only to long overwater flights, but it applies to any flight more than a specified distance from an available diversion airport. Overwater flights near diversion airports need not be ETOPS/LROPS-compliant.

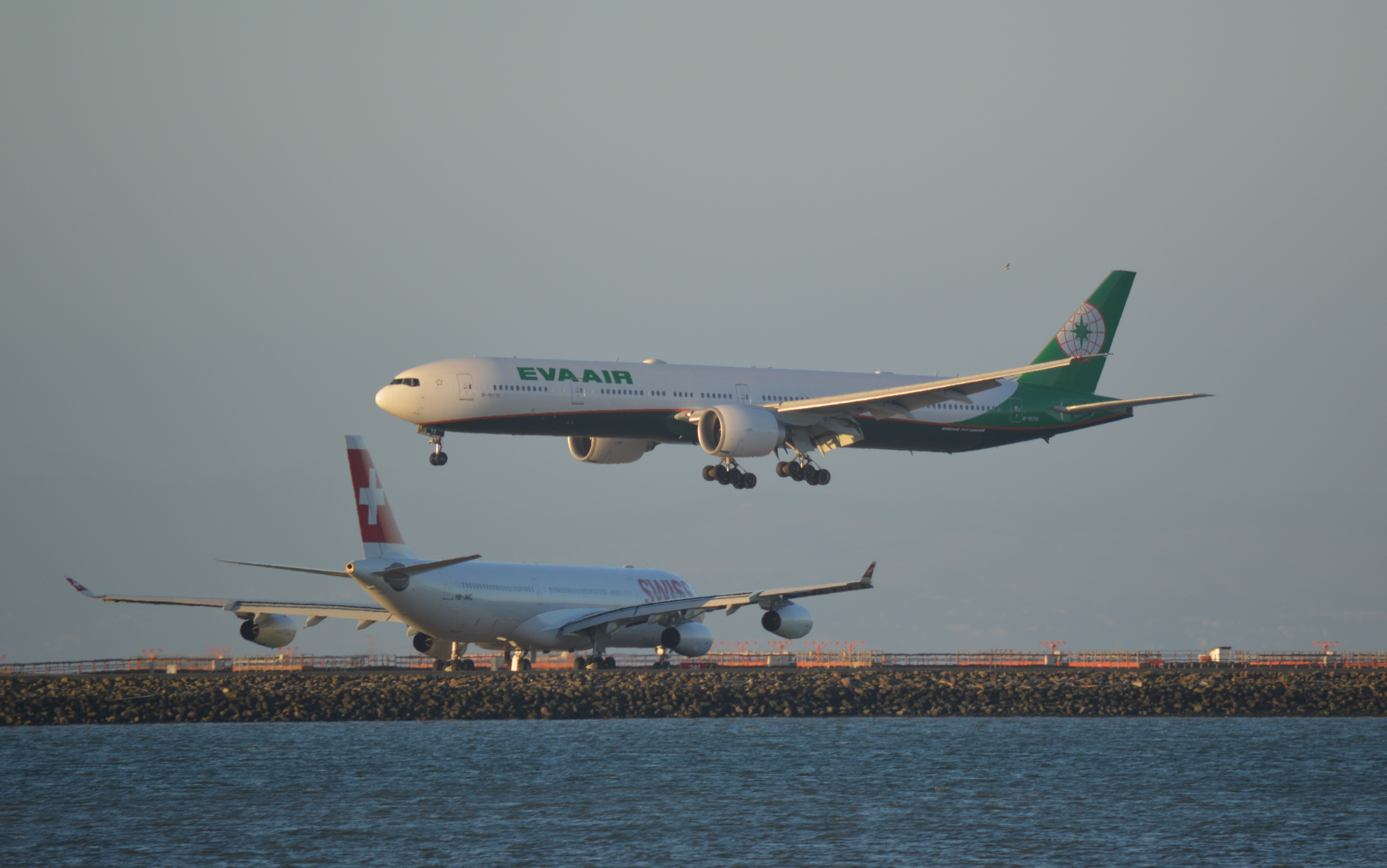
More-efficient modern twinjets like the Boeing 777 have replaced legacy quadjet designs like the Airbus A340 and Boeing 747 on major long-haul, transocean routes.

=== Introduction to transoceanic flights ===
Since the 1990s, airlines have increasingly turned from four-engine or three-engine airliners to twin-engine airliners to operate transatlantic and transpacific flight routes. On a nonstop flight from America to Asia or Europe, the long-range aircraft usually follows a great circle route. Hence, in case of an engine failure in a twinjet (like Boeing 777), the twin-jet could make emergency landings in fields in Canada, Alaska, eastern Russia, Greenland, Iceland, or the British Isles. The Boeing 777 has also been approved by the Federal Aviation Administration for flights between North America and Hawaii, which is the world's longest regular airline route with no diversion airports along the way.

== Other advantages ==
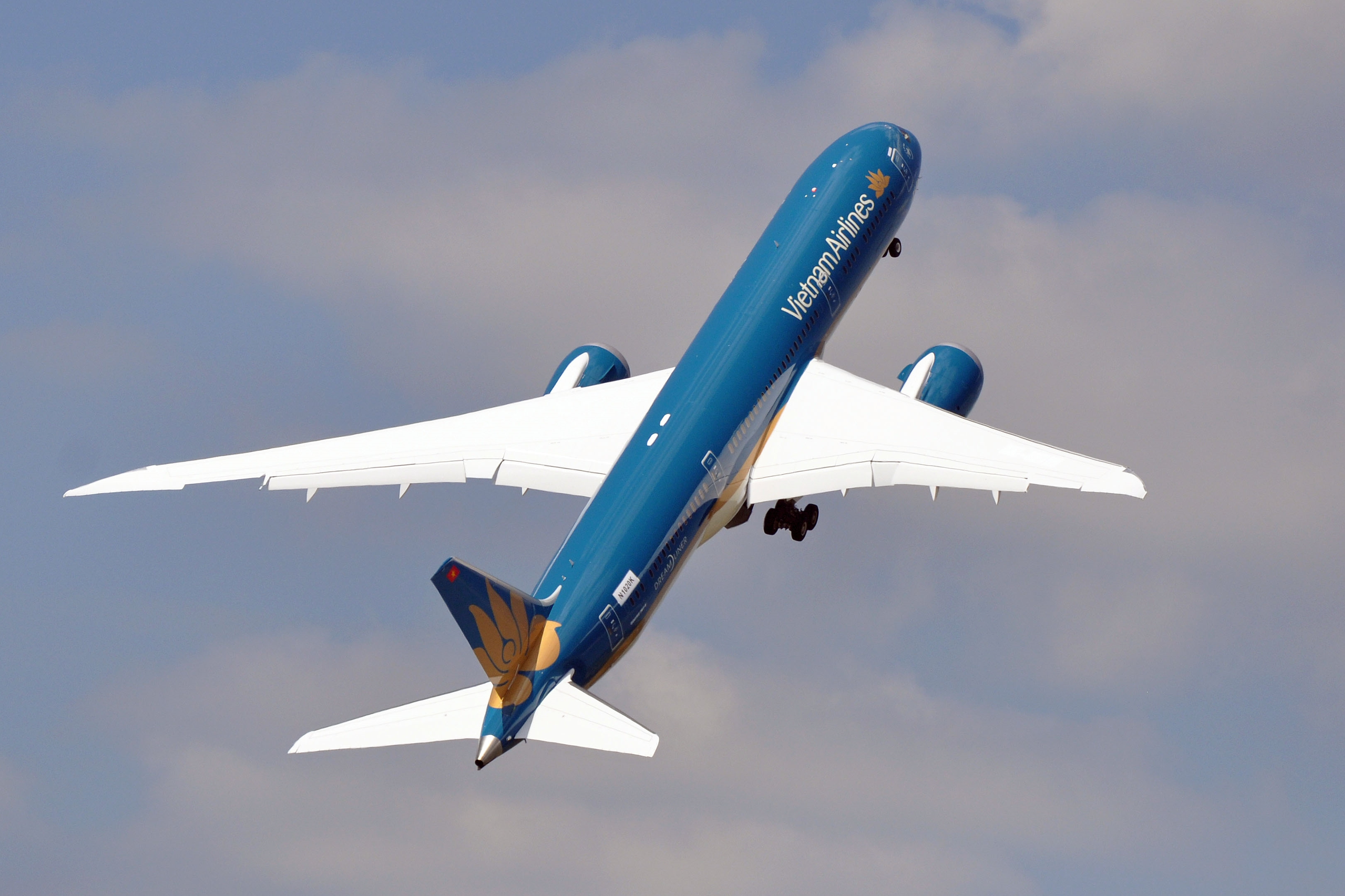
A Boeing 787-9 performing a steep climbing take-off amid an airshow as demonstration of capabilities.

On large passenger jets, the cost of the engines makes up a significant proportion of the plane's final cost. Each engine also requires separate service, paperwork, and certificates. Having two larger engines as opposed to three or four smaller engines will typically significantly reduce both the purchase and maintenance costs of a plane.

Regulations governing the required thrust levels for transport aircraft are typically based upon the requirement that an aircraft be able to continue a takeoff if an engine fails after the takeoff decision speed is reached. Thus, with all engines operating, trijets must be able to produce at least 150% of the minimum thrust required to climb and quad-jets 133%. Conversely, since a twinjet will lose half of its total thrust if an engine fails, they are required to produce 200% of the minimum thrust required to climb when both engines are operating. Because of this, twinjets typically have higher thrust-to-weight ratios than aircraft with more engines, and are thus able to accelerate and climb faster.

== See also ==
- Wide-body aircraft
