= Trijet =

Aircraft propelled by three jet engines

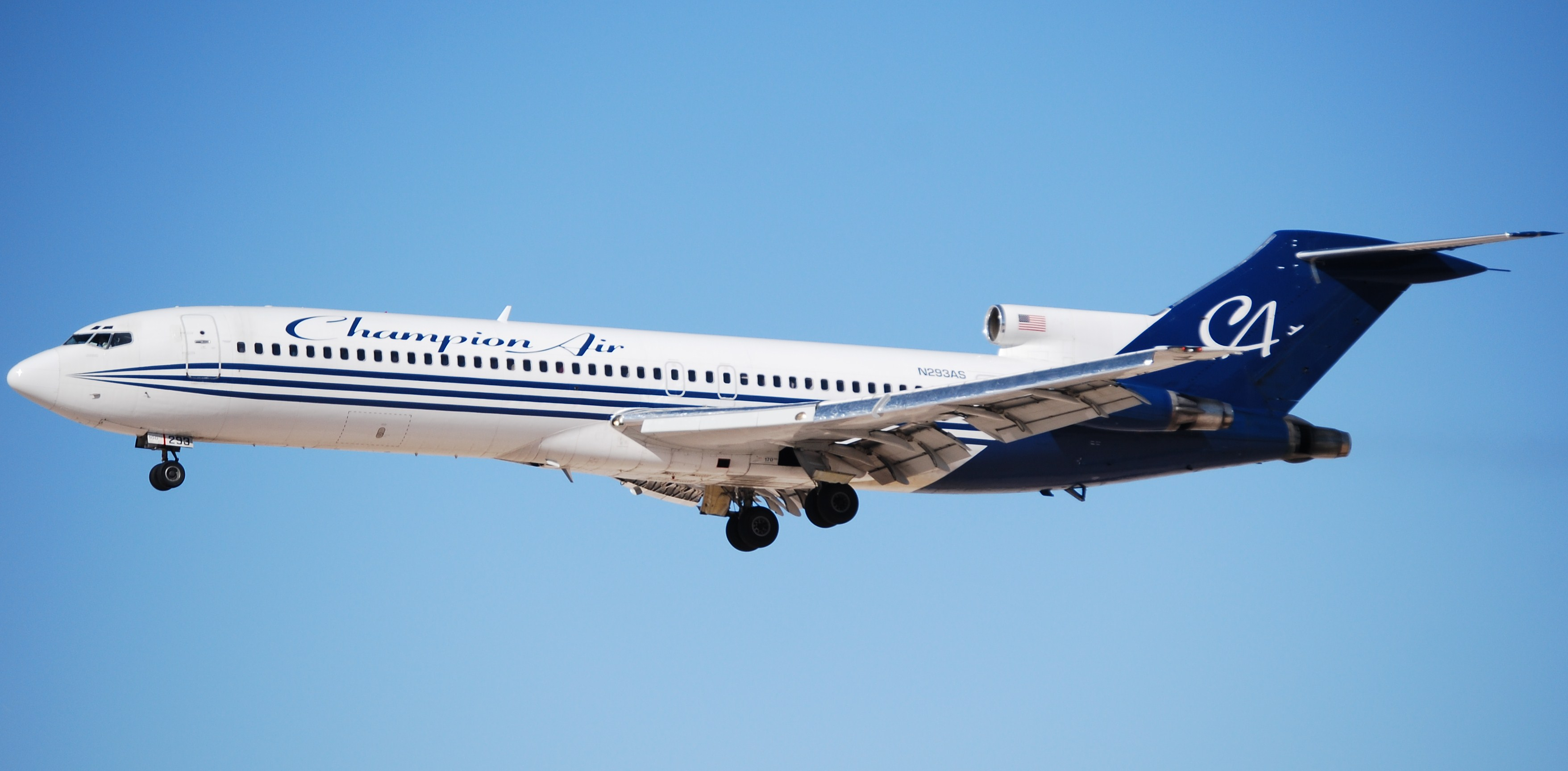
One of the first trijets: Boeing 727 with all 3 engines at the T-tail

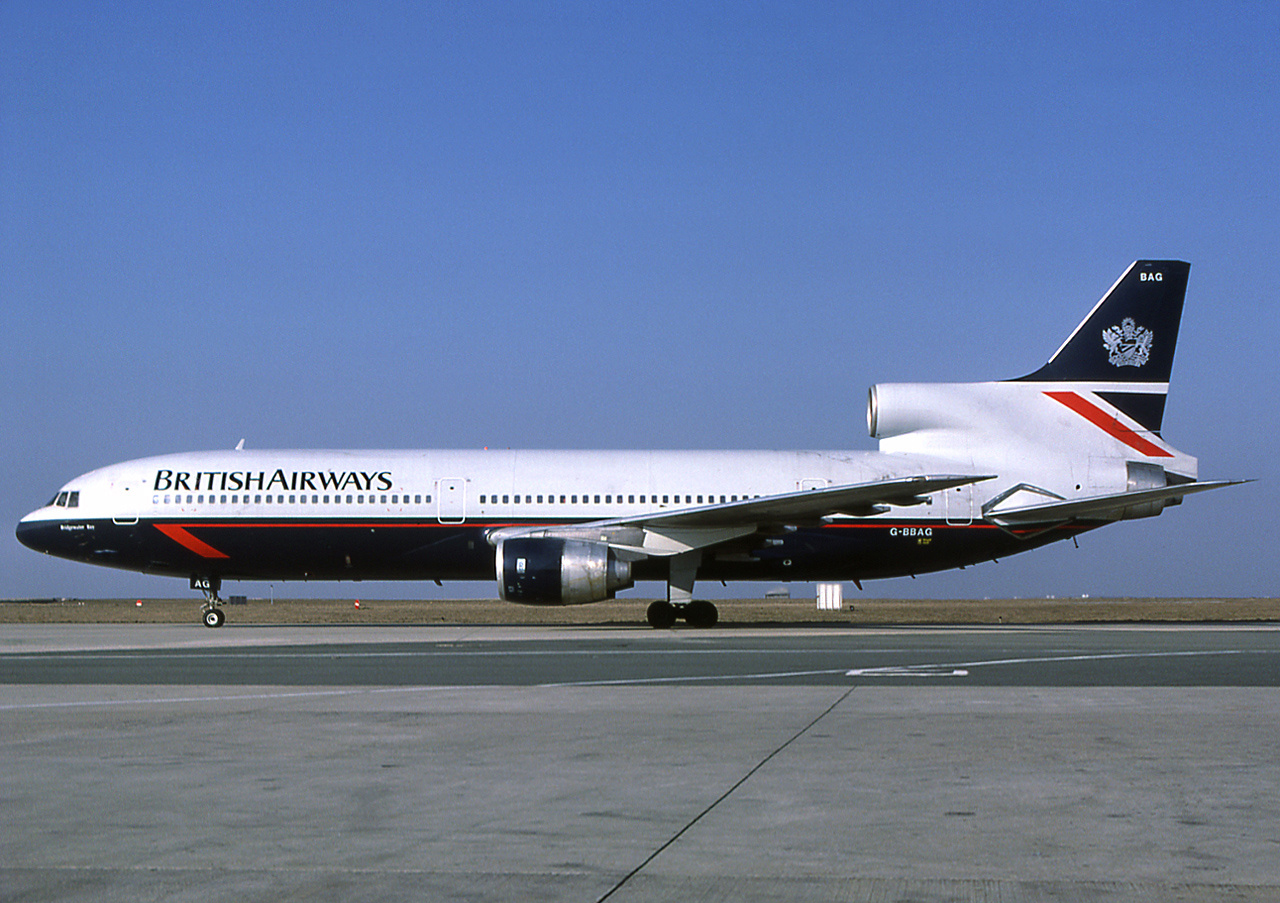
Lockheed L-1011 TriStar had only one tail engine, also with S-duct

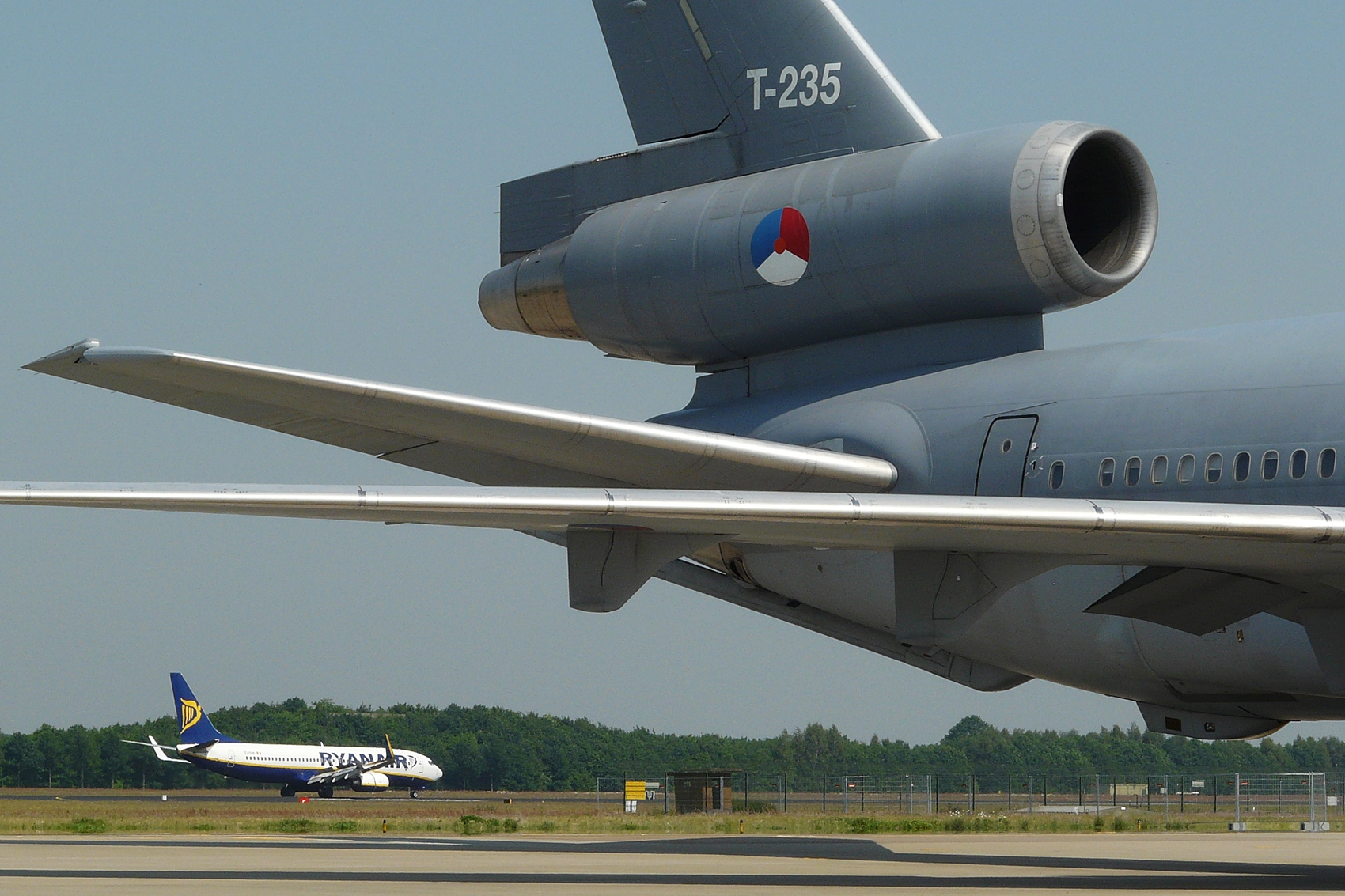
"Straight-through" central engine layout on the DC-10-based KC-10

A trijet is a jet aircraft powered by three jet engines. In general, passenger airline trijets are considered to be second-generation jet airliners, due to their innovative engine locations, in addition to the advancement of turbofan technology. Trijets are more efficient than quadjets, but not as efficient as twinjets, which replaced trijets as larger and more reliable turbofan engines became available.

== Types still in production ==
- Chengdu J-36
- Dassault Falcon 8X
- Dassault Falcon 900

== Design ==
One consideration with trijets is positioning the central engine. This is usually accomplished by placing the engine along the centerline but still poses difficulties. The most common configuration is having the central engine located in the rear fuselage and supplied with air by an S-shaped duct; this is used on the Hawker Siddeley Trident, Boeing 727, Tupolev Tu-154, Lockheed L-1011 TriStar, and, more recently, the Dassault Falcon 7X. The S-duct has low drag, and since the third engine is mounted closer to the centerline, the aircraft will normally be easy to handle in the event of an engine failure. However, S-duct designs are more complex and costlier, particularly for an airliner. Furthermore, the central engine bay would require structural changes in the event of a major re-engining (remodeling of the engine). For example, the 727's central bay was only wide enough to fit a low-bypass turbofan and not the newer high-bypass turbofans which were quieter and more powerful. Boeing decided that a redesign was too expensive and ended its production instead of pursuing further development. The Lockheed Tristar's tail section was too short to fit an existing two-spool engine as it was designed only to accommodate the new three-spool Rolls-Royce RB211 engine, and delays in the RB211's development, in turn, pushed back the TriStar's entry into service which affected sales.

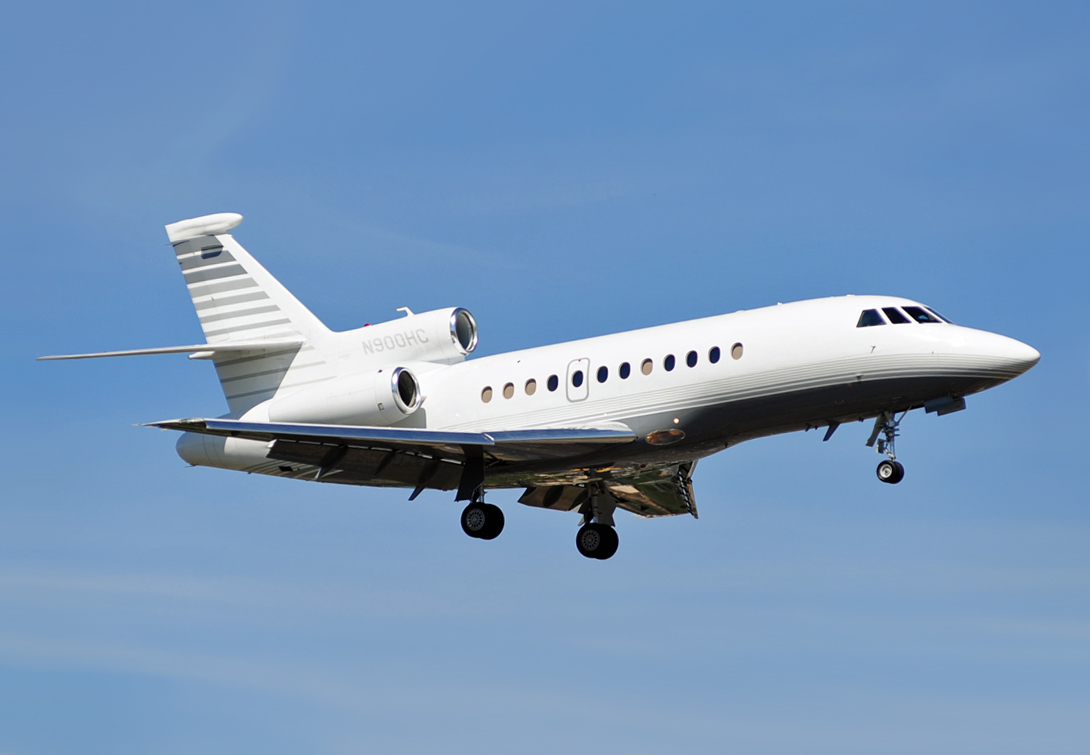
Dassault Falcon 900EX. The 900 and its derivatives, the Falcon 8x, are the only trijets in production.

The McDonnell Douglas DC-10 and related MD-11 use an alternative "straight-through" central engine layout, which allows for easier installation, modification, and access. It also has the additional benefit of being much easier to re-engine. However, this sacrifices aerodynamics compared to the S-duct. Also, as the engine is located much higher up than the wing-mounted engines, engine failure will produce a greater pitching moment, making it more difficult to control.

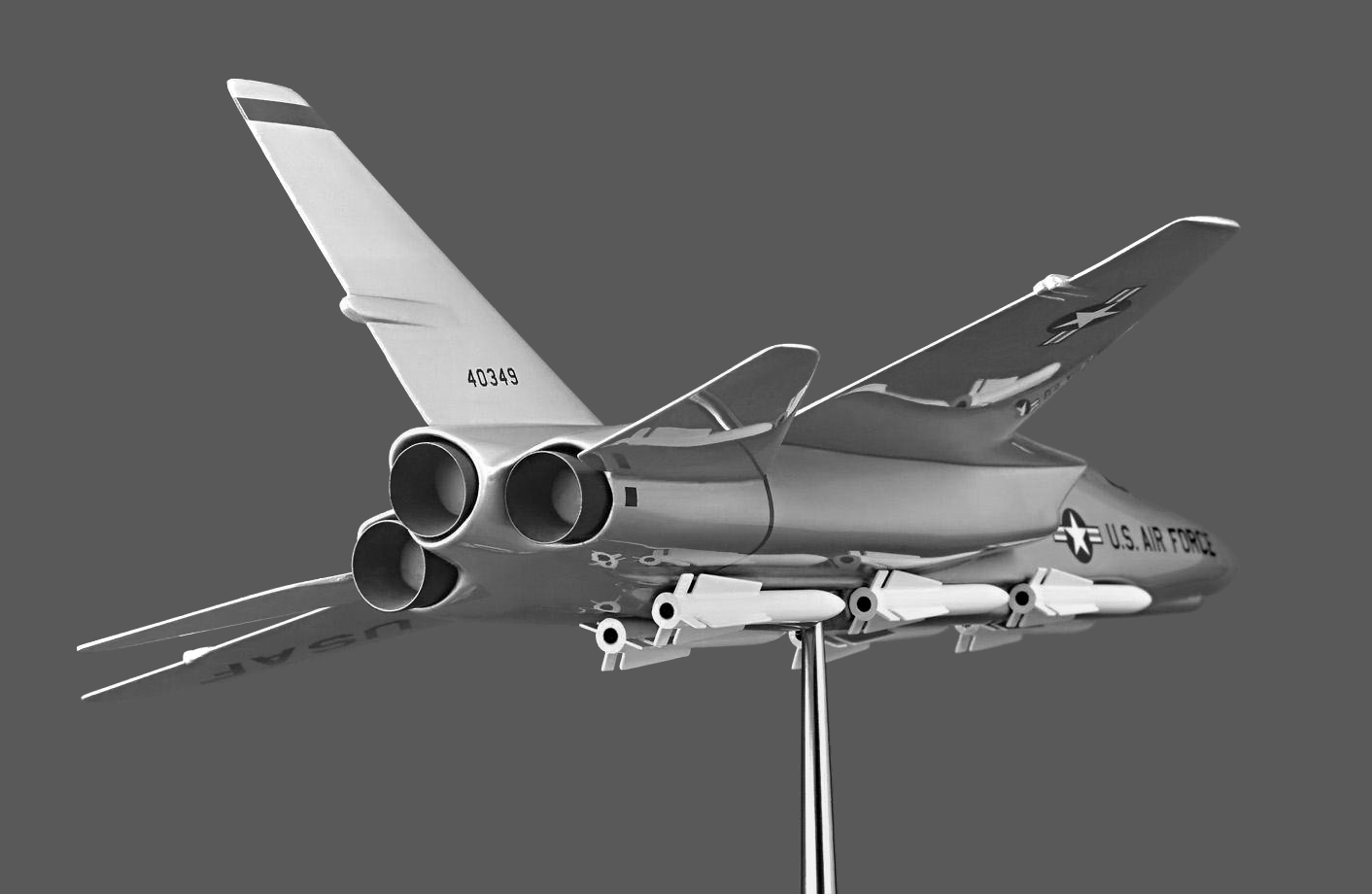
Manufacturer's model of the NR-349 improved crewed interceptor proposal

The placement of the remaining two engines varies. Most smaller aircraft, such as the Hawker Siddeley Trident and the Boeing 727, as well as the intermediate-sized Tupolev Tu-154, have two side-mount engine pylons in a T-tail configuration. The larger widebody Lockheed TriStar and DC-10/MD-11 mount an engine underneath each wing. Preliminary studies were done on the TriStar to reuse the fuselage and wing for a twinjet design, though these never materialized due to Lockheed's lack of funds. Additionally, in the late 1990s, Boeing, which had taken over McDonnell Douglas, considered removing the tail engine from the MD-11 to make it a twinjet but instead cancelled MD-11 production altogether.

== Advantages and drawbacks ==
Trijets are more efficient and cheaper than four-engine aircraft, as the engines are the most expensive part of the plane, and having more engines consumes more fuel, particularly if quadjets and trijets share engines of similar power. For widebody aircraft, this advantage makes the trijet configuration more suited to a mid-size airliner compared to the quadjet layout for jumbo jets (i.e., the DC-10 versus the quadjet Boeing 747). However, the difficulty and complexity of mounting the third engine through the tail will somewhat negate the cost/efficiency advantage. Nonetheless, this was worth the trade-off in the 1960s to the 1990s when widebody trijets and twinjets shared engines of similar output, such as when the DC-10, MD-11, Boeing's 767, and Airbus's A300, A310, and A330 were all powered by the General Electric CF6, and the additional power from the third engine gave the DC-10/MD-11 advantages in longer range and/or heavier payload over the A300/A310/A330 twinjet. Since the 1990s, with further advancements in high-bypass turbofan technology, large twinjets have been equipped with purpose-designed engines such as the Boeing 777's General Electric GE90, allowing twinjets to perform the same tasks as most trijets and even many quadjets but more efficiently.

Due to their added thrust, trijets will have slightly improved takeoff performance compared to twinjets if an engine fails. Because takeoff performance for aircraft is usually calculated to include an extra margin to account for a possible engine failure, trijets are better able to take off from hot and high airports or those where terrain clearance near the runway is an issue.

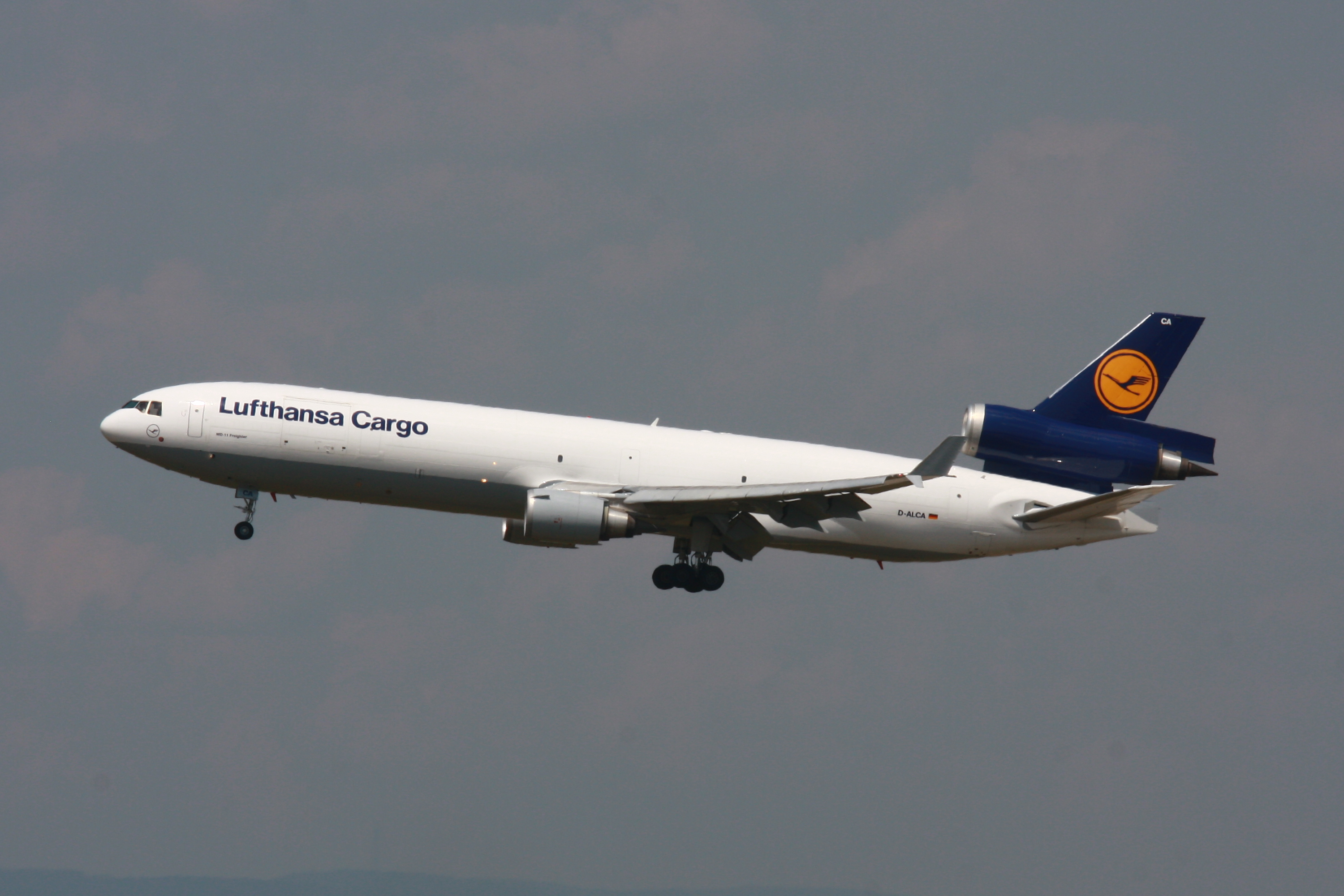
The McDonnell Douglas MD-11 is the largest and most recent airliner-size trijet produced.

Unlike twinjets, trijets are not required to land immediately at the nearest suitable airport if one engine fails. (This advantage is also shared with quadjets.) This is advantageous if the aircraft is not near one of the operator's maintenance bases, as the pilots may then continue the flight and land at an airport where it is more suitable to perform repairs. Additionally, for trijets on the ground with one engine inoperative, approval can be granted to perform two-engine ferry flights. Prior to the introduction of ETOPS, only trijets and quadjets were able to perform long international flights over areas without any diversion airports. However, this advantage has largely disappeared recently as ETOPS-certified twin-engined aircraft are able to do so as well.

Another major advantage of the trijet design is that the wings can be located further aft on the fuselage, compared to twinjets and quadjets with all wing-mounted engines, allowing main cabin exit and entry doors to be more centrally located for quicker boarding and deplaning, ensuring shorter turnaround times.

However, a disadvantage is that the rear-mounted engines shift the aircraft's center of gravity rearwards. This forces the wings to be aft-mounted and reduces the moment arm between the horizontal stabilizer and the center of gravity. Consequently, abnormally large stabilizers are required to maintain longitudinal stability, seen on the McDonnell Douglas DC-10 and Lockheed L-1011, resulting in reduced fuel efficiency. The successor of the DC-10, the MD-11, attempted to mitigate this by reducing the size of the horizontal stabilizer, causing the aircraft to be slightly less stable and more complex to handle during takeoff and landing.

== History ==
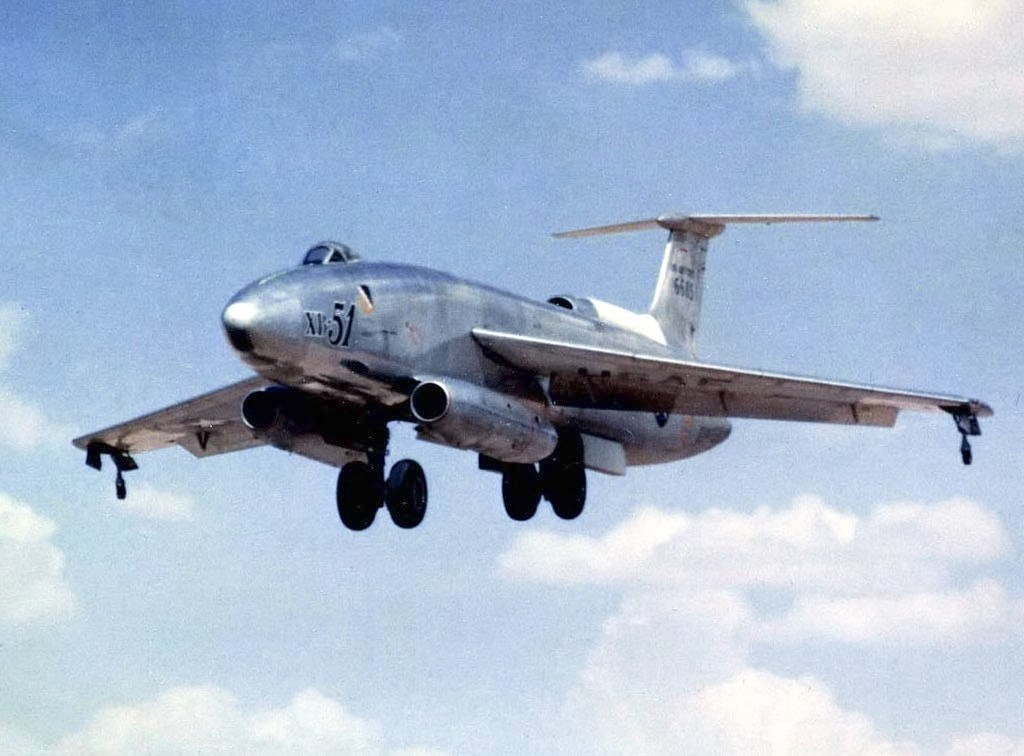
The Martin XB-51 was one of the first trijet designs.

The first trijet design to fly was the Tupolev Tu-73 bomber prototype, first flown in 1947. The first commercial trijets were the Hawker Siddeley Trident (1962) and the Boeing 727 (1963). Both were compromises to meet airline requirements; in the case of the Trident, it was to meet BEA's changing needs, while the 727 had to be acceptable for three different airlines. Although collaboration between the manufacturers was considered, it did not come about.

Early American twinjet designs were limited by the FAA's 60-minute rule, whereby the flight path of twin-engine jetliners was restricted to within 60 minutes' flying time from a suitable airport in case of engine failure. In 1964, this rule was lifted for trijet designs, as they had a greater safety margin.

For second-generation jet airliners, with the innovations of the high-bypass turbofan for greater efficiency and reduced noise and the wide-body (twin-aisle) for greater passenger/cargo capacity, the trijet design was considered the optimal configuration for the medium wide-body jet airliner, sitting in terms of size, range, and cost between quads (four-engine aircraft) and twinjets, and this development led to a flurry of trijet designs. The four-engine Boeing 747 was popular for transoceanic flights due to its long range and large size, but it was expensive, and not all routes were able to fill its seating capacity, while the original models of the Airbus A300 twinjet were limited to short- to medium-range distances. During this period, different jet airliners shared engines of similar output, such as when the McDonnell Douglas DC-10, Airbus A300, and Boeing 767 were powered by the General Electric CF6, the additional power from the third engine gave the DC-10 advantages in longer range and/or heavier payload over the A300 and 767 twinjets. Thus, trijet designs such as the DC-10 and L-1011 TriStar represented the best compromise with medium- to long-range and medium size that US airlines sought for their domestic and transatlantic routes. As a result of these trijet wide-bodies, as well as the popularity of the Boeing 727, in their heyday of the 1980s, trijets made up a majority of all such US jet airliners.

From 1985 to 2003, the number of such planes in service had sunk from 1488 to 602. The number of twinjets, on the other hand, had more than quadrupled in the same period. Both Lockheed and McDonnell Douglas were financially weakened competing in the widebody market, which led to Lockheed ending production of the L-1011 in 1984 after producing only half the units needed to break even, while a number of fatal DC-10 crashes also slowed its sales. In 1984 Boeing ended production of the 727, as its central engine bay would require an extremely expensive redesign to accommodate quieter high-bypass turbofans, and it was soon supplanted by Airbus with their A320 and Boeing with their 737 and 757. Further advancements in high-bypass turbofan technology and subsequent relaxation in airline safety rules made the trijet and even the quadjet nearly obsolete for passenger services, as their range and payload could be covered more efficiently with large twinjets powered with purpose-designed engines such as the 777's General Electric GE90.

During the 1980s, McDonnell Douglas was the only Western manufacturer to continue development of the trijet design with an update to the DC-10, the MD-11. It became the largest trijet in the world and initially held a range and payload advantage over its closest medium-wide-body competitors, which were twinjets, the in-production Boeing 767 and the upcoming Airbus A330. McDonnell Douglas had planned a new trijet called the MD-XX, which was a lengthened version of the MD-11. The MD-XX Long Range aircraft would have been capable of traveling distances up to 8,320 nautical miles (15,410 km) and had a wingspan of 65 m (213 feet). The project was canceled in 1996, one year before McDonnell Douglas was acquired by Boeing. Boeing ended production of the MD-11 after filling remaining customer orders, since the MD-11 would have competed with the 767 and 777. A study to remove the MD-11's tail-mounted engine (which would have made it a twinjet) never came to fruition, as it would have been very expensive, and the MD-11 had very little in common in terms of design or type rating with other Boeing airliners. In contrast to McDonnell Douglas sticking with their existing trijet configuration, Airbus (which never produced a trijet aircraft) and Boeing worked on new widebody twinjet designs that would become the A330 and 777, respectively. The MD-11's long-range advantage was brief, as it soon was threatened by the A330's four-engine derivative, the A340, and the 777. The only other notable trijet development during the 1980s was in the Soviet Union, where the Tupolev Tu-154 was re-engined with the Soloviev D-30 engine as well as a new wing design and entered serial production from 1984 as the Tu-154M.

With the exceptions of the Dassault Falcon 7X, Falcon 8x, and Falcon 900 business jets, no manufacturer currently produces three-engine airliners.

=== Current status ===
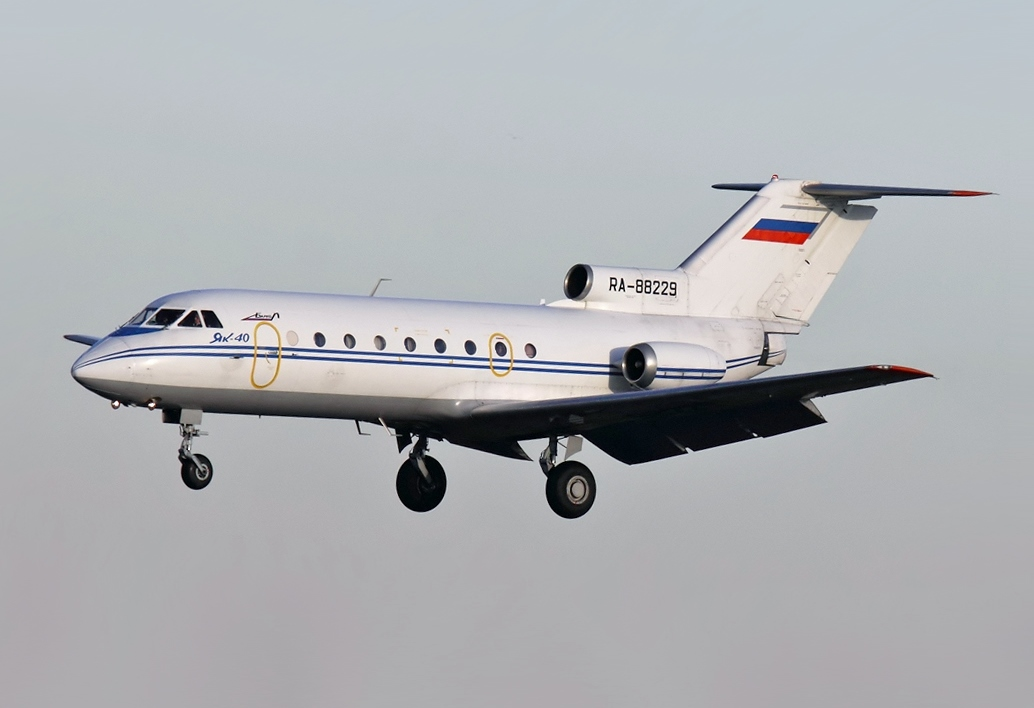
A Yakovlev Yak-40 on final approach

Modern engines have extremely low failure rates and can generate much higher shaft power and thrust than early types. This makes twinjets more suitable than they were before for long-haul trans-oceanic operations, resulting in eased ETOPS restrictions; modern wide-body twin-engine jets usually have an ETOPS 180 or (in the case of the Boeing 777 and 787) ETOPS 330 rating, and even ETOPS 370 for the Airbus A350. As such, having more than two engines is no longer considered necessary, except for very large or heavy aircraft such as the Boeing 747, Airbus A380 (over 400 seats in a mixed-class configuration), Antonov An-124, and An-225, or for flights through the Southern Hemisphere, primarily to and from Australia (which has not yet adopted the ETOPS 330 standard), where the most direct route for some flights is over Antarctica.

Since 2000, both narrow-body and wide-body trijet production has ceased for almost all commercial aircraft, being replaced by twinjets. As of 2016, the Falcon 7X, 8X, and 900 business jets, all of which use S-ducts, are the only trijets in production. Trijets that are no longer in production, such as the 727, Tu-154, DC-10, and MD-11, have found second careers as cargo aircraft, as well as in limited charter, governmental, and military service. However, because of the average age of trijets and the COVID-19 pandemic, most non-private operators have chosen to retire quadjets and trijets and replace them with more efficient and cost-saving twinjets. Today, the only widely used trijet is the MD-11, mostly operated by FedEx Express in cargo service.

For smaller private and corporate operators, where maximum fuel efficiency is often less important than for scheduled-route operating airlines, trijets may still be of interest due to their immunity from ETOPS limits and the ability to take off from shorter runways and therefore have access to more airports. As a result, a sizeable number of trijets, such as the newly built Dassault Falcons, are in use by private operators and corporate flight departments.

=== Future of trijets ===
Airbus filed a patent in 2008 for a new, twin-tail trijet design, whose tail engine appears to use a "straight" layout similar to the MD-11, but it is unknown if and when this will be developed or produced. However, the proposed Boeing X-48 blended wing body design, Lockheed's N+2 design study, and Aerion AS2 supersonic business jet were also supposed to have three engines. The AS2 programme was cancelled in May 2021 when Aerion shut down.

Boom Technology's planned Overture supersonic transport (SST) airliner was originally planned to use three engines, with the third engine installed in the tail with a Y-shaped duct and air intakes on both sides of the rear. However, a revised design with four engines located under a delta wing was unveiled at the Farnborough Airshow on July 19, 2022.

On 26 December 2024, a trijet aircraft believed to be a Chengdu J-36 was spotted reportedly conducting test flights in Chengdu, Sichuan, China. Since the aircraft's serial number (36011) begins with '36,' following the People's Liberation Army Air Force convention, this model was presumably designated as J-36, but further information is limited.

== See also ==
- List of trijet aircraft
- S-duct
- Twinjet
- Trimotor
- Quadjet
