= List of trijet aircraft =

The following is a list of trijet aircraft.

Cancelled before production of prototype
Currently in production

Aircraft		Development		Production			Operation	
Aircraft		Start	Cancelled	Start	End	Number built	Introduced	Retired
Aerion AS2		2014	2021			0		
Avro Canada VZ-9 Avrocar	tumb	1953	1961	1958	1961	2	1958	1961
Boeing 727	tumb	1957		1962	1984	1,832	1963	
Boeing X-48	tumb	2000		2005	2005	2	2007	
Boom XB-1	tumb	2016		2024		1		
Bristol Type 200	tumb	1956	1958			0		
Chengdu J-36		2025				1?		
Convair Model 200	tumb	1973	1973			0		
Convair XB-53	tumb	1945	1949			0		
Dassault Falcon 50	tumb	1974		1976	2008	352	1976	
Dassault Falcon 7X	tumb	2001		2005		289	2007	
Dassault Falcon 8X	tumb	2014		2016		116+	2016	
Dassault Falcon 900	tumb	1984		1984		500+	1986	
DC-10 Air Tanker	tumb	2002		2006	2014	5	2006	
Hawker Siddeley Trident	tumb	1957		1962	1978	117	1964	1995
Lockheed L-1011 TriStar	tumb	1967		1968	1984	250	1972	
Lockheed TriStar (RAF)	tumb	1982		1982	1986	9	1986	2014
Martin XB-51	tumb	1945	1952	1949	1950	2	1949	1956
McDonnell Douglas DC-10	tumb	1965		1969	1989	386	1971	
McDonnell Douglas KC-10 Extender	tumb	1975		1979	1987	63	1981	
McDonnell Douglas MD-11	tumb	1986		1988	2000	200	1990	
NR-349	tumb	1970-72	19??			0		
SNCASO Trident	tumb	1948	1958	1953	1958	8	1953	1958
Sukhoi-Gulfstream S-21	tumb	1987				0		
Tupolev '73'	tumb	1946	1949	1947	1947	1	1947	1949
Tupolev Tu-154	tumb	1965		1968	2013	1,026	1968	
Tupolev Tu-155	tumb	1988		1988	1988	1	1988	1991
Yakovlev Yak-141	tumb	1975	1991	1985	1986	4	1987	1992
Yakovlev Yak-38	tumb	1968		1975	1981	231	1975	1991
Yakovlev Yak-40	tumb	1965		1967	1981	1,011	1968	
Yakovlev Yak-42	tumb	1972		1977	2003	187	1980	

== Proposed or suspended trijet developments ==
- Boeing 747-300 Trijet – downsized 747 to compete with the DC-10 and L-1011, changed to four engines
- Blended Wing Body Trijet – proposed design based on the Boeing X-48
- McDonnell Douglas MD-XX – stretched derivative of the DC-10, project shelved
- North American NR-349 – proposed interceptor derivative of the A-5 Vigilante, cancelled
- Airbus twin-tail trijet, – status unknown
- Dassault Supersonic Business Jet – suspended
- Aerion AS2 - Suspended
- Sukhoi-Gulfstream S-21
- Boom Technology Overture - 3-engine design proposed, but changed to 4-engine
- Boeing 777 – Originally envisioned as a trijet 767 in the 1970s to compete with the DC-10 and the L-1011; later became a new twin-engine design.

== See also ==
- Trijet
