= Tupolev Tu-454 =

Russian future widebody airliner

General information
- Type: Wide-body jet airliner
- National origin: Russia
- Manufacturer: Tupolev
- Designer: Tupolev's Design Bureau
- Status: Concept aircraft

History
- Developed from: Tupolev Tu-234

The Tupolev Tu-454 is a future twin-engine airliner concept displayed by Tupolev at the 20th Russian Venture Forum. The aircraft will be powered by two Aviadvigatel PD-26 engines.

== History ==
The Tu-454 was announced to be a wide-body airliner concept developed by Tupolev under the umbrella of the United Aircraft Corporation, and first publicly revealed as a scale model at the Russian Venture Forum on 12 April 2026. The project began in 2026 as part of Russia's effort to re-establish an indigenous long-haul wide-body capability following the collapse of the CRAIC CR929 program and reduced access to Western-built aircraft. The Tu-454 is envisioned as a twin-engine, long-range airliner in the class of the Boeing 787 Dreamliner and Airbus A350, with projected capacity of 250–350 passengers and a range of approximately 15,000 km.

== Design ==
The design incorporates a modern, composite-intensive airframe and is expected to be powered by two next-generation PD-26 turbofan engines developed by Aviadvigatel, to replace foreign-supplied propulsion systems with domestically produced alternatives. As of April 2026, the Tu-454 remains at an early conceptual or mock-up stage, with no officially announced development timeline, production plans, or confirmed customers. Future prospects for the aircraft are closely tied to Russia’s long-term aviation strategy, including achieving technological self-sufficiency, overcoming supply chain constraints, and determining whether the program will be formally launched as a flagship wide-body airliner in the 2030s.
