= ACAC consortium =

Former Chinese aviation consortium

The AVIC I Commercial Aircraft Company (ACAC consortium; Chinese: 中航商用飞机有限公司) was a subsidiary of China Aviation Industry Corporation I (AVIC I), formed in 2002 by various Chinese aviation companies, including:

- Shanghai Aircraft Design and Research Institute
- 602nd Aircraft Design Institute
- Chengdu Aircraft Industry Group
- Shanghai Aircraft Manufacturing Factory
- Shenyang Aircraft Corporation
- Xi'an Aircraft Industrial Corporation

In 2009 it became part of the Commercial Aircraft Corporation of China.

== Products ==
- The joint venture has developed the ARJ21 regional jet.
