= Comac C949 =

Chinese supersonic passenger aircraft

General information
- Type: Supersonic airliner
- National origin: China
- Manufacturer: Comac
- Status: In preliminary design

The Comac C949 is a planned long-range supersonic twinjet airliner family being developed by Chinese aircraft manufacturer, Comac.

== Development ==
On 29 March 2025, South China Morning Post reported that Comac had initiated work on the C949.

== Specifications ==
General characteristics

- Capacity: 48 passengers
- Powerplant: 2 × turbofans

Performance

- Maximum speed: Mach 1.7
- Range: 6,000 nmi (6,900 mi, 11,000 km)

== See also ==
- Comac C929
- Comac C939
- Boom Overture
