= Comac C909 =

Chinese regional airliner

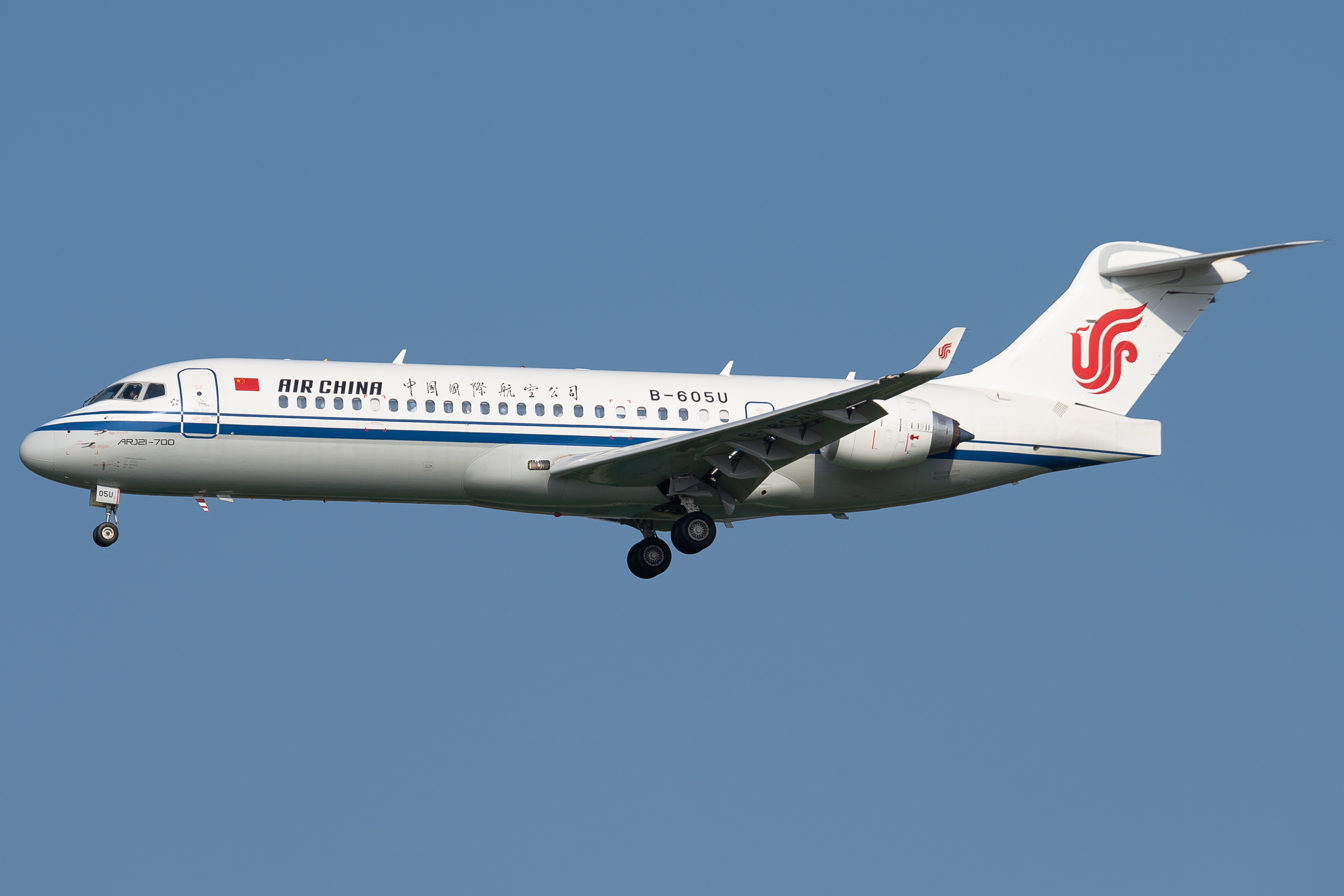
- C909 ER of Air China, the type's second largest operator

General information
- Other name: ARJ21 Xiangfeng
- Type: Narrow-body jet airliner
- National origin: China
- Manufacturer: Comac
- Designer: ACAC consortium; Antonov
- Status: In production, in service
- Primary users: Chengdu Airlines: Air China; China Southern Airlines; China Eastern Airlines
- Number built: 210 (as of March 2026)

History
- Manufactured: 2007–present
- Introduction date: 28 June 2016 with Chengdu Airlines
- First flight: 28 November 2008; 17 years ago
- In service: 2016-present

The Comac C909, originally known as the ARJ21 Xiangfeng (Chinese: 翔凤; pinyin: xiángfèng; lit. 'Soaring Phoenix'), is a 78–90 seat regional jet manufactured by the Chinese state-owned aerospace company Comac.

Development of the ARJ21 began in March 2002, led by the state-owned ACAC consortium. The first prototype was rolled out on 21 December 2007, and made its maiden flight on 28 November 2008 from Shanghai. It received its CAAC Type Certification on 30 December 2014 and was introduced on 28 June 2016 by Chengdu Airlines. The ACAC consortium was reorganized in 2008 as part of Comac and the jet was rebranded as the C909 in November 2024.

It features a 25° swept, supercritical wing designed by Antonov and twin rear-mounted General Electric CF34 engines. By 2025, 172 airframes had been delivered.

== Development ==
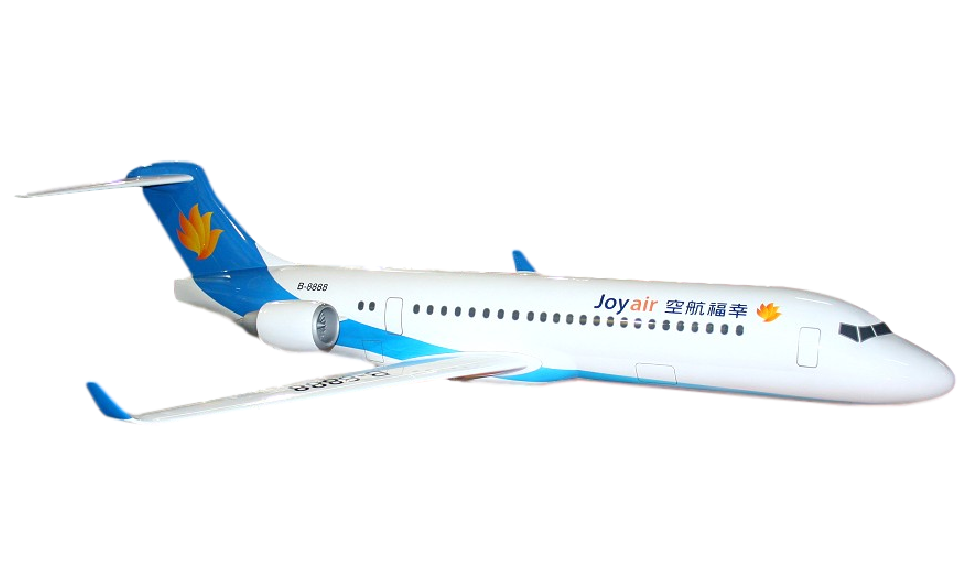
Joy Air ARJ21 Model at the 2008 China Airshow

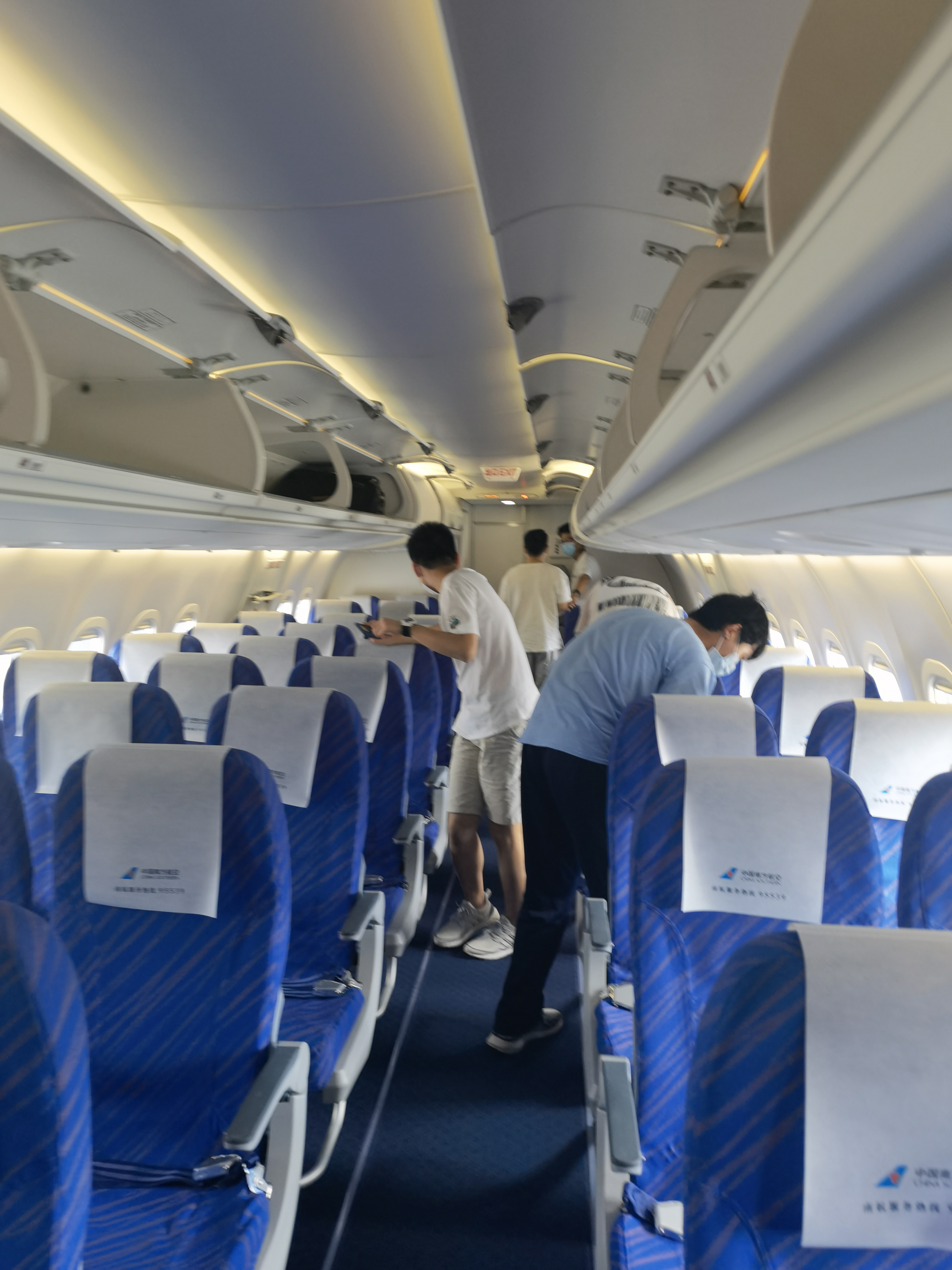
Typical economy cabin with 3-2 seating

In 1985, Shanghai Aircraft Manufacturing Company, now a part of Comac, launched a "troubled" partnership with McDonnell Douglas to co-produce the MD-80, a similar-looking small jet aircraft. After producing 20 MD-80s, the joint venture eventually collapsed, but China refused to return the tooling used. According to Western analysts, the ARJ21 is "heavily derived" from the MD-80, including its 1980s-era airframe which features a distinctive "double-bubble" fuselage cross-section. However, Chinese media state that the ARJ21 is an indigenous design.

The development of the ARJ21 (Advanced Regional Jet) was a key project in the "10th Five-Year Plan" of China. The project officially began in March 2002 and was led by the state-owned ACAC consortium. The maiden flight of the ARJ21 was initially planned to take place in 2005 with commercial service beginning 18 months later. The programme became eight years behind schedule. The design work was delayed and the final trial production stage did not begin until June 2006.

The first prototype (serial number 101) rolled out on 21 December 2007, with a maiden flight on 28 November 2008 at Shanghai's Dachang Airfield. The aircraft completed a long-distance test flight on 15 July 2009, flying from Shanghai to Xi'an in 2 hours 19 minutes, over a distance of 1,300 km. The second ARJ21 (serial number 102) completed the same test flight route on 24 August 2009. The third aircraft (serial number 103) similarly completed its first test flight on 12 September 2009. The fourth aircraft (CN 104) flew by November 2010. By August 2011, static, flutter and crosswind flight tests had been completed.

The ACAC consortium was reorganized in May 2008 and became a part of the then-newly formed Commercial Aircraft Corporation of China (abbreviated to Comac).

=== Key flight tests and CAAC certification ===
AC104 returned to China on 28 April 2014, after completing natural-icing tests in North America. This was the first time a turbofan-powered regional jet independently developed by China had flown abroad to carry out flight tests in special weather conditions. At the same time, other flight-test aircraft covered more than 30,000 km across Asia, America, Europe, and the Pacific and Atlantic oceans. Natural-icing tests are required for airworthiness certification, and conducting these tests outside China showed it was feasible to do certification tests for civil aircraft in other countries.

The first production aircraft flew on 18 June 2014. and AC104 completed an airspeed calibration flight on 30 October. Route-proving started on 29 October 2014, and AC105 made 83 flights between ten airports in Chengdu, Guiyang, Guilin, Haikou, Fuzhou, Zhoushan, Tianjin, Shijiazhuang, Yinchuan and Xianyang. The cumulative flight time was 173 hours and 55 minutes. By November 2014, AC104 had completed 711 flights in 1,442 hours and 23 minutes. Certification tests included stall, high-speed, noise and simulated and natural icing. AC105 returned to Yanliang airport on 16 December 2014, from Xi'an Xianyang International Airport after the last function and reliability flight. This completed the testing for the ARJ21-700 airworthiness certificate.

The ARJ21-700 received its Type Certification under Chapter 25 of the Chinese civil aviation regulations from the Civil Aviation Administration of China (CAAC), on 30 December 2014. The certification program for the CAAC required 5,000 hours. An ARJ21-700 completed a final demonstration flight on 12 September 2015 before being delivered to a customer.

=== Introduction ===
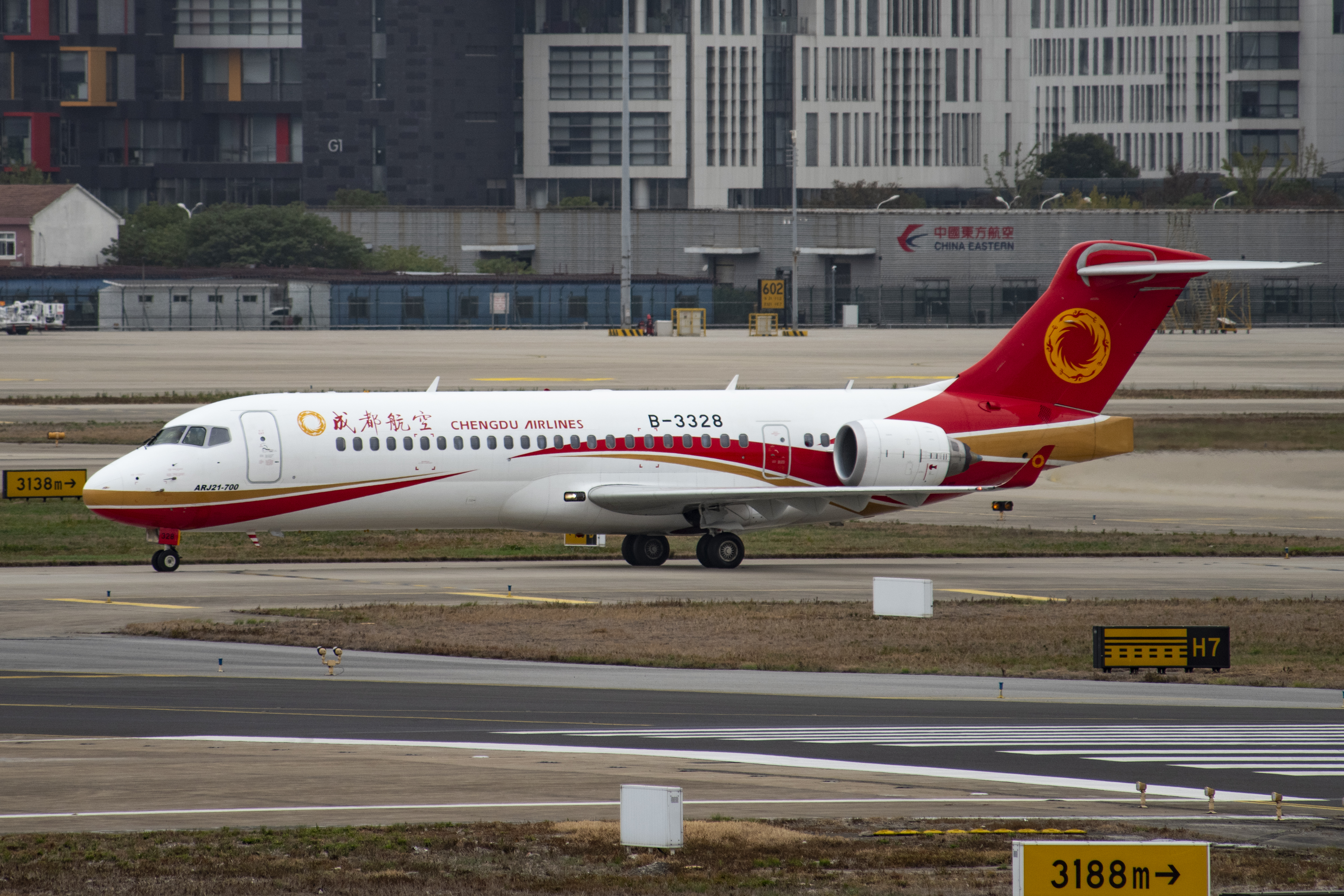
Chengdu Airlines' ARJ21 at Shanghai Hongqiao International Airport in 2019

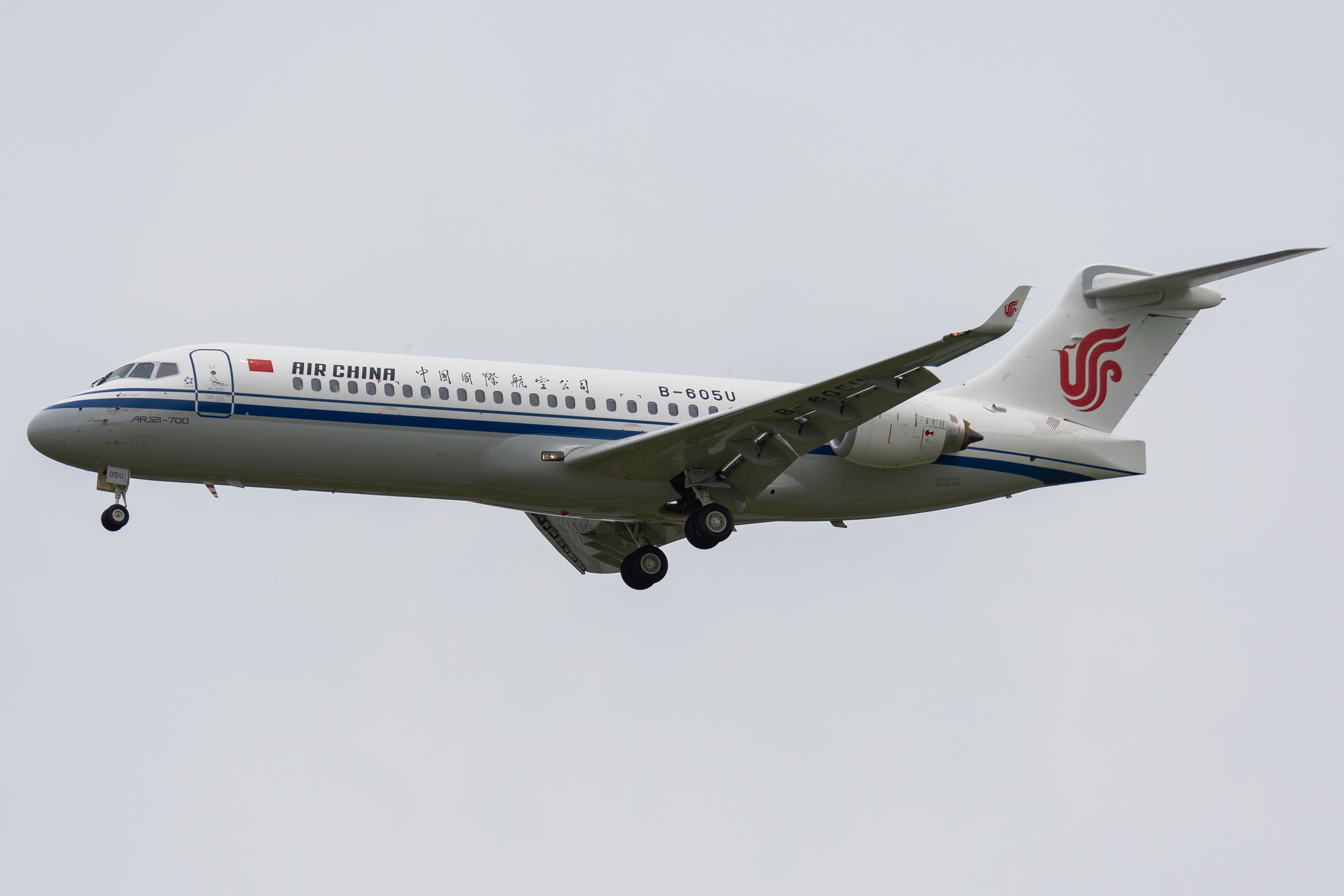
The first ARJ21 for Air China was delivered on 28 June 2020

On 29 November 2015, COMAC delivered the first ARJ21-700 to Chengdu Airlines. The first commercial flight took off from Chengdu Shuangliu Airport on 28 June 2016, landing in Shanghai two hours later, one day after its commercial flight was approved by the CAAC. During the summer schedule period of 2016, i.e. until 29 October 2016, the ARJ21-700 was scheduled to operate three weekly rotations between Chengdu and Shanghai Hongqiao. 85 flight segments were operated by ARJ21 (81 by B-3321, four by B-3322).

=== Further developments ===
In June 2018 an ARJ21-700+ was proposed for 2021 with weight and drag reductions. Subsequently, a -900 stretch version was designed to accommodate 115 all-economy seats, similar to the Bombardier CRJ900, Embraer E175-E2 or Mitsubishi MRJ90. Structurally conservative and designed for hot and high operations, the ARJ21's 25 t (55,000 lb) empty weight is higher than initially targeted in 2002, and also higher than competing aircraft. In 2018 an executive version was in final assembly and a cargo variant was proposed.

=== Freighter conversion program ===
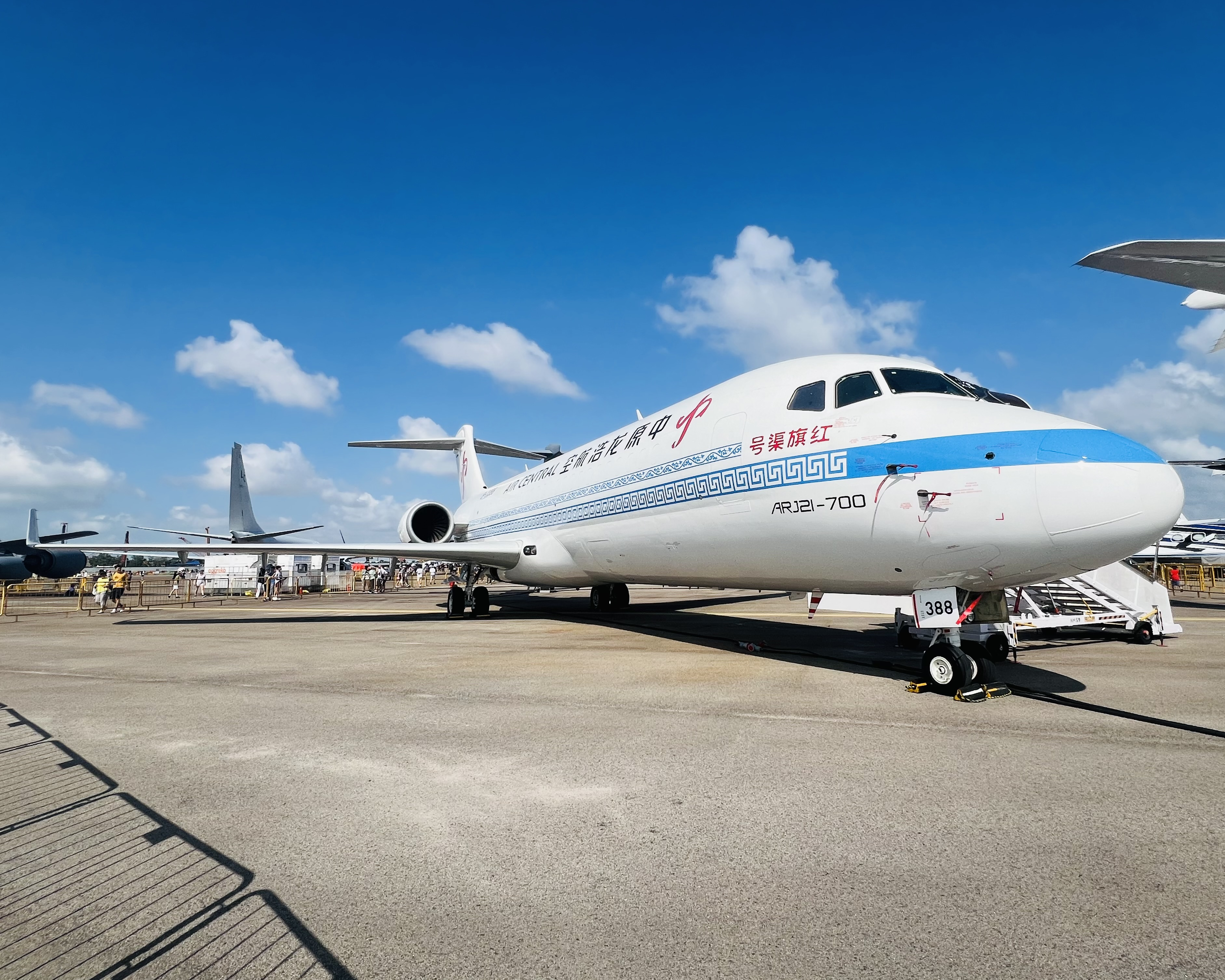
B-3388, one of the first two aircraft converted to ARJ21-700 CCF, in Air Central livery at the 2024 Singapore Airshow

The ARJ21 COMAC Converted Freighter (CCF) conversion program began in May 2020; the type certification and testing program was completed in December 2022 and the type certified by the CAAC on 1 January 2023.

The first two ARJ21 converted freighters (B-3329 and B-3388) were delivered to customers on 30 October 2023. The two airframes were initially delivered to Chengdu Airlines in 2018 in the passenger configuration and were subsequently withdrawn for the CCF program in 2021. Airframe B-3329 was handed over to YTO Cargo Airlines which intends to operate the type on short-haul international routes while airframe B-3388 was delivered to Air Central (based in Zhengzhou, China) for flights on domestic routes. The converted freighters have a maximum payload capacity of 10 tonnes and a range of about 1500 nautical miles (2780 km).

=== Production ===
In early July 2017, the CAAC certified the ARJ21 for mass production. On 6 March 2020, the first ARJ21 assembled at the second production line in Pudong, took its first production test flight. The second production line, with a production capacity of up to 30 jets a year, is located at the same facility that assembles the C919.

=== Rebranding ===
In October 2024, images of an ARJ21 in C909 livery emerged. Comac officially announced the rebranding at the Zhuhai Air Show in November 2024. This brings the naming in line with the convention of Comac's other two programmes, the C919 and C929.

=== International services ===
In July 2025, Air China commenced the first scheduled international services with the C909, with flights from Hohhot, China to the Mongolian capital of Ulaanbaatar.

== Design ==
Several sources have noted that the ARJ21 fuselage cross section is identical to the McDonnell Douglas MD-80 and the MD-90, which were produced under license in China. Comac states that the ARJ21 is a completely indigenous design. The ARJ21's development did depend heavily on foreign suppliers, including engines and avionics from the United States. The ARJ21 has a new supercritical wing designed by Antonov with a sweepback of 25 degrees and winglets. Some of China's supercomputers have been used to design parts for the ARJ21.

=== Frame ===
Members of the ACAC consortium, which was formed to develop the aircraft, manufacture major framework components of the aircraft:

- Chengdu Aircraft Industry Group: construction of the nose
- Xi'an Aircraft Company: construction of the wings and fuselage; wing designed by Antonov
- Shenyang Aircraft Corporation: construction of the empennage
- Shanghai Aircraft Company: final assembly

=== Engine ===
The inflight power source of COMAC C909 is General Electric CF-34 turbofan, which is also widely used on other regional jets like the Mitsubishi CRJ and Embraer E-Jets.

=== Avionics ===
COMAC chose Collins Aerospace Pro Line 21 integrated avionics system (IAS) as their flight deck avionics solution, they also supply the FMS-4200 flight management system (FMS) for the C909, which can also be seen on Mitsubishi CRJ550/700/900/1000 regional aircraft and the weather radar.

== Variants ==
=== C909 STD ===
The C909 STD is the baseline variant of the C909 family.

=== C909 ER ===
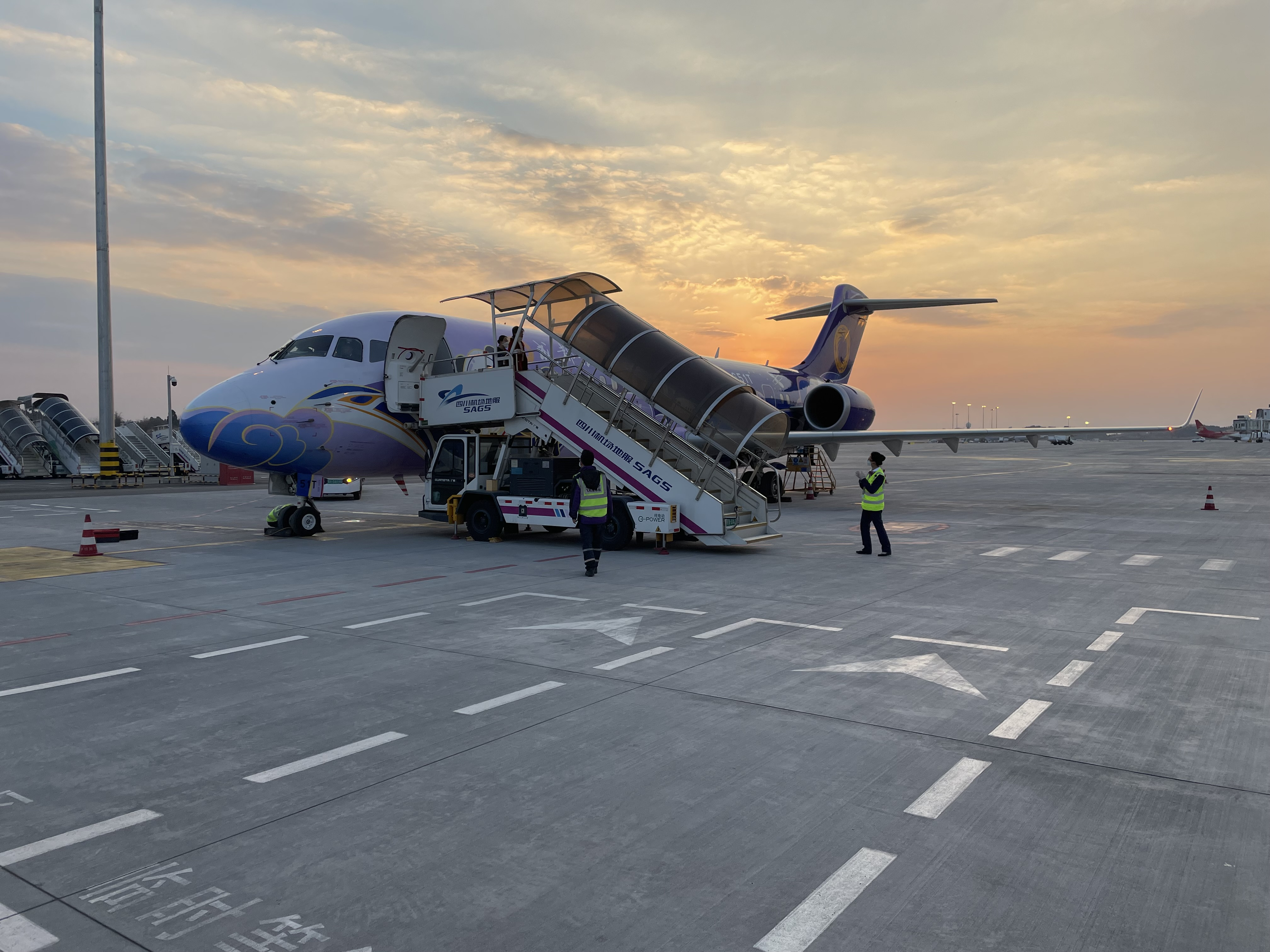
Chengdu Airlines C909 ER at Chengdu Tianfu International Airport

The C909 ER is the extended-range variant of the C909 family. It has an increased maximum takeoff weight (MTOW), maximum landing weight (MLW) and maximum taxi weight (MTW) compared to the C909 STD, therefore expanded the aircraft's performance envelope and range capability without having to install auxiliary fuel tanks (ACT).

==== C909 CBJ ====
The C909 CBJ (COMAC Business Jet) is the corporate jet variant of the C909. It has received its type certificate from the CAAC.

==== C909 CCF ====
The C909 CCF (COMAC Converted Freighter) is designed with a maximum payload of 9,467 kg and is compatible with PMC, PAG and AKE cargo containers. It has received its type certificate from the CAAC. The first aircraft began conversion operations on 22 December 2022 at GAMECO in Guangzhou, China. The first batch of conversions involves two C909ER [ARJ21-700 ER] aircraft originally built and operated by Chengdu Airlines and returned to COMAC in 2021.

On 30 December 2023, it is reported that COMAC has delivered two C909 CCF aircraft to YTO Cargo Airlines and Air Central in Guangzhou, making it COMAC's first step in the converted cargo aircraft market.

==== C909 EMJ ====
The C909 EMJ (Emergency Management Jet) is the dedicated rescue response variant of the C909 family. It has received its type certificate from the CAAC.

On 20 February 2024, it is reported that the Chinese state-owned Henan Civil Aviation Development and Investment Group ordered 6 C909 variants including the C909 EMJ.

==== C909 FFJ ====
The C909 FFJ (Fire-Fighting Jet) is a specially modified variant dedicated for fire fighting missions. It was first announced at the 2025 Paris Air Show. It is equipped with fire detection and surveillance equipments and is designed with multi-mission capabilities. As of June 2025, the variant is still under development. The variant is equipped with a water tank that has a capacity of up to 10 tonnes (22,000 lb; 10,000 kg), as well as 19 seats for evacuation requirements.

On 20 February 2024, it is reported that the Chinese state-owned Henan Civil Aviation Development and Investment Group ordered 6 C909 variants including the C909 FFJ.

==== C909 MSJ ====
The C909 MSJ (Medical Service Jet) is a variant dedicated for medical rescue/transport missions. It has received its type certificate from the CAAC.

On 20 February 2024, it was reported that the Chinese state-owned Henan Civil Aviation Development and Investment Group ordered 6 C909 variants including the C909 MSJ.

== Operators ==
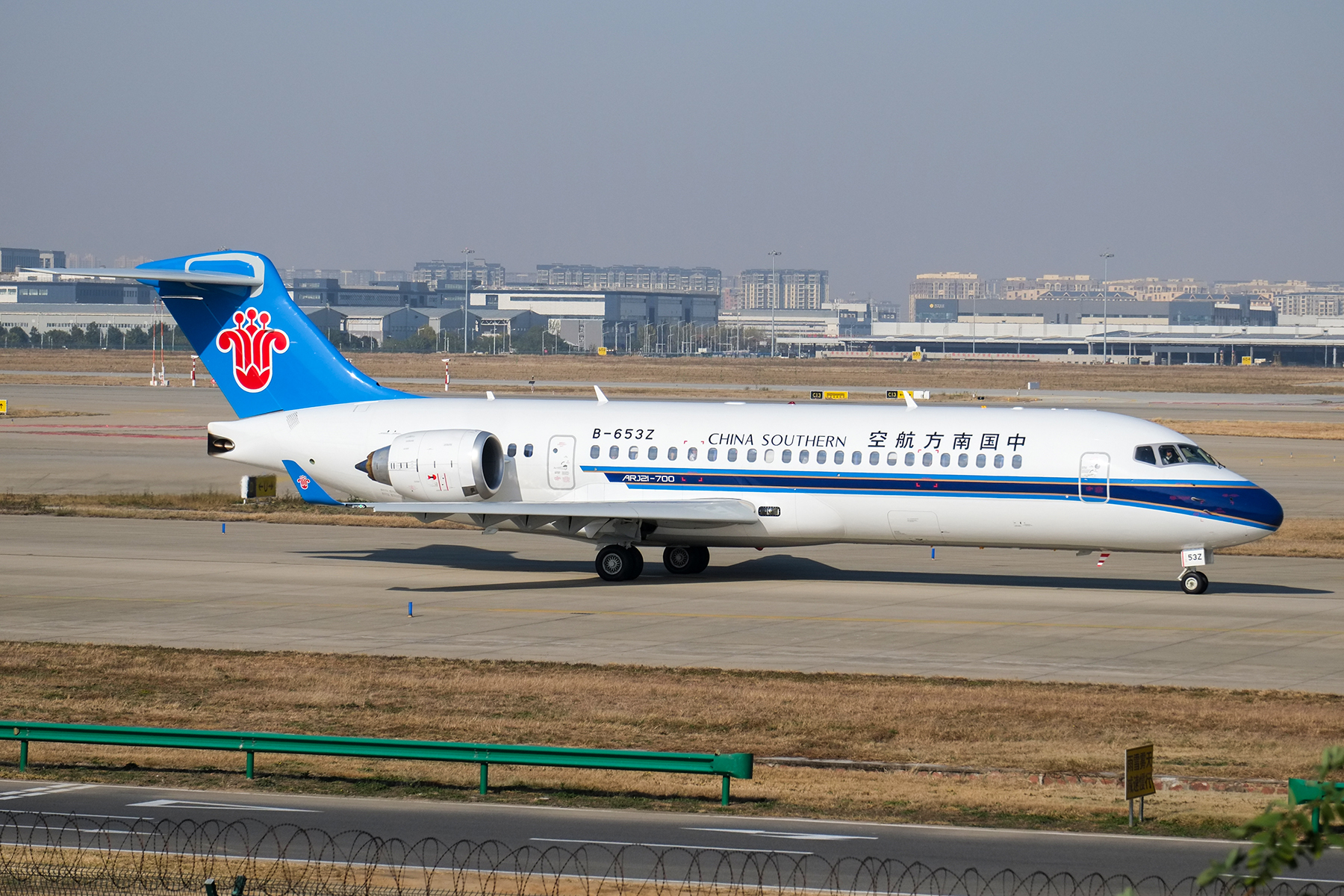
China Southern Airlines' ARJ21

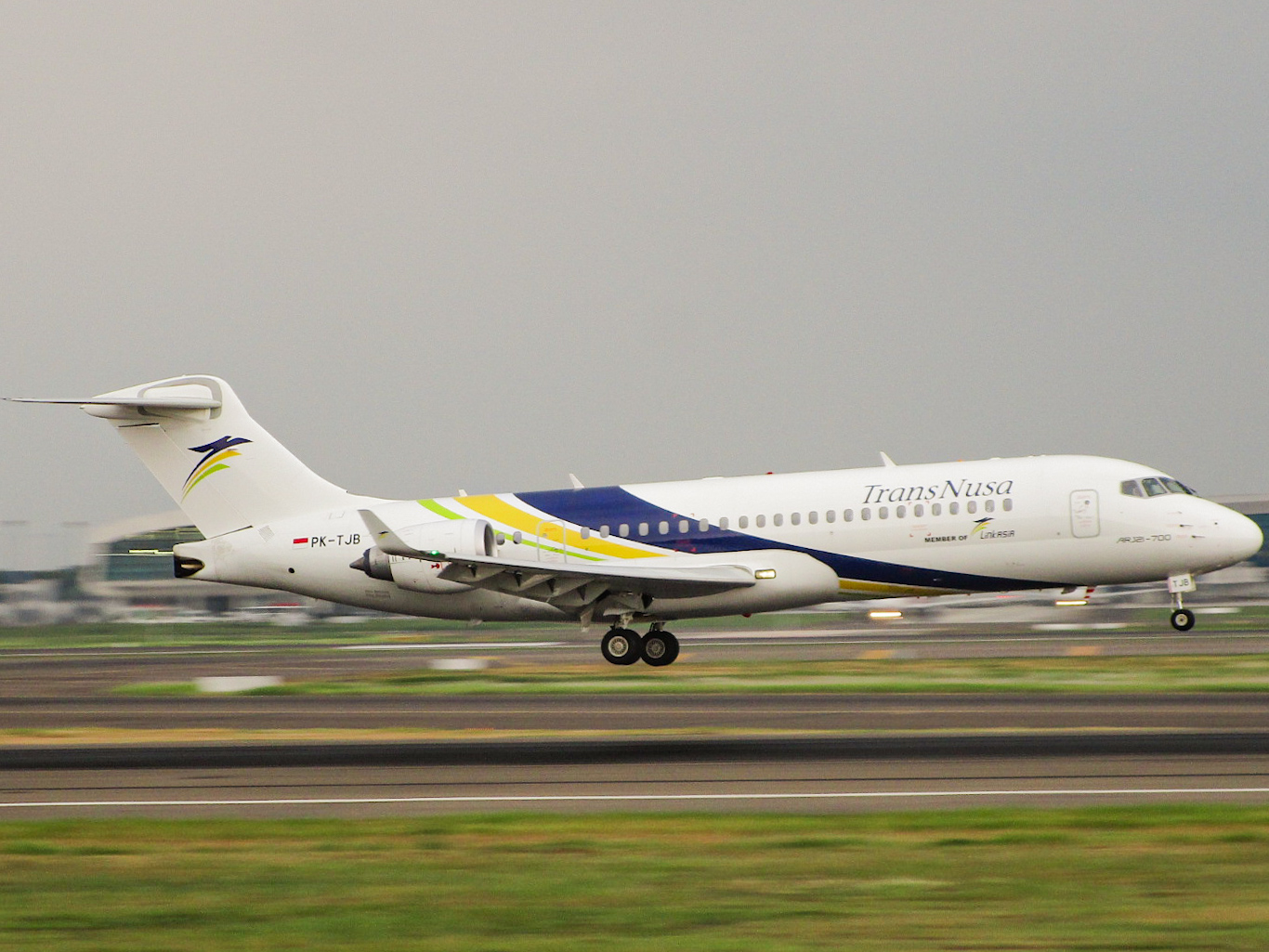
TransNusa ARJ21, the first operator outside China

As of March 2026, there were 210 aircraft in commercial service.

=== Orders and deliveries ===
As of 9 April 2025, Comac had 386 outstanding orders, after 23 deliveries to launch operator Chengdu Airlines who put it in service on 28 June 2016.

On 30 March 2025, COMAC announced the delivery of the first C909 aircraft to Lao Airlines. Lao Airlines thereby becomes the second operator outside China (after Indonesia's TransNusa) to take delivery of this type.

A third international operator, VietJet of Vietnam, started operating two C909 planes wet-leased from the Chinese Chengdu Airlines on domestic Vietnamese routes on 19 April 2025. In April 2026, Vietjet announced the lease of an additional 10 C909s from SPDB Financial Leasing for use on flights between Vietnam and China.

==== Firm orders ====
The following table is current as of 15 March 2025. Note that the numbers listed in the table have been obtained by cross-referencing the two web-based sources cited in the footnotes. Also note that the numbers listed are for the initial annual deliveries to (non-COMAC) commercial operators and do not necessarily reflect the number of airframes currently operated by each listed operator; as a result, the total number delivered may exceed the total number of airframes cited in the original contracts.

Date	Airline	Confirmed (+Options)	Deliveries										
Date	Airline	Confirmed (+Options)	2015	2016	2017	2018	2019	2020	2021	2022	2023	2024	2025
8/30/2019	Air China	35						3	4	8	9	9	1
1/2010	Chengdu Airlines	30	1	1	2	6	8	6	6	4		5	
8/30/2019	China Eastern Airlines	35						2	5	10		7	2
11/2020	China Express Airlines	50						2	1	3	2	2	1
8/30/2019	China Southern Airlines	35						3	4	8	9	9	
12/2019	China Flight General Aviation Company (CFGAC)	2					1	1				1	
8/20/2018	Genghis Khan Airlines	25 (+25)					3	2			1	1	
1/2020	Jiangxi Air	5						3	2				
	Urumqi Air	5											
12/2022	TransNusa	30								1	1	1	
3/2025	Lao Airlines	2											1
11/2024	Hainan Airlines	40											
11/2024	Colorful Guizhou Airlines	20 (+10)											
Totals		314 (+35)	1	1	2	6	12	22	22	34	22	35	5
Totals		314 (+35)	162										

==== Non-firm orders ====
Date	Airline	Type				Options	Rights
Date	Airline	ARJ21-700	ARJ21-700F	ARJ21-700P2F	ARJ21B	Options	Rights
September 2003	Shanghai Airlines	5					
September 2003	Shandong Airlines	10					
September 2003	Shenzhen Financial Leasing	20					
March 2004	Xiamen Airlines (Note: Although the Xiamen Airlines order for six was reported in some press as firm, ACAC's own web site still shows them as "options")	37					
March 2008	Joy Air	50					
May 2010	Merukh Enterprises	10					
11 November 2014	Equatorial Congo Airlines	4					
9 March 2015	ICBC Leasing	30					
October 2022	Longhao Airlines		50				
November 2022	YTO Cargo Airlines	70		2			
20 September 2023	GallopAir	12		3			
10 September 2025	Air Cambodia	10				10	
Totals		263 Orders				10	

==== Cancelled orders ====
Date	Customer	Orders	Options (LOI/MOU)	All
December 2007	Henan Airlines	100		100
March 2008	GECAS	5	20	25

Note: Companies ceased operations

== Specifications ==
Official designation	ARJ21-700 STD	ARJ21-700 ER		
Marketing name	C909 STD	C909 ER	C909 CBJ	C909 CCF
Cockpit crew	Two			
Seating capacity	90 (1-class); 78 (2-class)		20 (VIP)	Cargo
Seat pitch	31 in (1-class), 36 & 32 in (2-class)		VIP	/
Length	33.46 m (109 ft 9 in)			
Wingspan	27.28 m (89 ft 6 in)			
Wing area	79.86 m^{2} (859.6 sq ft)			
Wing sweepback	25 degrees			
Height	8.44 m (27 ft 8 in)			
Cabin width	3.14 m (10 ft 4 in)			
Cabin height	2.03 m (6 ft 8 in)			
Aisle width	48.3 cm (19.0 in)		VIP	/
Seat width	45.5 cm (17.9 in)		VIP	/
OEW	24,955 kg (55,016 lb)		24,900 kg (54,900 lb)	24,666 kg (54,379 lb)
MZFW	33,890 kg (74,710 lb)			34,163 kg (75,317 lb)
MTW	40,580 kg (89,460 lb)	43,580 kg (96,080 lb)		
MTOW	40,500 kg (89,300 lb)	43,500 kg (95,900 lb)		
MLW	37,665 kg (83,037 lb)	40,455 kg (89,188 lb)		
Max. payload	8,935 kg (19,698 lb)		8,000 kg (18,000 lb)	9,467 kg (20,871 lb)
Cargo capacity	20.14 m^{3} (711 cu ft)			115.48 m^{3} (4,078 cu ft)
Take-off run at MTOW	1,700 m (5,600 ft)	1,900 m (6,200 ft)		
Service ceiling	11,900 m (39,000 ft)			
Max. operating speed	Mach 0.82 (870 km/h; 470 kn; 541 mph)			
Normal cruise speed	Mach 0.78 (828 km/h; 447 kn; 514 mph)			
Range (fully loaded)	1,200 nmi (2,200 km; 1,400 mi)	2,000 nmi (3,700 km; 2,300 mi)		
Maximum fuel load	10,386 kg (22,897 lb)			
Powerplants (2x)	General Electric CF34-10A			
Engine thrust	75.87 kN (17,057 lbf)			

- Notes: Data are provided for reference only. STD = Standard Range, ER = Extended Range
- Sources: ARJ21 Series, ICAS

== See also ==
- Comac C939

Aircraft of comparable role, configuration, and era

- Antonov An-148
- Sukhoi Superjet 100
- Bombardier CRJ700 series
- Embraer E-Jets
- Fokker 100
- Boeing 717
- Mitsubishi Regional Jet

Related lists

- List of jet airliners
- List of airliners
- List of Chinese aircraft
