= List of commercial jet airliners =

The following is the list of purpose-built passenger jet airliners. It excludes turboprop and reciprocating engine powered airliners. It also excludes business jets and aircraft designed primarily for the transportation of air cargo. In addition it excludes military aircraft of all types, even those that are/were developed from or are/were based on the passenger airliners listed.

Type	Country of origin	Engines (Note: engines, excluding auxiliary power units or other turbines which do not provide significant aircraft thrust)	Years manufactured	First flight	Airline service entry	End of production	Number built	Number in service (Note: As of July 2020; on-order numbers are omitted; reference and year apply unless otherwise stated.)	Year retired (Note: "Retired" is from all services unless otherwise noted.)
Aérospatiale-BAC Concorde	UK/France	4	1965–1979	1969	1976	1979	20	0	2003
Airbus A220	Canada	2	2012–present	2013	2016	in production	482	478	in service
Airbus A300	Multinational	2	1971–2007	1972	1974	2007	561	209	in service
Airbus A310	Multinational	2	1981–1998	1982	1983	1998	255	47	in service
Airbus A318	Multinational	2	2001–2013	2002	2003	2013	80	41	in service
Airbus A319	Multinational	2	1994–2021	1995	1996	in production	1,525	1,262	in service
Airbus A320	Multinational	2	1986–2021 (A320ceo), 2012–present (A320neo)	1987	1988	in production	7,087	6,485	in service
Airbus A321	Multinational	2	1992–2021 (A321ceo), 2014–present (A321neo)	1993	1994	2021 (A321ceo), in production (A321neo)	1,784 (A321ceo), 1,996 (A321neo)	1,697 (A321ceo), 1,996 (A321neo)	in service
Airbus A330	Multinational	2	1992–present	1992	1994	in production	1,474	1,289	in service
Airbus A330neo	Multinational	2	2015–present	2017	2018	in production	185	185	in service
Airbus A340	Multinational	4	1991–2012	1991	1993	2011	377	180	in service
Airbus A350	Multinational	2	2010–present	2013	2014	in production	699	698	in service
Airbus A380	Multinational	4	2007–2021	2005	2007	2021	251	215	in service
Antonov An-148/An-158	Ukraine	2	2004–present	2004	2009	in production	37	8	in service
Avro Canada C102 Jetliner	Canada	4	1949	1949	cancelled	1949	1	0	cancelled
Baade 152	East Germany	4	1958	1958	cancelled	1961	3	0	cancelled
BAC One-Eleven	UK (Note: Also built under license in Romania)	2	1963–1982	1963	1965	1989	244	0	2019
Boeing 707	United States	4	1956–1978	1957	1958	1978	865	0	2013
Boeing 717	United States	2	1998–2006	1998	1999	2006	155	98 (Note: December 2024)	in service
Boeing 720	United States	4	1959–1967	1959	1960	1967	154	0	2010
Boeing 727	United States	3	1962–1984	1963	1964	1984	1,831	44	2019
Boeing 737	United States	2	1966–present	1967	1968	in production	12,220	8,024 (Note: December 2024)	in service
Boeing 747	United States	4	1968–2023	1969	1970	2023	1,573	410 (Note: December 2024)	in service
Boeing 757	United States	2	1981–2004	1982	1983	2004	1,049	559 (Note: December 2024)	in service
Boeing 767	United States	2	1981–present	1981	1982	in production	1,351	849 (Note: December 2024)	in service
Boeing 777	United States	2	1993–present	1994	1995	in production	1,776	1,416	in service
Boeing 777X	United States	2	2017–present	2020	2027 (expected)	in production	5	n/a	n/a
Boeing 787 Dreamliner	United States	2	2007–present	2009	2011	in production	1,249	1,173 (Note: December 2024)	in service
Bombardier CRJ100/200/440	Canada	2	1991–2006	1991	1992	2006	1,021	621	in service
Bombardier CRJ700/705/900/1000	Canada	2	1999–2020	1999	2001	2020	924	825	in service
British Aerospace 146/Avro RJ	UK	4	1983–2001	1981	1983	2001	387	89	in service
Comac C909	China	2	2007–present	2008	2016	in production	171 (Note: February 2025)	157 (Note: February 2025)	in service
Comac C919	China	2	2015–present	2017	2023	in production	24	16	in service
Comac C929	China	2	-	in design	-	-	0	-	-
Comac C939	China	2	-	in design	-	-	0	-	-
Convair 880	United States	4	1959–1962	1959	1960	1962	65	0	1998
Convair 990 Coronado	United States	4	1961–1963	1961	1962	1963	37	0	September 1987 (1994 with NASA)
Dassault Mercure 100	France	2	1971–1975	1971	1974	1975	12	0	1995
de Havilland DH 106 Comet	UK	4	1949–1964	1949	1952	1964	114	0	1997
Douglas DC-8	United States	4	1958–1972	1958	1959	1972	556	0	2015
Embraer E-Jet family	Brazil	2	2001–present	2002	2004	in production	1,850 (Note: December 2024)	1,607 (Note: December 2024)	in service
Embraer E-Jet E2 family	Brazil	2	2016–present	2016	2018	in production	155 (Note: December 2024)	131 (Note: December 2024)	in service
Embraer ERJ family	Brazil	2	1992–2020	1995	1996	2020	1,231	610	in service
Fairchild Dornier 328JET	Germany	2	1996–2002	1998	1999	2002	110	18	in service
Fokker F28 Fellowship	Netherlands	2	1967–1987	1967	1969	1987	241	0	2020
Fokker 70	Netherlands	2	1992–1997	1993	1994	1997	48	13	in service
Fokker 100	Netherlands	2	1986–1997	1986	1988	1997	283	87	in service
Hawker Siddeley HS121 Trident	UK	3 (Note: The stretched Trident 3B variant added a fourth "boost engine" in the tail for additional takeoff thrust.)	1962–1978	1962	1964	1978	117	0	1995
Ilyushin Il-62	USSR/Russia	4	1963–1995	1963	1967	1995	292	15	in service
Ilyushin Il-86	USSR	4	1976–1991	1976	1980	1995	106	0	2011 (Note: civilian service)
Ilyushin Il-96	Russia	4	1992–present	1988	1992	in production	33 (Note: October 2023)	15	in service
Lockheed L-1011 TriStar	United States	3	1968–1984	1970	1972	1984	250	1	2014
McDonnell Douglas DC-9	United States	2	1965–1982	1965	1965	1982	976	34	2014
McDonnell Douglas DC-10/MD-10	United States	3	1969–1989	1970	1971	1988	386		2014
McDonnell Douglas MD-11	United States	3	1988–2000	1990	1990	2000	200	0	2014
McDonnell Douglas Super 80/MD-80	United States (Note: Some MD-82 versions were also built under license in China as MD-82T Trunkliners.)	2	1979–1999	1979	1980	1999	1,191	250	in service
McDonnell Douglas MD-90	United States	2	1993–2000	1993	1995	2000	116		2020
Mitsubishi SpaceJet	Japan	2	2015	2015	cancelled	2020	8	0	cancelled
Rombac 1-11	Romania (Note: Built in Romania at Romaero under license)	2	1982–1989	1982	1983	1993	9	0	2019
Shanghai Y-10	China	4	1980	1980	cancelled	1980	3	0	cancelled
Sud Aviation SE-210 Caravelle	France	2	1955–1972	1955	1959	1973	282	0	2005
Sukhoi Superjet 100	Russia	2	2007–present	2008	2011	in production	221 (Note: February 2022)	162 (Note: December 2024)	in service
Tupolev Tu-104	USSR	2	1956–1960	1955	1956	1960	201	0	1981
Tupolev Tu-110	USSR	4	1957	1957	cancelled	1957	4	0	cancelled
Tupolev Tu-124	USSR	2	1960–1965	1960	1962	1965	164	0	1990
Tupolev Tu-134	USSR	2	1966–1989	1963	1967	1984	854	2	in service
Tupolev Tu-144	USSR	4	1967–1983	1968	1977	1983	16	0	1999
Tupolev Tu-154	USSR/Russia	3	1968–2013	1968	1972	2013	1,026	9	in service
Tupolev Tu-204/Tu-214	Russia	2	1990–present	1989	1996	in production	89 (Note: May 2021)	40	in service
Tupolev Tu-334	Russia	2	1999–2009	1999	cancelled	2009	2	0	cancelled
VFW-Fokker 614	Germany	2	1971–1978	1971	1975	1978	19	0	2012
Vickers VC10	UK	4	1962–1970	1962	1964	1970	54	0	2013
Yakovlev MC-21	Russia	2	n/a	2017	in flight test	-	5	-	-
Yakovlev Yak-40	USSR	3	1967–1981	1966	1968	1981	1,011	20	in service
Yakovlev Yak-42	USSR/Russia	3	1977–2003	1975	1980	2003	185	28	in service

== See also ==
- List of regional airliners

== Bibliography ==
- Stewart Wilson (1999), Airliners of the World, Aerospace Publications, ISBN 978-1875671441
- Paul Eden (2012), Civil Aircraft Recognition, Crowood, ISBN 978-1847974976
- Robert Jackson (2004), The Encyclopedia of Aircraft, Thunder Bay Press, ISBN 978-1592232574
- Bill Gunston (1980), The Illustrated Encyclopedia of Commercial Aircraft, Exeter Books, ISBN 978-0896730779
- Jeremy Flack (2003), Jane's Airlines and Airliners, Collins, ISBN 978-0007151745
- David Donald (1999), The Modern Civil Aircraft Guide, Chartwell Books, Incorporated, ISBN 978-0785810919
