= CRAIC =

CRAIC may refer to:

- China-Russia Commercial Aircraft International Co. Ltd., a joint venture established to manufacture the CRAIC CR929 airliner

== See also ==
- Craic, a term for news, gossip, fun, entertainment, and enjoyable conversation, particularly prominent in Ireland
- The Craic, a 1999 Australian comedy film
