= Shanghai Aircraft Design and Research Institute =

The Shanghai Aircraft Design and Research Institute (SADRI), previously known as Shanghai Aircraft Research Institute (SARI), is a Chinese design institute, part of the ACAC consortium. Founded in the 1970s as First Aircraft Design Institute Shanghai Branch it became a part of ACAC in 2002 and was renamed Shanghai Aircraft Design and Research Institute in 2009. The design institute's head office is located at 5 Yunjin Road next to Longhua Airport in the Xuhui District of Shanghai.

SADRI has done liaison engineering and airworthiness test for MD-82 and MD-90 airliners.

== Products ==
- Shanghai Y-10 - airliner
- Shaanxi Y-8 - co-designed reversed engineered transport aircraft with Shaanxi Aircraft Corporation
- ARJ21 - Regional jet airliner
- C919 - Narrow-body jet airliner
