= Shanghai Aircraft Manufacturing Company =

Chinese aircraft manufacturer

Shanghai Aircraft Manufacturing Company (Chinese: 上海飞机制造有限公司), formerly Shanghai Aircraft Manufacturing Factory, was founded in 1950 with a registered capital of four billion yuan, with two bases, Pudong and Dachang, with more than 5,000 employees. It is a Shanghai-based aerospace company with business in:

- aircraft manufacturing
- parts and components subcontractor
- repair and overhaul
- non-aerospace products: aerial ladders, hovercraft, glass wall manufacturing, Swerve rack for magnetic aerotrain

It now belongs to the Commercial Aircraft Corporation of China (COMAC) that was established in 2008.

== Aims ==
It aims to continuously enhance:

- the assembly and integration
- core key component manufacturing
- supply chain construction and management
- new technology, new method, new material application and development
- manufacturing process control
- civil aircraft delivery

And aims to shoulder the important mission of the development of China's large aircraft.

== Products ==
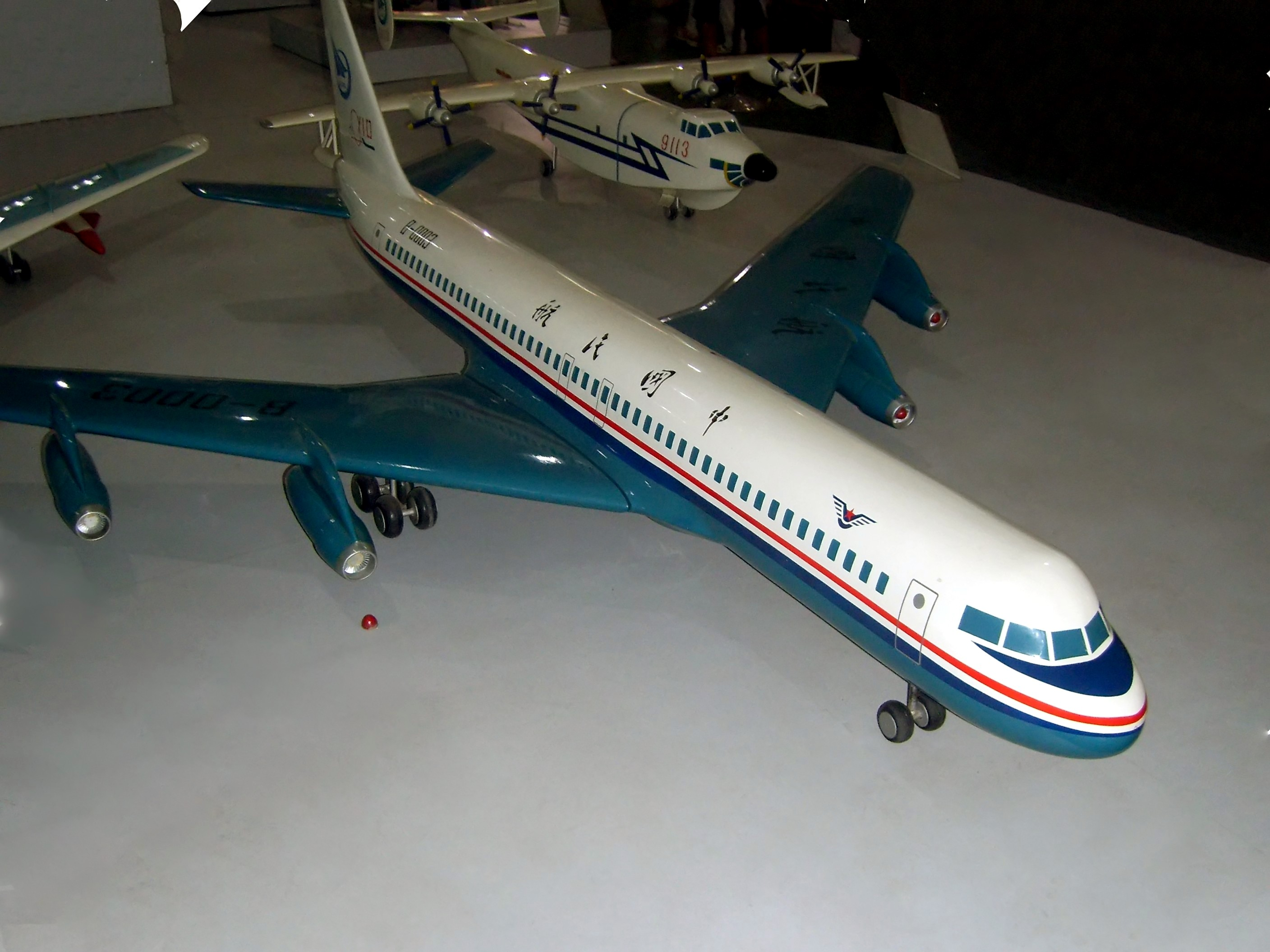
A model of the Shanghai Y-10

=== Regional Jets ===
- Comac ARJ21 - final assembly

=== Jetliners ===
- Shanghai Y-10 jetliner
- MD-82 jetliner
- MD-83 jetliner
- MD-90 jetliner
- Airbus single aisle family cargo door frame
- Boeing 737 tail section assembly and Boeing 777 vertical stabilizers.
- COMAC C919
- COMAC C929
