= Comac CE-25A =

Electric aircraft built by the Chinese Comac corporation

General information
- National origin: China
- Manufacturer: Comac
- Status: Under development
- Number built: 1

History
- First flight: 14 November 2026, Binzhou, Shandong Province, China

The Comac CE-25A is a narrow-body electric aircraft built by Chinese aerospace manufacturer Comac. Designed for short-haul regional commercial flights, the CE-25A can carry 19 passengers and can cruise at 300 km/h (190 mph) at an altitude of 2,400 m (7,900 ft), and has an approximate range of 400 km (250 miles). It is a distributed propulsion system via ten ducted fans mounted on top of the wings, with a maximum takeoff weight of 10 metric tons (22,000 lb).

== Development and test flights ==
The aircraft is being developed by Comac along with the battery manufacturer CATL, Shanghai Jiao Tong University, as well as other partners.

In July 2023, COMAC, together with CATL and Shanghai Jiao Tong University formed a joint venture with CNY 600 million capital. A CE-25A model was shown at the China International Import Expo in Shanghai in November 2023.

First images of the CE-25A were released in October 2026. The aircraft has a wide, flat-bottomed fuselage, T-tail and low-set, long-span wing, with ten distributed over-wing electric ducted fans. Five electric ducted-fans with scalloped exhausts are mounted on the rear upper surface of each wing.

Nineteen unmanned autonomous verification flights have been carried out during the development of the Comac CE-25A since February 2, 2026. Then, on November 14, 2026, its first piloted test flight was completed in Shandong province, where it was flown 60.4 kilometers in 16 minutes with two pilots and a flight test engineer on board. Video of the flight indicates the fans are mounted directly onto deployable flaps.

== See also ==
- List of electric aircraft
- List of Chinese aircraft
