= Comac C939 =

Chinese widebody passenger aircraft

General information
- Type: Wide-body jet airliner
- National origin: China
- Manufacturer: Comac
- Status: In preliminary design

The Comac C939 is a planned long-range wide-body twinjet airliner family being developed by Chinese Comac as a competitor to the Boeing 777X and Airbus A350. It is designed to be larger than the other two models in its domestically produced aircraft line: the Comac C919 and Comac C929.

== Design ==
In May 2024, the designs for the C939 were reported to have a capacity of four hundred to five hundred seats and a range of 7,000 nautical miles [nmi] (13,000 km; 8,100 mi). The C939 is expected to be a twinjet.

== Development ==
In June 2011, Comac was studying the 290-seat wide-body C929 and 390-seat C939 extra-wide-body aircraft. Preliminary plans for the C939 were mentioned in Chinese newspapers in 2015 and 2017.

In May 2024, South China Morning Post reported that Comac had started work on the C939.

== See also ==
Aircraft of comparable role, configuration, and era

- Airbus A350
- Boeing 777X
- Ilyushin Il-96-400M
