= Comac =

Chinese state-owned aerospace manufacturer

Coordinates: 31°05′51″N 121°51′09″E

Commercial Aircraft Corporation of China, Ltd.
- Native name: 中国商用飞机有限责任公司
- Type: State-owned
- Industry: Aviation
- Founded: 11 May 2008; 18 years ago
- Headquarters: Shanghai, China
- Area served: Worldwide
- Key people: He Dongfeng (Chairman); Zhao Yuerang (President)
- Products: CE-25A; C909; C919; C929; C939; C949
- Website: www.comac.cc

Commercial Aircraft Corporation of China, Ltd.
- Simplified Chinese: 中国商用飞机有限责任公司
- Traditional Chinese: 中國商用飛機有限責任公司
- Literal meaning: Commercial Aircraft Corporation of China, LLC.
Transcriptions
Standard Mandarin
- Hanyu Pinyin: Zhōngguó Shāngyòng Fēijī Yǒuxiàn Zérèn Gōngsī

Abbreviation
- Simplified Chinese: 中国商飞
- Traditional Chinese: 中國商飛
Transcriptions
Standard Mandarin
- Hanyu Pinyin: Zhōngguó Shāngfēi

The Commercial Aircraft Corporation of China, Ltd. (Chinese: 中国商用飞机有限责任公司), commonly trading as Comac (Chinese: 中国商飞, sometimes stylized as COMAC), is a Chinese state-owned aerospace manufacturer headquartered in. Pudong, Shanghai. Established on 11 May 2008, the company has a registered capital of RMB 19 billion (US$2.84 billion as of November 2026), and is the country's main designer of large commercial passenger aircraft.

The first aircraft marketed by Comac is the ARJ21 regional jet, which was jointly developed with China Aviation Industry Corporation I (AVIC I). This was followed by the C919 narrow-body aircraft, which can seat up to 168 passengers and made its maiden flight in 2017, entering into commercial service in March 2023.

== History ==
=== Origins ===
The Commercial Aircraft Corporation of China (Comac) was established on 11 May 2008 in Shanghai. It was established jointly by Aviation Industry Corporation of China (AVIC), Aluminum Corporation of China, Baosteel Group Corporation, Sinochem Group, Shanghai Guosheng Corporation Limited, and State-owned Assets Supervision and Administration Commission.

=== U.S. sanctions ===
In January 2021, the United States government named Comac as a company "owned or controlled" by the People's Liberation Army (PLA) and thereby prohibited any American company or individual from investing in it. In January 2025, Comac was added to a United States Department of Defense list of companies that allegedly work with the PLA. In May 2025, the U.S. tightened export controls on certain parts previously shipped to Comac.

== Products ==
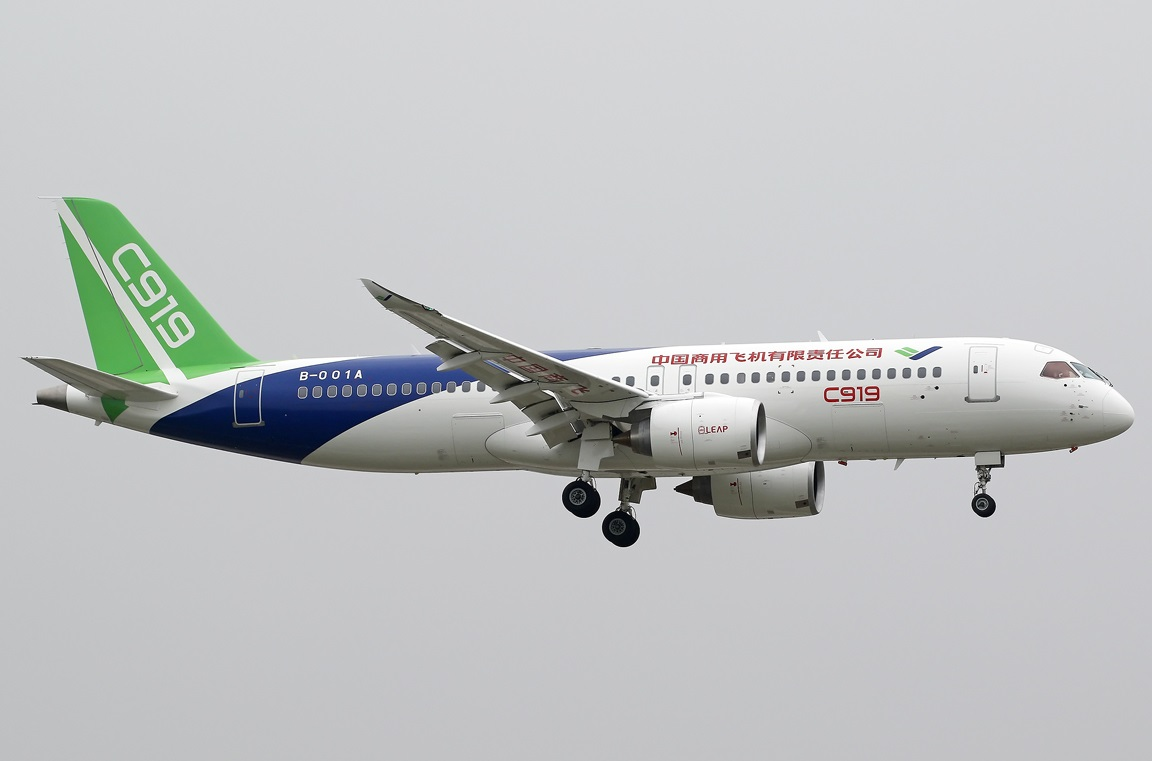
Comac C919 prototype in flight

For all models beginning with the 919, Comac's naming system for commercial airliners has taken the form of 9X9. In November 2024, Comac rebranded the ARJ21 as the C909 to match the format of the other models.

Aircraft	Description	Capacity	First flight	Ref.
CE-25A	Electric, 10-fan, single aisle, intercity	19	14 November 2026	
C909	Twin‑engine, single aisle, short-range	70−105	28 November 2008	
C919	Twin‑engine, single aisle, short- to medium-range	150−190	5 May 2017	
C929	Twin‑engine, twin aisle, long-range	250−290	2030 (deferred)	
C939	Twin‑engine, twin aisle, long- to ultra long-range	400		
C949	Twin‑engine, single aisle, supersonic			

=== Orders and deliveries ===
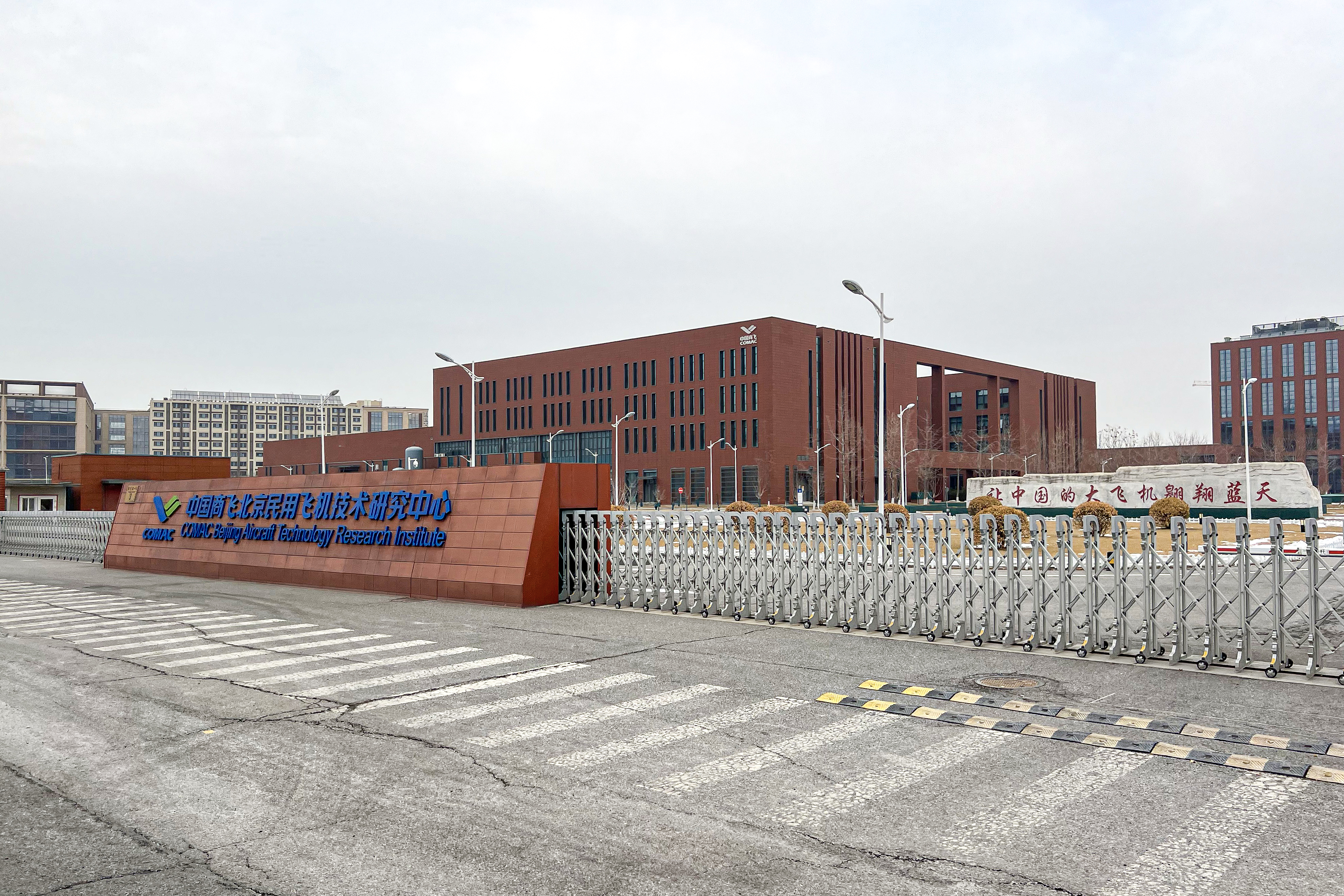
Comac Beijing Aircraft Technology Research Institute

As of December 2025.

Aircraft	Orders	Options	Deliveries	Backlog
CE-25A				
C909	312	35	169	154
C919	1,005	120	30	989
C929				
C939				
C949				
Total	1,317	155	185	1,143

== Collaborations ==
=== Bombardier ===
On 24 March 2011, Comac and the Canadian company Bombardier Inc. signed a framework agreement for a long-term strategic cooperation on commercial aircraft.

In May 2017, Bombardier and Comac began holding talks about an investment into Bombardier's passenger jet business.

=== Boeing ===
On 23 September 2015, Boeing announced plans to build a Boeing 737 completion and finishing plant in China. The facility will be used to paint exteriors and install interiors into airframes built in the United States. The joint-venture plant will be located in Zhoushan, Zhejiang.

=== Ryanair ===
In June 2011 Comac and Irish low-cost airline Ryanair signed an agreement to cooperate on the development of the C919, a 200-seat narrow-body commercial jet which will compete with the Boeing 737 and Airbus A320.

=== UAC ===
China-Russia Commercial Aircraft International Co. Ltd. (CRAIC), a joint venture company invested by Comac and Russia's United Aircraft Corporation (UAC) responsible for the development of a wide-body commercial jet, was established in Shanghai on 22 May 2017. Research and development for the new plane was to be conducted in Moscow, with aircraft to be assembled in Shanghai. Subsequently, the partnership was dropped, and by November 2023 Comac announced that it would develop the aircraft model (since rebranded C929) on its own.

== See also ==
- List of civil aircraft
- List of aircraft produced by China
- Aero Engine Corporation of China (AECC)
