= Jet airliner =

Passenger aircraft powered by jet engines

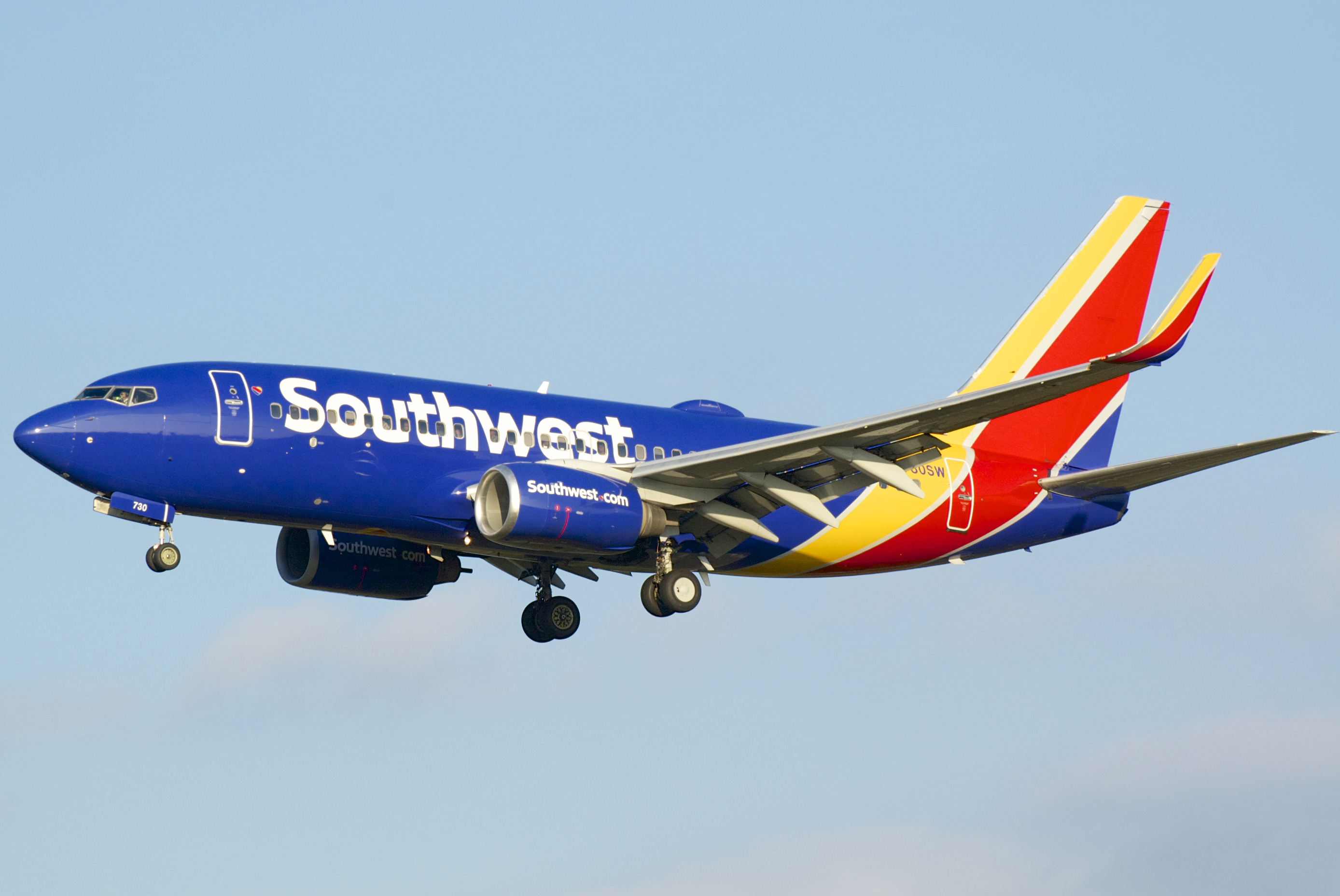
The Boeing 737 was for many years the most widespread jetliner

Sound of jet airliner overhead
The sound of a jet airliner passing overhead (starts at about 20 seconds)

A jet airliner or jetliner is a commercial fixed-wing aircraft (i.e. an airliner) propelled by jet engines. Jetliners can be used for both passengers and air freight, and are commonly classified as either the large wide-body aircraft, the medium narrow-body aircraft and the smaller regional jet.

Jetliners usually have two or four wing-mounted jet engines; three-engined designs, with an additional engine at the empennage, were popular in the 1970s but became less common afterwards. Most modern airlines (with the exception of rural regional airlines) have supplanted propeller aircraft with large jet aircraft because jets can carry much larger payloads and are capable of operating at much higher air speeds, thus making air transportation more efficient on a commercial scale. The first jetliners, introduced in the 1950s, used the simpler turbojet engine; these were quickly supplanted by designs using turbofans, which are quieter and more fuel-efficient.

== History ==
=== Early history ===
The first airliners with turbojet propulsion were experimental conversions of the Avro Lancastrian piston-engined airliner, which were flown with several types of early jet engine, including the de Havilland Ghost and the Rolls-Royce Nene. They retained the two inboard piston engines, the jets being housed in the outboard nacelles. The first airliner with jet power only was the Nene-powered Vickers VC.1 Viking G-AJPH, which first flew on 6 April 1948.

The early jet airliners had much lower interior levels of noise and vibration than contemporary piston-engined aircraft, so much so that in 1947, after piloting a jet powered aircraft for the first time, Wing Commander Maurice A. Smith, editor of Flight magazine, said, "Piloting a jet aircraft has confirmed one opinion I had formed after flying as a passenger in the Lancastrian jet test beds, that few, if any, having flown in a jet-propelled transport, will wish to revert to the noise, vibration and attendant fatigue of an airscrew-propelled piston-engined aircraft"

=== 1950s ===
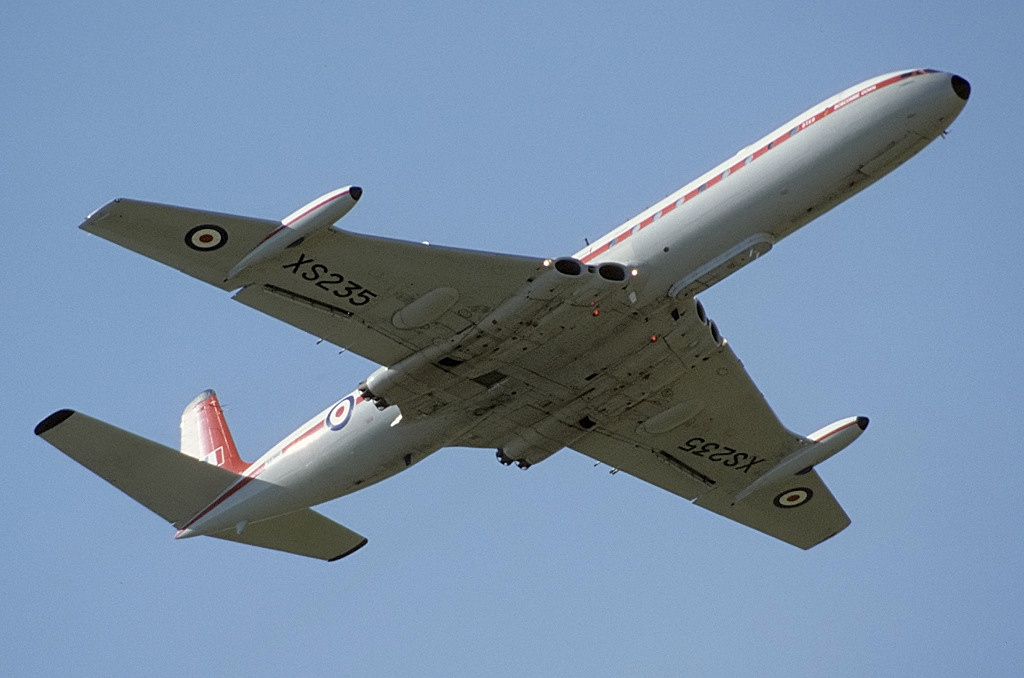
The de Havilland Comet, the first purpose-built jet airliner

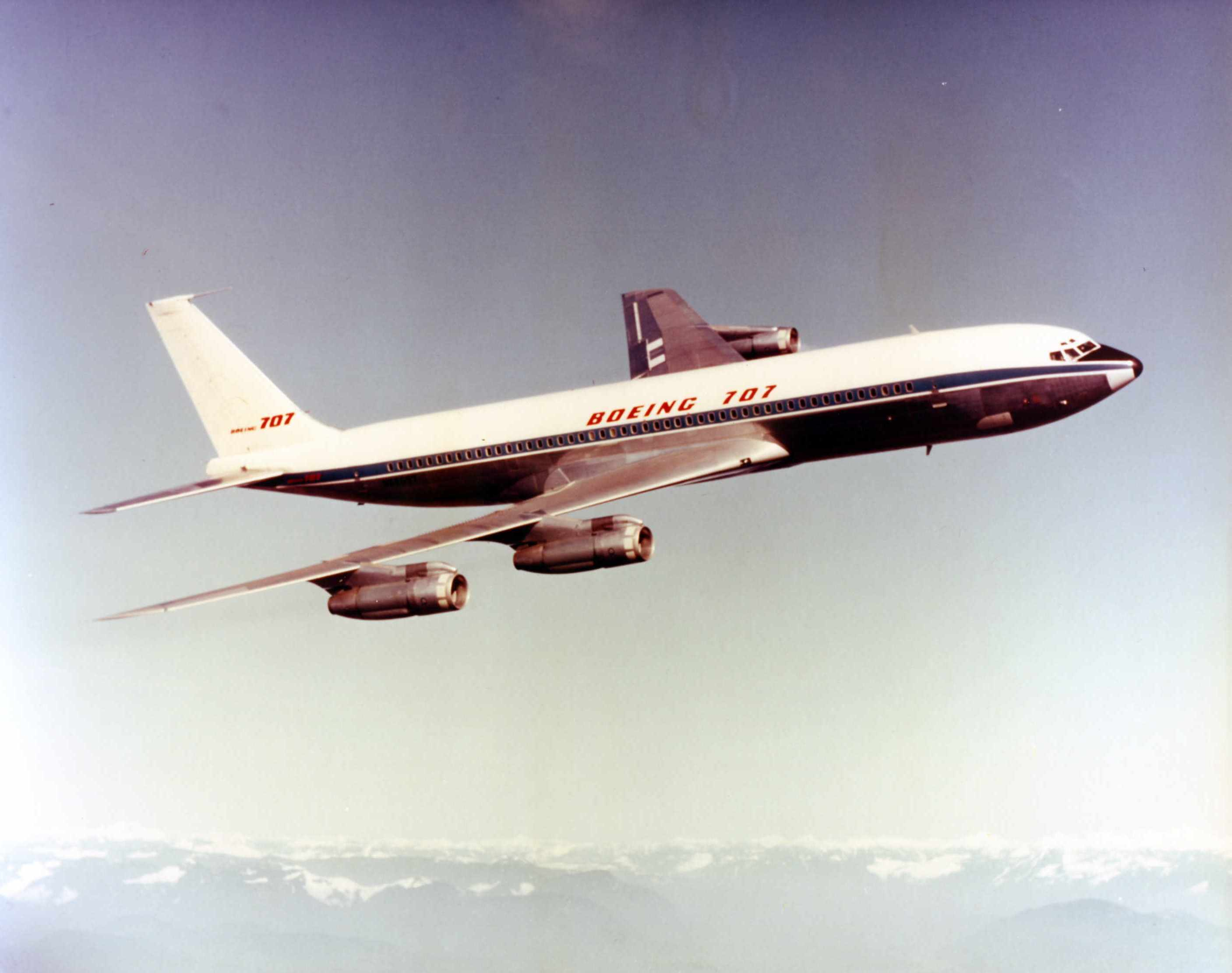
The Boeing 707, the first commercially successful jetliner

The first purpose-built jet airliner was the British de Havilland Comet which first flew in 1949 and entered service in 1952 with BOAC. It carried 36 passengers up to 2500 miles (4000 km) at a speed of 450mph (725 km/h). Serious structural problems arose not even two years after entering service and prompted several changes in design. The last original Comet was retrofitted in 1958. Also developed in 1949 was the Avro Canada C102 Jetliner, which never reached production; however, the term jetliner came into use as a generic term for passenger jet aircraft.

These first jet airliners were followed some years later by the Sud Aviation Caravelle from France, the Tupolev Tu-104 from the Soviet Union (2nd in service), and the Boeing 707, Douglas DC-8 and Convair 880 from the United States. National prestige was attached to developing prototypes and bringing these early designs into service. There was also a strong nationalism in purchasing policy, so that US Boeing and Douglas aircraft became closely associated with Pan Am, while BOAC ordered British Comets.

Pan Am and BOAC, with the help of advertising agencies and their strong nautical traditions of command hierarchy and chain of command (retained from their days of operating flying boats), were quick to link the "speed of jets" with the safety and security of the "luxury of ocean liners" in the public's perception.

Aeroflot used Soviet Tupolevs, while Air France introduced French Caravelles. Commercial realities dictated exceptions, however, as few airlines could risk missing out on a superior product: American Airlines ordered the pioneering Comet (but later cancelled when the Comet ran into metal fatigue problems), Canadian, British and European airlines could not ignore the better operating economics of the Boeing 707 and the DC-8, while some American airlines ordered the Caravelle.

Boeing became the most successful of the early manufacturers. The KC-135 Stratotanker and military versions of the 707 remain operational, mostly as tankers or freighters. The basic configuration of the Boeing, Convair and Douglas aircraft jet airliner designs, with widely spaced podded engines underslung on pylons beneath a swept wing, proved to be the most common arrangement and was most easily compatible with the large-diameter high-bypass turbofan engines that subsequently prevailed for reasons of quietness and fuel efficiency.

==== Innovations ====
The Pratt & Whitney JT3 turbojets powered the original Boeing 707 and DC-8 models; in the early 1960s the JT3 was modified into the JT3D low-bypass turbofan for long-range 707 and DC-8 variants.

The de Havilland and Tupolev designs had engines incorporated within the wings next to the fuselage, a concept that endured only within military designs while the Caravelle pioneered engines mounted either side of the rear fuselage.

=== 1960s ===
The 1960s jet airliners include the BAC One-Eleven and Douglas DC-9 twinjets; Boeing 727, Hawker Siddeley Trident and Tupolev Tu-154 trijets; and the paired multi-engined Ilyushin Il-62, and Vickers VC10. The world-renowned supersonic Concorde first flew in 1969 but proved to be an economical disaster. Only 14 ever entered service, and the last Concorde was retired in 2003.

==== Innovations ====
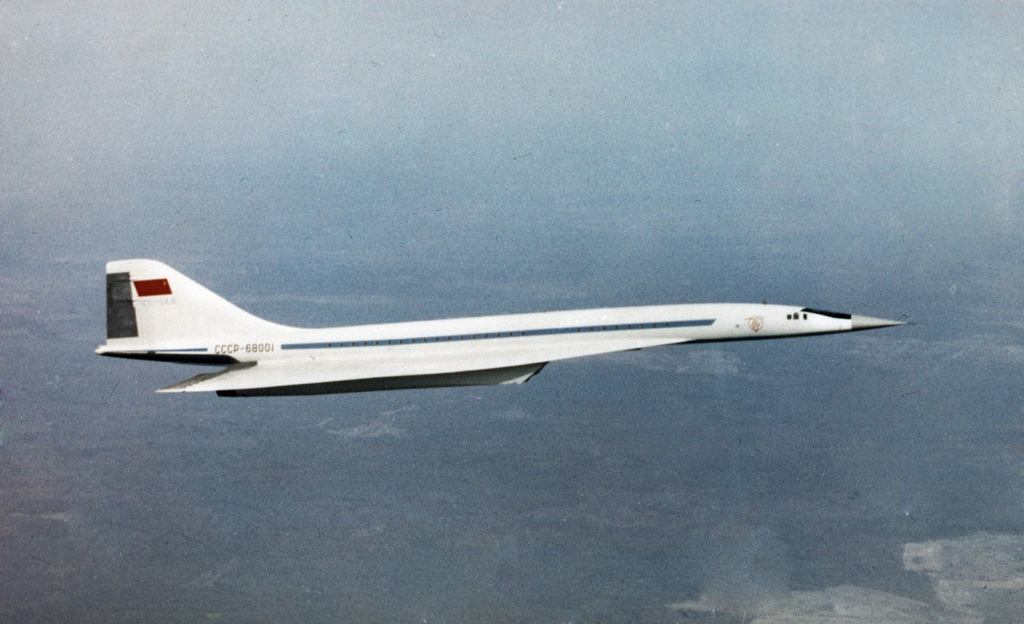
The Tupolev Tu-144, the first supersonic jet airliner

The 1960s jet airliners were known for the advancement of the more economical turbofan technology, which passes air around the engine core instead of through it. Jet airliners that entered service in the 1960s were powered by slim, low-bypass turbofan engines, many aircraft used the rear-engined, T-tail configuration, such as the BAC One-Eleven, Boeing 737, and Douglas DC-9 twinjets; Boeing 727, Hawker Siddeley Trident, Tupolev Tu-154 trijets; and the paired multi-engined Ilyushin Il-62, and Vickers VC10. The rear-engined T-tail arrangement is still used for jetliners with a maximum takeoff weight of less than 50 tons.

As of April 2023, 15,591 Boeing 737s have been ordered and 11,395 delivered, and it remains the most produced jet aircraft.

Other 1960s developments, such as rocket-assisted takeoff (RATO), water-injection, and afterburners (also known as reheat) used on supersonic jetliners (SSTs) such as Concorde and the Tupolev Tu-144, have been superseded.

=== 1970s ===
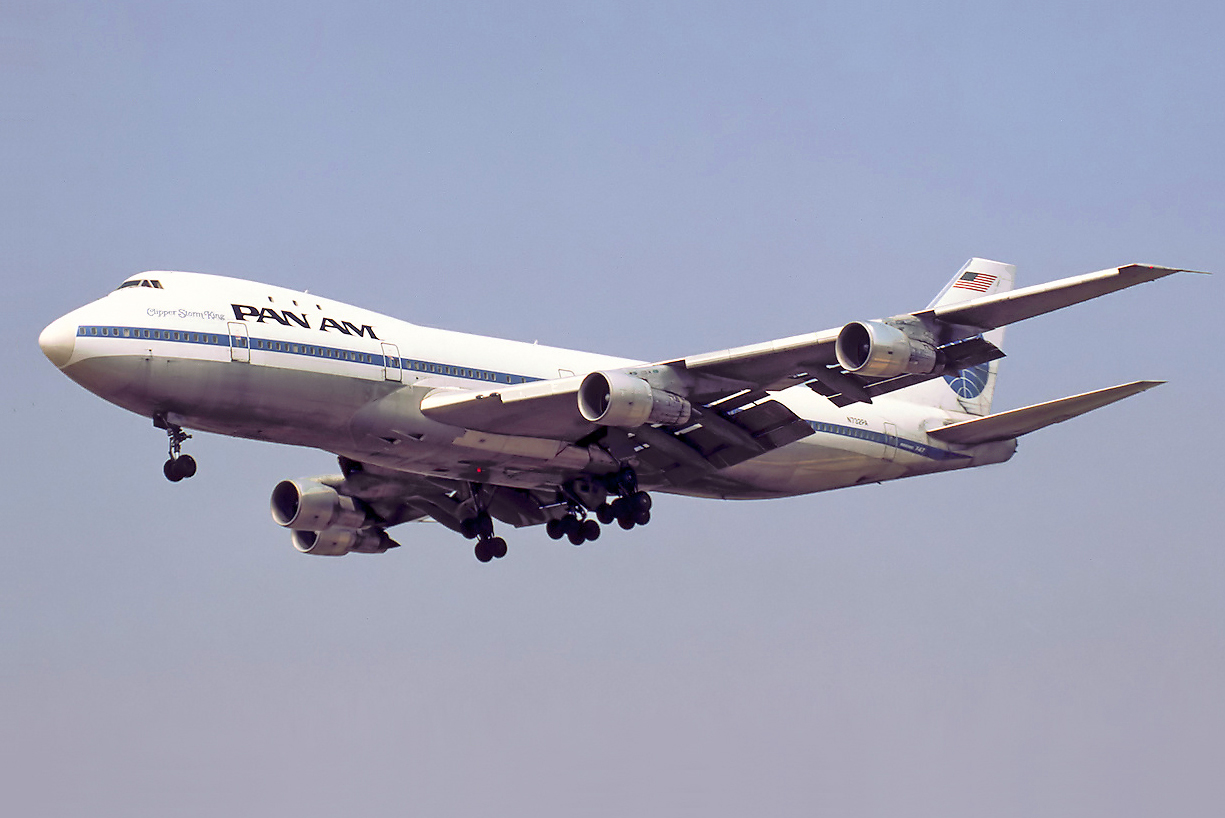
The Boeing 747, the first widebody jet airliner

The 1970s jet airliners introduced wide-body (twin-aisle) craft and high-bypass turbofan engines. Pan Am and Boeing "again opened a new era in commercial aviation" when the first Boeing 747 entered service in January 1970, marking the debut of the high-bypass turbofan which lowered operating costs, and the initial models which could seat up to 400 passengers earned it the nickname "Jumbo Jet". The Boeing 747 revolutionized air travel by making commercial air travel more affordable as ticket prices fell and airlines improved their pricing practices. Other wide-body designs included the McDonnell Douglas DC-10 and Lockheed L-1011 TriStar trijets, smaller than the Boeing 747 but capable of flying similar long-range routes from airports with shorter runways. There was also the market debut of the European consortium Airbus, whose first aircraft was the twinjet Airbus A300.

=== 1980s ===
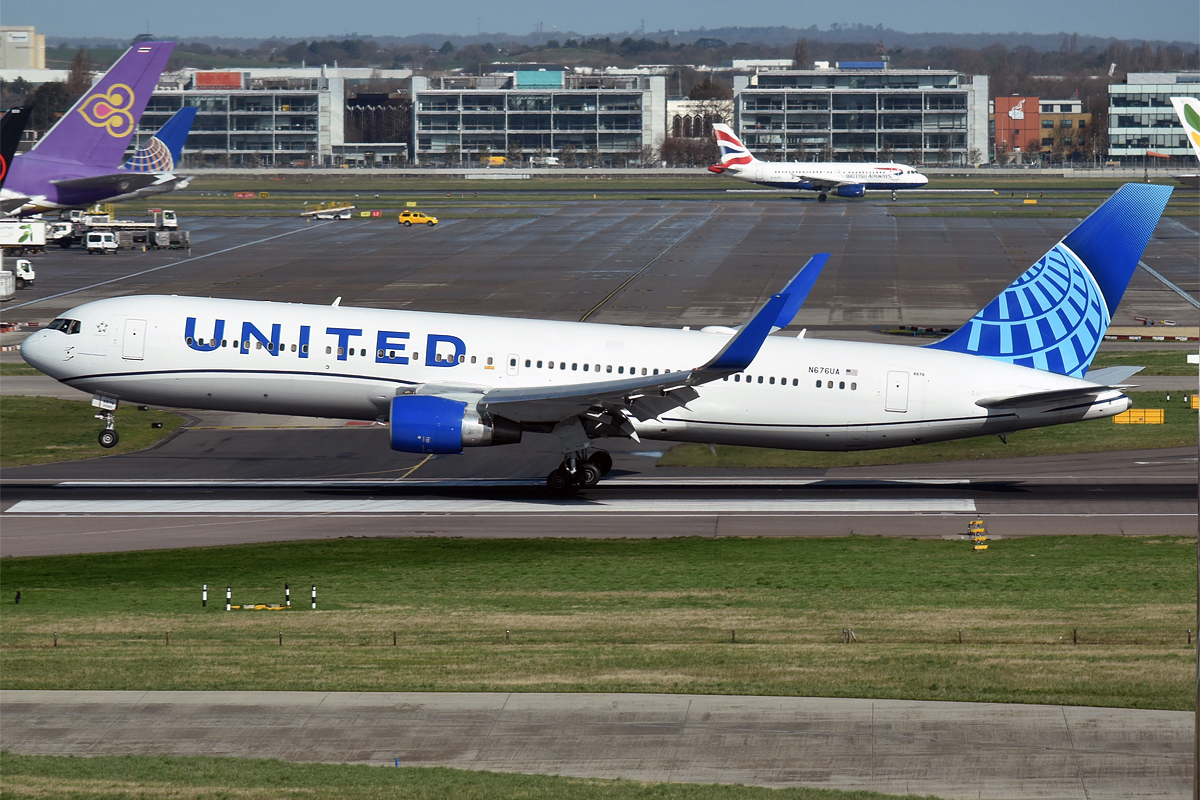
The Boeing 767, designed to compete with the Airbus A300

In 1978, Boeing unveiled the twin-engine Boeing 757 to replace its 727, and the wide body twin-engine 767 to challenge the Airbus A300. The mid-size 757 and 767 launched to market success, due in part to 1980s extended-range twin-engine operational performance standards (ETOPS) regulations governing transoceanic twinjet operations. These regulations allowed twin-engine airliners to make ocean crossings at up to three hours' distance from emergency diversionary airports. Under ETOPS rules, airlines began operating the 767 on long-distance overseas routes that did not require the capacity of larger airliners.

=== 1990s ===
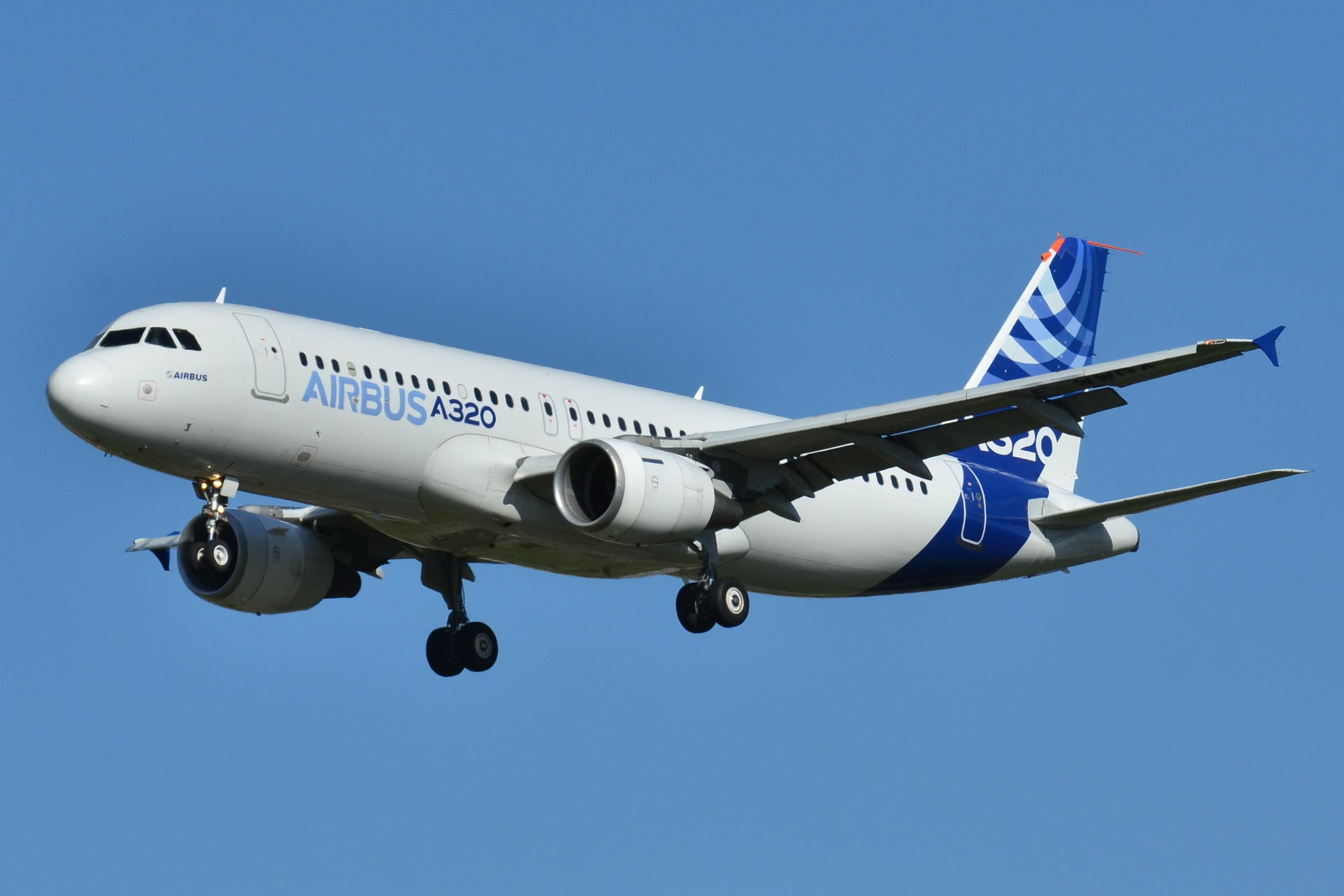
The Airbus A320 is the first fly-by-wire jetliner

By the late 1980s, DC-10 and L-1011 models were approaching retirement age, prompting manufacturers to develop replacement designs. McDonnell Douglas started working on the MD-11, a stretched and upgraded successor of the DC-10. Airbus, thanks to the success of its A320 family, developed the medium-range A330 twinjet and the related long-range A340 quad-jet. In 1988, Boeing began developing what would be the 777 twinjet, using the twin-engine configuration given past design successes, projected engine developments, and reduced-cost benefits. In addition, Boeing also released a major update on their 747, the 747-400.

== Present day ==
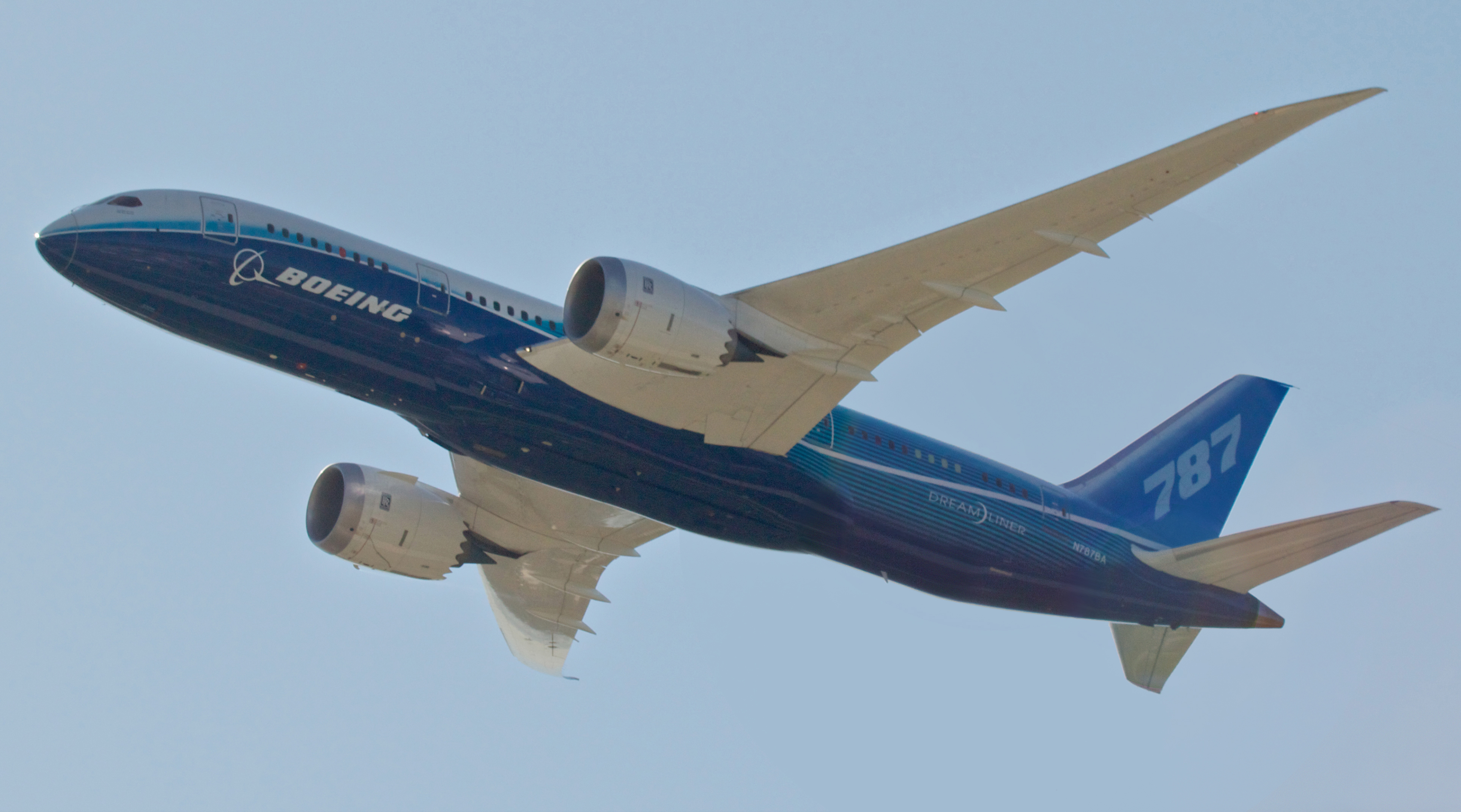
The Boeing 787, the first mainly composite jetliner

The most modern airliners are characterized by increased use of composite materials, high-bypass ratio turbofan engines, and more advanced digital flight systems. Examples of the latest widebody airliners are the Airbus A380 (first flight in 2005), Boeing 787 (first flight in 2009) and Airbus A350 (first flight in 2013). These improvements allowed longer ranges and lower cost of transportation per passenger. Sukhoi Superjet 100 and Airbus A220 (formerly Bombardier CSeries) are examples of narrowbodies with similar level of technological advancements.

The A380 was discontinued in 2019 and the last plane was delivered to Emirates in 2021. Airbus began designing it in the 90s with the expectation that airlines would be moving many people between large hubs with just one flight. Their focus was on building a very large plane with a conventional metal airframe and engines to supersede the Boeing 747. However, airlines started to operate more direct, point-to-point flights between smaller cities which made twin engine jets more attractive and economical to operate. For comparison, Boeing took a different approach and started development of the 787 in 2003 with a new composite frame and more fuel-efficient engines. This would prove to be the smarter choice as the lighter airframe paired with two next generation engines (Trent 1000 and GEnx) was much less costly to operate then the quad engine A380. The final blow to the A380 program came when Emirates cancelled a major order in 2018 and left Airbus without enough demand to continue production. It cancelled the program after realizing it would never recoup the €25 billon ($30 billion) spent on research and development. In all, 251 A380s were produced for and flown by 14 airlines. As of June 2023, Boeing has produced 1,054 787s for 34 airlines and has 592 unfulfilled orders.

== Timeline ==
Jet airliner deliveries timeline
| seats /row | 1950s | | | | | | | | 1960s | | | | | | | | | | 1970s | | | | | | | | | | 1980s | | | | | | | | | | 1990s | | | | | | | | | | 2000s | | | | | | | | | | 2010s | | | | | | | | | | 2020s |
| seats /row | 2 | 3 | 4 | 5 | 6 | 7 | 8 | 9 | 0 | 1 | 2 | 3 | 4 | 5 | 6 | 7 | 8 | 9 | 0 | 1 | 2 | 3 | 4 | 5 | 6 | 7 | 8 | 9 | 0 | 1 | 2 | 3 | 4 | 5 | 6 | 7 | 8 | 9 | 0 | 1 | 2 | 3 | 4 | 5 | 6 | 7 | 8 | 9 | 0 | 1 | 2 | 3 | 4 | 5 | 6 | 7 | 8 | 9 | 0 | 1 | 2 | 3 | 4 | 5 | 6 | 7 | 8 | 9 | 0 | 1 | 2 | 3 | 4 | 5 | 6 |
| 3 | | | | | | | | | | | | | | | | | | | | | | | | | | | | | | | | | | | | | | | | | | | | | | **Embraer ERJ** |
| 3 | | | | | | | | | | | | | | | | | | | | | | | | | | | | | | | | | | | | | | | | | | | | | | | | D̅o̅r̅n̅i̅e̅r̅ 3̅2̅8̅J̅E̅T̅ |
| 4 | | | | | Tupolev Tu-104 | | | | | | Tupolev Tu-124 | | | | | | | | **Tupolev Tu-134** |
| 4 | | | | | | | | | | | | | | | | | **Yakovlev Yak-40** |
| 4 | | | | | | | | | | | | | | | | | | | | | | | | | | | | | | | | | | | | | | | | | **Bombardier CRJ100/ 200** | | | | | | | | | **Bombardier CRJ700** |
| 4 | | | | | | | | | | | | | | | | | | | | | | | | | | | | | | | | | | | | | | | | | | | | | | | | | | | | | Embraer E-Jet | | | | | | | | | | | | | | Embraer; E-Jet E2 |
| seats /row | 1950s | | | | | | | | 1960s | | | | | | | | | | 1970s | | | | | | | | | | 1980s | | | | | | | | | | 1990s | | | | | | | | | | 2000s | | | | | | | | | | 2010s | | | | | | | | | | 2020s |
| seats /row | 2 | 3 | 4 | 5 | 6 | 7 | 8 | 9 | 0 | 1 | 2 | 3 | 4 | 5 | 6 | 7 | 8 | 9 | 0 | 1 | 2 | 3 | 4 | 5 | 6 | 7 | 8 | 9 | 0 | 1 | 2 | 3 | 4 | 5 | 6 | 7 | 8 | 9 | 0 | 1 | 2 | 3 | 4 | 5 | 6 | 7 | 8 | 9 | 0 | 1 | 2 | 3 | 4 | 5 | 6 | 7 | 8 | 9 | 0 | 1 | 2 | 3 | 4 | 5 | 6 | 7 | 8 | 9 | 0 | 1 | 2 | 3 | 4 | 5 | 6 |
| 5 | de Havilland Comet |
| 5 | | | | | | | | **Sud Aviation Caravelle** |
| 5 | | | | | | | | | Convair; 880/ 990 |
| 5 | | | | | | | | | | | | | | **BAC One-Eleven** | | | | | | | | | | | | | | | | | | **ROMBAC 1-11** |
| 5 | | | | | | | | | | | | | | **McDonnell Douglas**; **DC-9** | | | | | | | | | | | | | | | **McDonnell Douglas**; **MD-80** | | | | | | | | | | | | | | | **MD‑90** | | | | **Boeing 717** |
| 5 | | | | | | | | | | | | | | | | | | **Fokker F28** | | | | | | | | | | | | | | | | | | | **Fokker 100****/ 70** |
| 5 | | | | | | | | | | | | | | | | | | | | | | | | | | | | | | | | B̅r̅i̅t̅i̅s̅h̅ A̅e̅r̅o̅s̅p̅a̅c̅e̅ 1̅4̅6̅ |
| 5 | | | | | | | | | | | | | | | | | | | | | | | | | | | | | | | | | | | | | | | | | | | | | | | | | | | | | | | | | | A̅n̅t̅o̅n̅o̅v̅ A̅n̅-1̅4̅8̅/ 1̅5̅8̅ |
| 5 | | | | | | | | | | | | | | | | | | | | | | | | | | | | | | | | | | | | | | | | | | | | | | | | | | | | | | | | | | | | Yakovlev SJ-100 |
| 5 | | | | | | | | | | | | | | | | | | | | | | | | | | | | | | | | | | | | | | | | | | | | | | | | | | | | | | | | | | | | | | | | **Comac C909** |
| 5 | | | | | | | | | | | | | | | | | | | | | | | | | | | | | | | | | | | | | | | | | | | | | | | | | | | | | | | | | | | | | | | | | Airbus A220 |
| 6 | | | | | | | Boeing 707/ 720 |
| 6 | | | | | | | | Douglas DC-8 |
| 6 | | | | | | | | | | | **Tupolev Tu-154** |
| 6 | | | | | | | | | | | | | **Boeing 727** |
| 6 | | | | | | | | | | | | | **Hawker Siddeley Trident** |
| 6 | | | | | | | | | | | | | **Vickers VC10** |
| 6 | | | | | | | | | | | | | | | | **Ilyushin Il-62** |
| 6 | | | | | | | | | | | | | | | | | Boeing 737 Original | | | | | | | | | | | | | | | | Boeing 737 Classic | | | | | | | | | | | | | Boeing 737 NG | | | | | | | | | | | | | | | | | | | | Boeing 737 MAX |
| 6 | | | | | | | | | | | | | | | | | | | **Yakovlev Yak-42** |
| 6 | | | | | | | | | | | | | | | | | | | | | | | | | | | | | | | Boeing 757 |
| 6 | | | | | | | | | | | | | | | | | | | | | | | | | | | | | | | | | | | | | Airbus A320 | | | | | | | | | | | | | | | | | | | | | | | | | | | | Airbus A320neo |
| 6 | | | | | | | | | | | | | | | | | | | | | | | | | | | | | | | | | | | | | | | | | | | | | Tupolev Tu-204/ 214 |
| 6 | | | | | | | | | | | | | | | | | | | | | | | | | | | | | | | | | | | | | | | | | | | | | | | | | | | | | | | | | | | | | | | | | | | | | | | | Comac C919 |
| seats /row | 1950s | | | | | | | | 1960s | | | | | | | | | | 1970s | | | | | | | | | | 1980s | | | | | | | | | | 1990s | | | | | | | | | | 2000s | | | | | | | | | | 2010s | | | | | | | | | | 2020s |
| seats /row | 2 | 3 | 4 | 5 | 6 | 7 | 8 | 9 | 0 | 1 | 2 | 3 | 4 | 5 | 6 | 7 | 8 | 9 | 0 | 1 | 2 | 3 | 4 | 5 | 6 | 7 | 8 | 9 | 0 | 1 | 2 | 3 | 4 | 5 | 6 | 7 | 8 | 9 | 0 | 1 | 2 | 3 | 4 | 5 | 6 | 7 | 8 | 9 | 0 | 1 | 2 | 3 | 4 | 5 | 6 | 7 | 8 | 9 | 0 | 1 | 2 | 3 | 4 | 5 | 6 | 7 | 8 | 9 | 0 | 1 | 2 | 3 | 4 | 5 | 6 |
| 7 | | | | | | | | | | | | | | | | | | | | | | | | | | | | | | | Boeing 767 |
| 8 | | | | | | | | | | | | | | | | | | | | | | | Airbus A300/ 310 |
| 8 | | | | | | | | | | | | | | | | | | | | | | | | | | | | | | | | | | | | | | | | | | Airbus A340 |
| 8 | | | | | | | | | | | | | | | | | | | | | | | | | | | | | | | | | | | | | | | | | | | Airbus A330 | | | | | | | | | | | | | | | | | | | | | | | | Airbus A330neo |
| 8/9 | | | | | | | | | | | | | | | | | | | | | | | | | | | | | | | | | | | | | | | | | | | | | | | | | | | | | | | | | | Boeing 787 |
| 9 | | | | | | | | | | | | | | | | | | | | McDonnell Douglas DC-10 | | | | | | | | | | | | | | | | | | | MD-11 |
| 9 | | | | | | | | | | | | | | | | | | | | | Lockheed L-1011 |
| 9 | | | | | | | | | | | | | | | | | | | | | | | | | | | | | Ilyushin Il-86 | | | | | | | | | | | | Ilyushin Il-96 |
| 9 | | | | | | | | | | | | | | | | | | | | | | | | | | | | | | | | | | | | | | | | | | | | | | | | | | | | | | | | | | | | | | | Airbus A350 |
| 9/10 | | | | | | | | | | | | | | | | | | | | | | | | | | | | | | | | | | | | | | | | | | | | Boeing 777 |
| 10 | | | | | | | | | | | | | | | | | | | Boeing 747/ 747SP | | | | | | | | | | | | | | | | | | | Boeing 747-400 | | | | | | | | | | | | | | | | | | | | | | Boeing 747-8 |
| 10 | | | | | | | | | | | | | | | | | | | | | | | | | | | | | | | | | | | | | | | | | | | | | | | | | | | | | | | | Airbus A380 |
| = Twinjet | | | | | | | | | | = Trijet | | | | | | | | | | = Quadjet | | | | | | | | | | O̅v̅e̅r̅l̅i̅n̅e̅ = h̅i̅g̅h̅ w̅i̅n̅g̅ | | | | | | | | | | italics = buried engines | | | | | | | | | | **bold =** **rear engines** | | | | | | | | | | none = underwing engines |
| = Airbus | | | | | | | | | | = Boeing | | | | | | | | | | = Comac | | | | | | | | | | = Douglas | | | | | | | | | | = Embraer | | | | | | | | | | = British | | | | | | | | | | = Russian |

== See also ==
- Airliner
- Aviation
- Business jet
- Commercial aviation
- Freight aircraft
- International flight
- Jet aircraft
- Wide-body aircraft
- List of jet airliners
