= Comac C929 =

Chinese widebody passenger aircraft

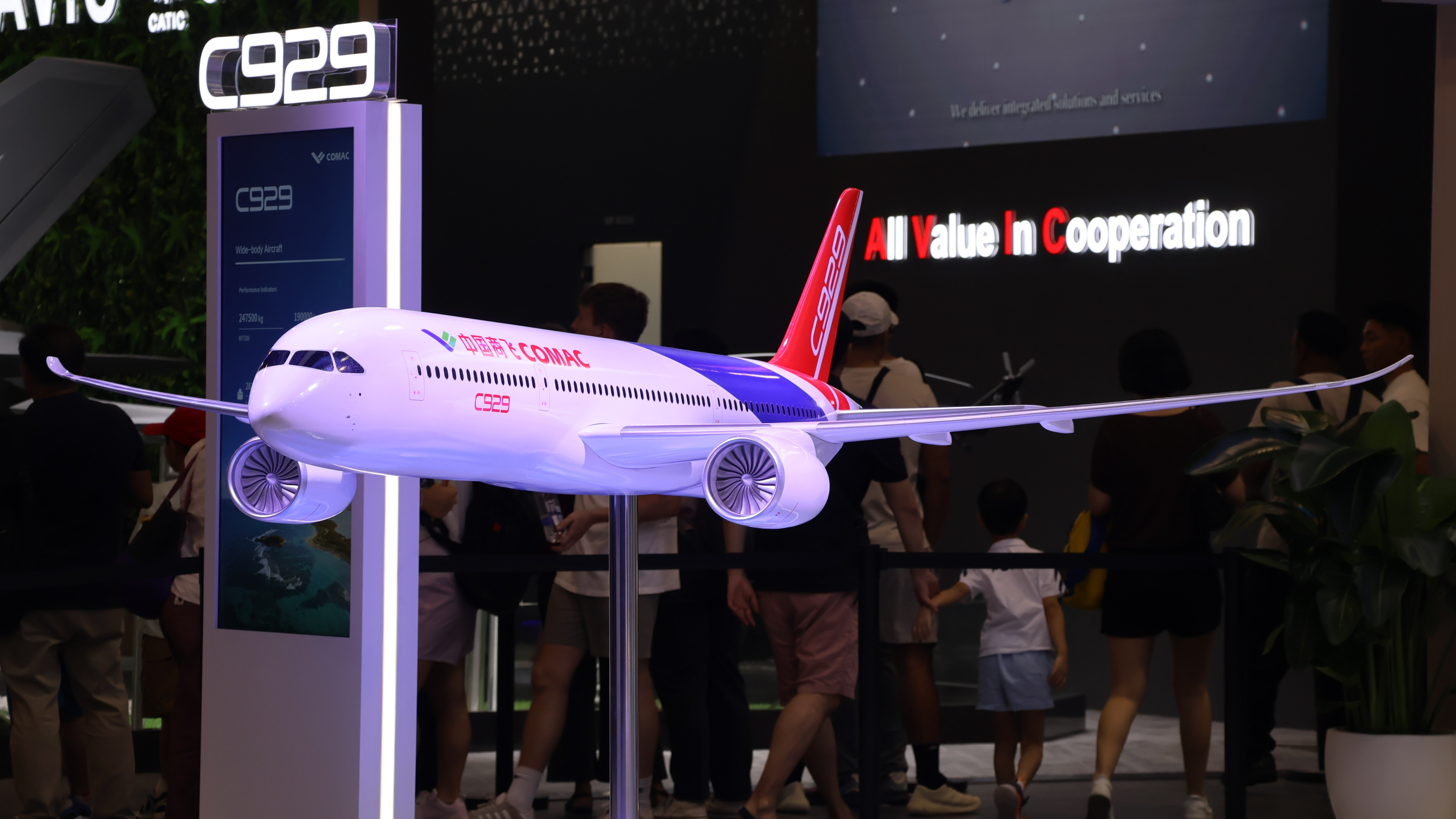
- Model of a C929 at the 2026 Singapore Airshow

General information
- Type: Wide-body jet airliner
- National origin: China
- Manufacturer: Comac
- Status: In design

The Comac C929 is a long-range 250-to-320-seat wide-body twinjet airliner being developed by China's state-owned aircraft manufacturer Comac as a competitor to the Airbus A330neo and Boeing 787 Dreamliner.

The program was previously developed by CRAIC (China-Russia Commercial Aircraft International Corporation), a joint venture between Comac and the Russian United Aircraft Corporation (UAC), as the CRAIC CR929. In 2023, following tensions between the partners and uncertainties associated with the international sanctions on Russia, Comac continued the program independently of UAC.

== Development ==
In June 2011, it was reported that Comac was studying the 290-seat C929 and 390-seat C939 wide-body aircraft. In June 2012, Russia and China entered talks to set up a joint venture between UAC and Comac to develop a successor to the Il-96. Development was expected to take at least seven years and at a cost of $7–12 billion, with a production target of several hundred aircraft. Russia would contribute its knowledge and China would provide the resources.

In May 2014, a memorandum on cooperation was reached and a feasibility study completed in autumn 2014. UAC estimated that wide-body demand worldwide through 2033 amounts to 8,000 aircraft, including 1,000 in China. Preliminary design began in February 2015. In June 2016, an agreement was signed to set up a 50–50 joint venture. In November 2016, at Zhuhai Airshow, Comac and UAC approached Honeywell and United Technologies as potential suppliers. A mock-up was exhibited at the show.

=== CRAIC joint venture ===
The China–Russia Commercial Aircraft International Corporation Limited (CRAIC) 50–50 joint venture was launched on May 22, 2017 in Shanghai, targeting a 2025–2028 maiden flight and first delivery.

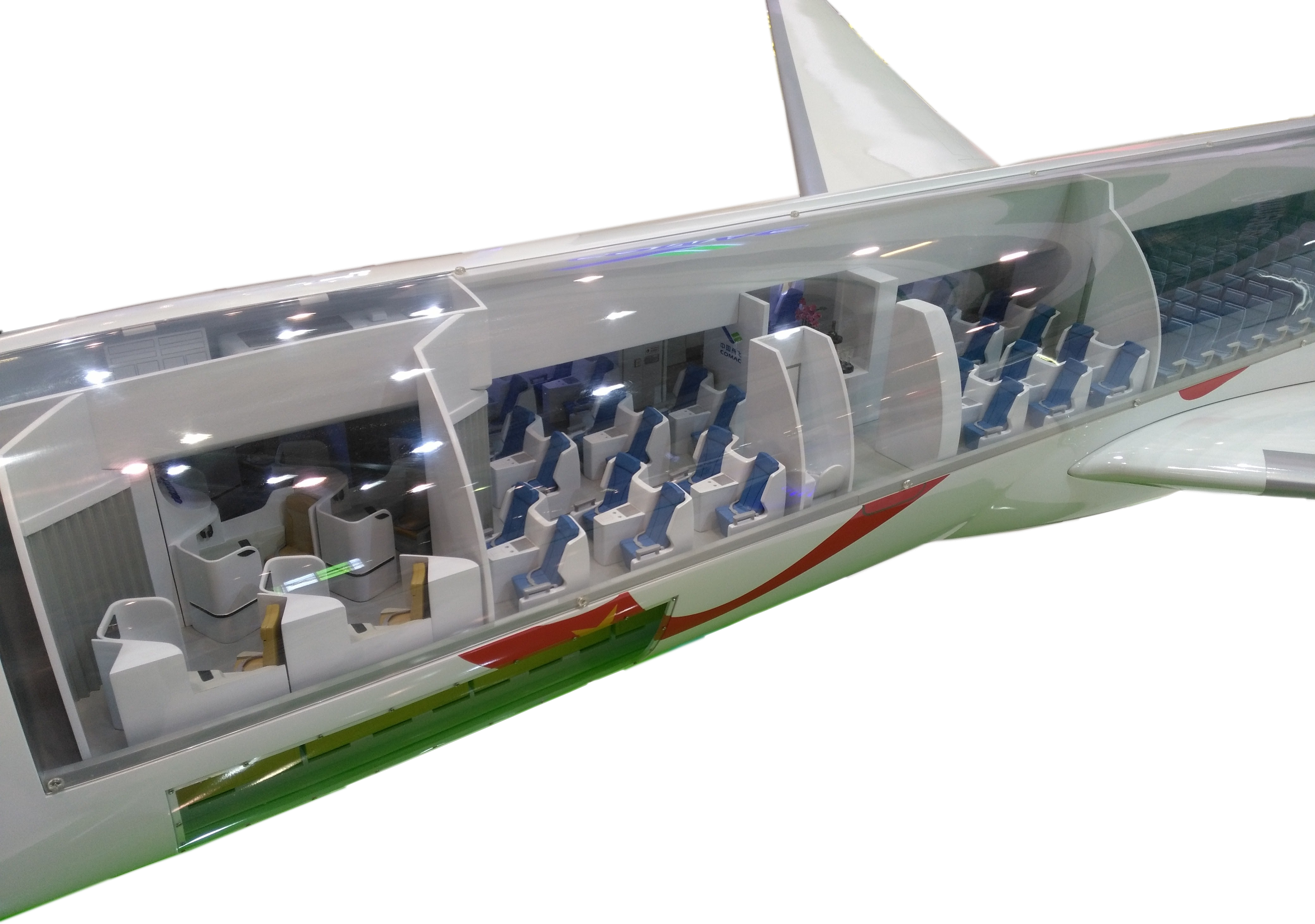
Seating : 1–2–1 in First, 2–2–2 in Business and 3–3–3 in Economy

China saw the joint venture involving joint financial investments, rather than as an intellectual property sale, as Russia wanted with the research and development center in Moscow and the aircraft manufacturing in Shanghai. The main design center was in Russia, although Shanghai was to have its own design office, with half of the work each.

In September 2017, it was named CR 929 (CR standing for China–Russia). It was to be powered by a western engine at first before an indigenous power plant developed by Russia's United Engine Corporation and China's AECC, was to be certified in 2027.

=== Preliminary design ===
A request for proposal for the propulsion system, including the engine and nacelle, was issued on 21 December 2017, to be answered by 30 May 2018. On May 15 at a Shanghai conference on aeroengines, the design grew to a 63.25 m (207.5 ft) length, 45 cm (18 in) shorter than the A330-900 but still with nine-abreast economy seating, requiring 78,000 lbf (347 kN) of thrust from each engine. GE produces the 76,100 lbf (339 kN) GEnx-1B76, and Rolls-Royce the 78,129 lbf (347.54 kN) Trent 1000 TEN. CRAIC received seven proposals by the 30 May deadline. The responding engine manufacturers appeared to be Chinese AECC, General Electric, Rolls-Royce and Russian UEC, the three others were for related systems.

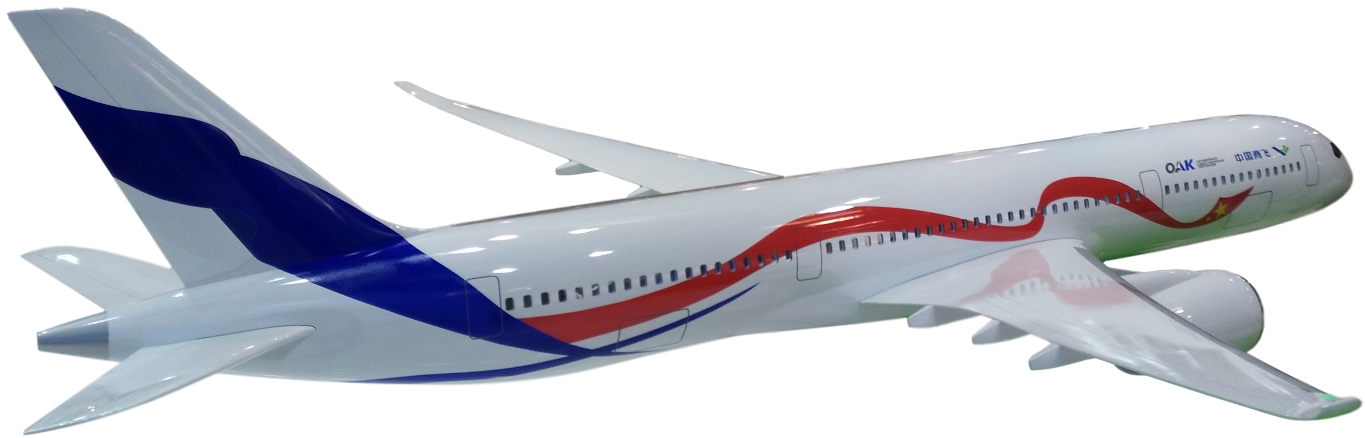
2017 mockup

The general layout and principal geometry was approved on 6 June 2018: the wing span and shape, fuselage length, nose and tail dimensions, fins sizing and form, location of engines, landing gear and doors. Within the same Gate 3, which should be completed by mid-2019, are experimental aerodynamics research, structural materials selection and technical analysis of supplied systems and equipment.

On 31 July 2018 a request for proposals for the undercarriage was issued, with expected a responses from Europe, China or Russia by the end of November 2018. The US–China trade war did not prevent bidding from UTC Aerospace Systems, which did not seek the contract and Canadian Héroux-Devtek has not received the RFP. Leonardo-Finmeccanica was negotiating to set up a joint venture with Comac and the Chinese Kangde group before the end of October 2018, to produce the fuselage central section in Zhangjiagang for $10 billion until 2040. Leonardo confirmed the joint venture on 26 October.

In November 2018, a mockup of the forward cabin was unveiled at the Zhuhai Airshow in China.

=== Prototyping ===
By December 2018, Comac produced the first composite forward fuselage prototype, a 15 by 6 m (49 by 20 ft) structure, towards joint definition in the second half of 2019. By early 2019, Concept design was targeted for the end of 2019/early 2020, before the definition phase. Definition freeze was then aimed for the first half of 2022, first flight for 2025 and certification for 2027. By spring 2019, progress was slowed by multinational cooperation challenges and engine selection was expected for September or October. High-speed wind tunnel testing was completed by December 2019 at the Moscow Central Aerohydrodynamic Institute, using a 1:39 scale model of the fuselage and wing.

=== Tensions between Comac and UAC ===
By July 2020, Irkut's chief disclosed that the first deliveries were expected to be delayed to 2028–2029, citing "difficulties" for the partners in working together.

By June 2021, China and Russia appeared to have put differences aside in relation to future market share, and confirmed plans to start building a prototype in 2021 with maiden flight in 2023. The COVID-19 pandemic impacted the development pace, however construction of the first prototype began by September 2021.

In 2022, following the Russian invasion of Ukraine, multiple sanctions brought further uncertainty to the venture. As of September 2022, the Russians remained optimistic that testing flights could begin as early as 2030.

In June 2023, news emerged that Comac intended to continue the program on its own, independently of UAC. In August 2023, UAC CEO Yury Slyusar confirmed Russia's withdrawal but expressed hope that UAC could remain involved as a supplier to the program.

=== Relaunch as Comac C929 ===
In November 2023, noting that the program was entering the detailed design stage, Comac confirmed the C929 name and the fact that the aircraft was "now being independently developed by China".

In March 2024, Comac announced that the manufacturer aimed to deliver the first fuselage section by September 2027. They said the aircraft was to have 280-400 seats and a range of about 12,000 km.

As of July 2025, American aviation journalists believe that a prototype aircraft will not be ready until 2029 at the earliest.

== Design ==
=== Seating ===
Three variants are planned: the -500 will carry 250 passengers in three classes with a range of 14,000 km (8,700 mi; 7,560 nmi), the -600 will have 280 seats and a range of 12,000 km (7,460 mi; 6,480 nmi) and the -700 will carry 320 over 10,000 km (6,214 mi; 5,400 nmi). A two class layout of the -600 would seat 291 with 243 economy seats and 48 six-abreast business seats, which can be split in eight four-abreast first class seats and 30 business for a seating of 281 in three classes. With a nine-abreast all-economy, the -600 would accommodate 405 to 440 with a seat pitch of 32 and 30 in (81 and 76 cm), respectively.

=== Cockpit ===
The two-crew flight deck looks like the Comac C919 with a five-screen EFIS and sidestick controls. Composite materials and titanium should account for half of the structural weight.

=== Engine ===
==== The starting point ====
In the 2010s, it was generally thought that a competitive widebody would initially need Western or Russian powerplants and onboard systems. The aircraft would need a 77,000–88,000 lbf (340–390 kN) thrust turbofan. Before the advent of US sanctions on Chinese technology companies, the engine was likely to be supplied by Rolls-Royce or General Electric, who already had products in this class. CRAIC expected a TSFC better by at least 10% in 2019.

==== A potential Russian engine ====
At the November 2014 Zhuhai Airshow, a high-thrust joint turbofan was discussed between Chinese Avic Commercial Aircraft Engines and the Russian United Engine Corporation (UEC), with parameters defined in early 2015 for an introduction between 2025 and 2030. In September 2017, a memorandum of understanding was signed between Rostec's UEC and Aero Engine Corporation of China: initially joint research and customer requirements were to be analysed and defined, then engine design and operating parameters were to be determined; testing was to be carried out in 2022 and certification in 2027.

The plan was to develop a more powerful version of the Aviadvigatel PD-14 engine, developed for the Yakovlev MC-21 airliner, after its certification in 2017, with a 50% scaled up core. In May 2016 the development of a 35 tf (77,000 lbf) Russian engine Aviadvigatel PD-35 began for the twinjet airliner; it was then expected to enter service in 2025 (since delayed to 2029). A derivative of the Kuznetsov NK-32 PD-30 powering the Tupolev Tu-160 supersonic bomber was also proposed in August 2015.

==== A Chinese alternative ====
Chinese companies also carried out work independently on the AECC CJ-2000 engine. Technically, the C929 could also use AI-38 engines co-developed by China and Ukrainian Ivchenko-Progress from the 225 kN Progress D-18T of the An-124/An-225, although the memorandum of understanding between Russian UEC and Chinese AECC made this possibility seem unlikely.

Since the Aviadvigatel PD-35 was in 2022 postponed until at least 2029, and the AECC CJ-1000A, on which the CJ-2000 is to be based, was nearing service-readiness in 2025, the final engine choice for the C929 remains open.

== Supplier summary ==
Category	Supplier	Country	Ref
Airframe	Aviation Industry Corporation of China	China	
Avionics	AVIAGE Systems (JV: GE Aerospace & AVIC)	United States & China	

== Orders ==
In November 2024, Comac announced that Air China would be the launch customer for the C929, though it did not state how many aircraft the airline would order nor the expected delivery date.

== Specifications ==
Specifications
Variants	C929-600
Capacity	258–280 (3-class seating)
Capacity	261–291 (2-class seating)
Capacity	405–440 (1-class seating)
Length	63.755 m (209.17 ft)
Wingspan	63.86 m (209.5 ft)
Height	17.9 m (58.7 ft)
Fuselage	5.92 m (19.4 ft) (width)
Fuselage	6.07 m (19.9 ft) (height)
Cabin max width	5.61 m (18.4 ft)
MTOW	245 t (540,000 lb)
Payload	48.83–50.4 t (107,700–111,100 lb)
Fuel capacity	103.7 t (229,000 lb)
Engines (x2)	TBA
Thrust (x2)	78,000 lbf (347 kN)
Cruise	Mach 0.85 (490 kn; 908 km/h; 564 mph)
Range	6,480 nmi (12,000 km; 7,460 mi)

== See also ==
- Comac C919
- Ilyushin Il-96

Aircraft of comparable role, configuration, and era

- Airbus A330neo
- Airbus A350
- Boeing 787 Dreamliner

Related lists

- List of jet airliners
- List of civil aircraft
