= List of Comac C909 operators =

The following is a list of operators of the Comac C909.

There are 210 Comac C909 aircraft in active service as of March 2026.

Legend	Notes
*	Current
*	Former
*	Orders

Airline	Country	Photo	-700	-700F	Notes	Refs
Air Cambodia	(Cambodia)		20			
Air Central	(China)			1	Executing order for 50 aircraft	
Air China	(China)		35			
Chengdu Airlines	(China)		30		Passenger launch customer Executing order for 30 aircraft	
China Eastern Airlines	(China)		31		Executing order for 35 aircraft Transferred from OTT Airlines	
China Express Airlines	(China)		13		Executing order for 50 aircraft	
China Flight General Aviation Company	(China)		2			
China Flying Dragon Aviation	(China)		1		Medical Service Jet variant launch operator	
China Southern Airlines	(China)		35		Executing order for 35 aircraft	
Colorful Guizhou Airlines	(China)		20			
Equatorial Congo Airlines	(Republic of the Congo)		3			
GallopAir	(Brunei)		12	3		
Genghis Khan Airlines	(China)		7			
Hainan Airlines	(China)		40			
Jiangxi Air	(China)		5		Executing order for 35 aircraft	
Lao Airlines	(Laos)		2		Received second aircraft in September 2025 Second international operator	
Lao Skyway	(Laos)			1		
OTT Airlines	(China)		24		Integrated into China Eastern Airlines in 2024	
Republic of Congo	(Republic of the Congo)		4			
Shandong Airlines	(China)		10			
Shanghai Airlines	(China)		5			
Tibet Airlines	(China)		10			
TransNusa	(Indonesia)		6		Executing order for 30 aircraft First international operator	
Urumqi Air	(China)		1		Executing orders for 40 aircraft	
VietJet Air	(Vietnam)		10		2 airframes B-652G and B-656E was leased from Chengdu Airlines until April 2026.	
YTO Cargo Airlines	(China)			1	Freighter launch customer	
