= Comac C919 =

Chinese medium-range narrowbody airliner

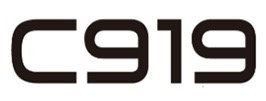

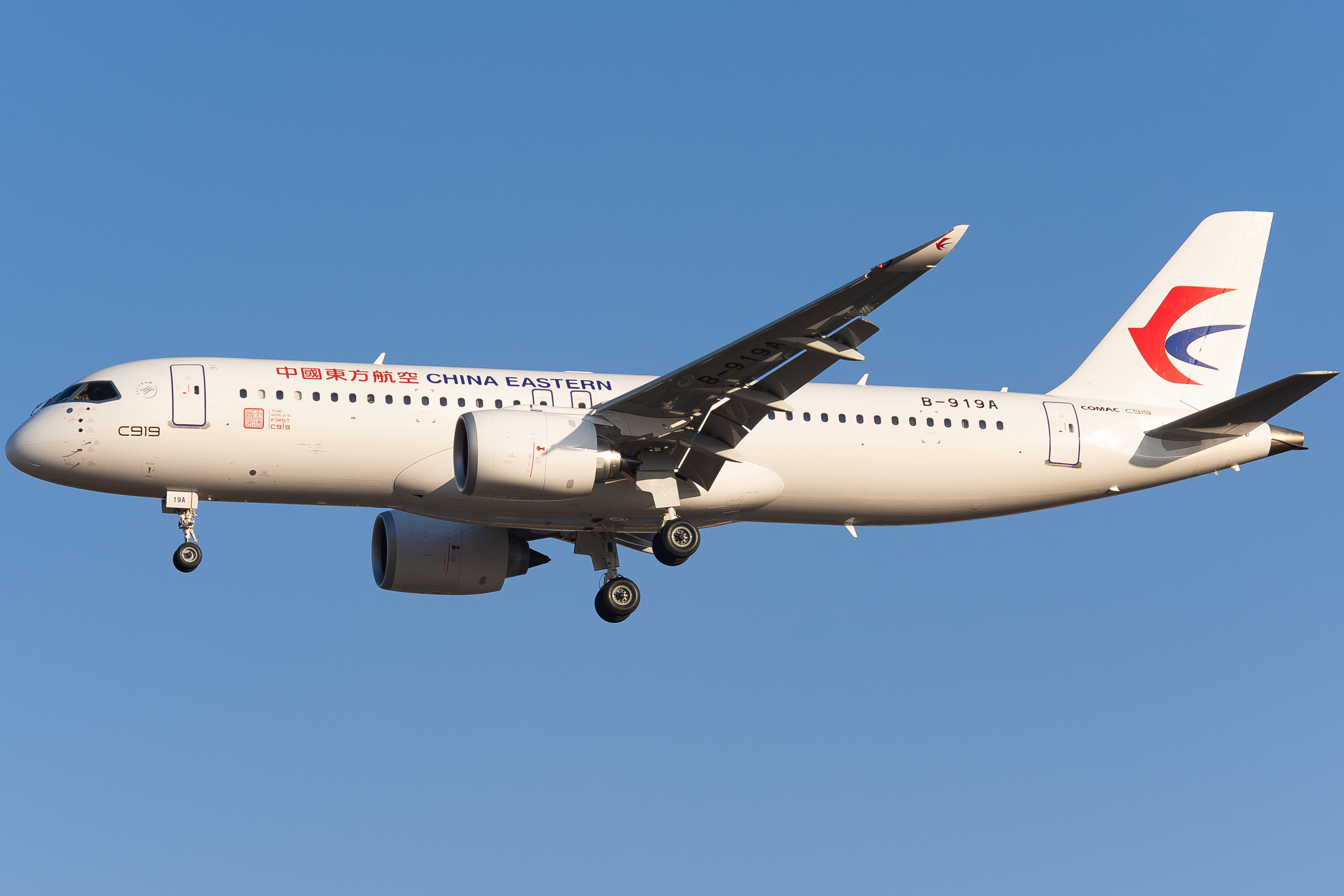
- C919 STD of China Eastern, the type's largest operator

General information
- Type: Narrow-body jet airliner
- National origin: China
- Manufacturer: Comac
- Designer: Wu Guanghui
- Status: In service
- Primary users: China Eastern Airlines: Air China; China Southern Airlines
- Number built: 50 (including 8 prototypes)

History
- Manufactured: 2015–present
- Introduction date: 28 May 2023 with China Eastern Airlines
- First flight: 5 May 2017; 9 years ago
- Initiated: 2008; 18 years ago
- In service: 2023–present

The Comac C919 is a narrow-body airliner developed by Chinese state owned aircraft manufacturer Comac. The development program was launched in 2008 as a competitor to the Airbus A320 and Boeing 737. Production began in December 2011, with the first prototype being rolled out on 2 November 2015; the maiden flight took place on 5 May 2017. On 29 September 2022 the C919 received its CAAC type certificate. The first production airframe was delivered to China Eastern Airlines on 9 December 2022 and was put into commercial passenger service on 28 May 2023.

The aircraft, primarily constructed with aluminium alloys, is powered by CFM International LEAP turbofan engines and carries 158 (8J + 150Y) to 168 (168Y) passengers in a normal operating configuration up to 5,555 km (3,000 nmi; 3,500 mi). In 2023, COMAC announced that it would develop both a shortened and a stretched version of the passenger jet – similar to the sub-variants offered for the competing Boeing 737 MAX and Airbus A320neo family.

== Naming ==
In the model number, the C stands for "Comac" and "China". The C also forms an "ABC" parallel situation with Airbus and Boeing. The following 9 refers to longevity as per Chinese culture and the following 19 refers to the seat capacity of 190.

== Development ==
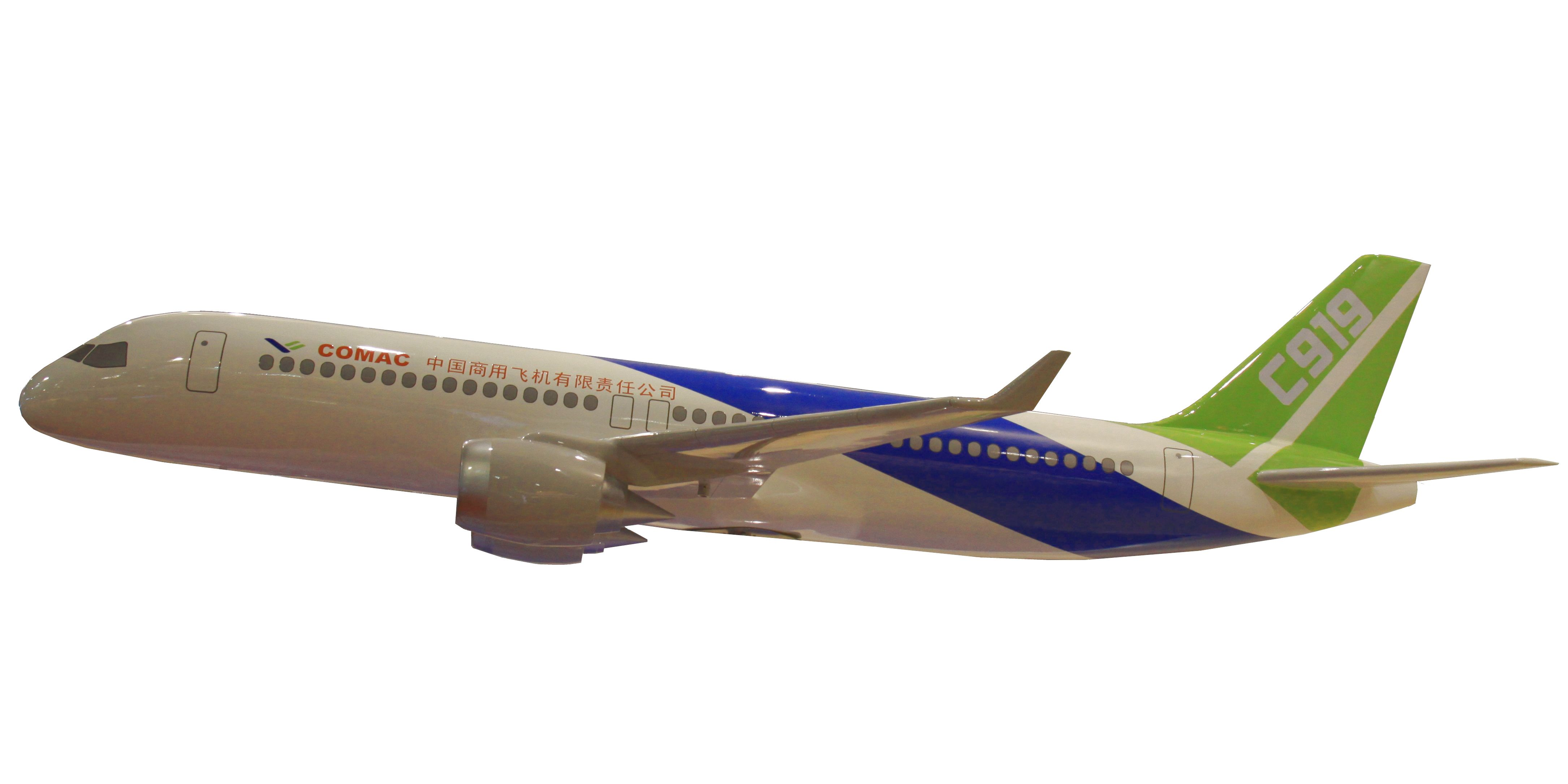
Model of the C919 from 2010.

The 2008 program launch initially targeted a maiden flight in 2014. Comac applied for a type certificate for the aircraft from the Civil Aviation Authority of China on 28 October 2010. At that time the company intended to manufacture up to 2,300 aircraft of the type. In June 2011, COMAC and Irish low-cost airline Ryanair signed an agreement to co-operate on the development of the C919. In 2012 Airbus' chief strategist Marwan Lahoud assumed that the aircraft would offer competition to Airbus by 2020.

=== Preliminary design ===
On 24 November 2011, Comac announced the completion of the joint definition phase, marking the end of the preliminary design phase for the C919, with estimated completion of the detailed design phase in 2012. Production of the first C919 prototype began on 9 December 2011. The C919's aerodynamics were designed with the help of the Tianhe-2 supercomputer. The annual production was targeted at 150 planes by 2020. Canada's Bombardier Aerospace started collaborating in March 2012 on supply chain services, electrical systems, human interface, cockpit, flight training, flight-test support, sales, and marketing.

=== Prototyping ===
Its announced development budget was CN¥58 billion (US$9.5 billion) but its actual cost was estimated at well over CN¥125 billion (US$20 billion). The first prototype was expected to complete final assembly in 2014 and perform its first flight in 2015; however, delivery was delayed again until 2018 due to technical difficulties and supply issues. At the November 2014 Zhuhai Airshow, it was announced that the first flight would be delayed to 2017. On 2 November 2015, Comac rolled out its first C919 aircraft.

In May 2018, the development of a composite wing completed in 2012 was revealed years after abandoning it for a metallic one, as static and damage tolerance tests were completed, verifying the structural design and strength before full-size composite wingbox tests. On 12 July, the static test aircraft simulated a 2.5g manoeuvre with a 150% ultimate load, bending the wings at the tips by nearly three metres for three seconds.

==== Espionage and reverse-engineering allegations ====
According to a report from cybersecurity firm Crowdstrike and a US Justice Department indictment, from 2010 to 2015 the Chinese cyberthreat actor Turbine Panda, linked to the Ministry of State Security's Jiangsu Bureau, penetrated a number of the C919's foreign components manufacturers including Ametek, Capstone Turbine, GE Aviation, Honeywell, Safran, and others and stole intellectual property and industrial process data with the aim of transitioning component manufacturing to Chinese companies. The report stated that the operations involved both cyber intrusion and theft as well as human intelligence operations, in most cases using a piece of code custom written for this industrial espionage operation. As of 2019, four people have been arrested in the US as a result of investigations into this economic espionage and theft of trade secrets.

In November 2022, a federal jury in Cincinnati convicted Yanjun Xu, 42, on counts of conspiracy to commit economic espionage, conspiracy to commit trade secret theft, attempted economic espionage and attempted trade secret theft. The US court found that Xu played a key role in a plot to steal trade secrets from western aerospace firms, for the purpose of helping the C919 commercial airliner program. He was sentenced to 20 years in prison.

It has been also put forward that Comac reverse-engineered some Western aircraft designs such as A320 and 737, although the extent and credibility of such claims are disputed. Former Airbus vice president Patrick Devaux stated that a newly-purchased A320 that was originally meant for commercial service was instead dismantled to be examined and the aircraft has since been known as the "ghost plane"; Airbus has not commented in order to preserve its market standing in China.

Junjie "Jeff" Zhang was stopped by customs from boarding a flight in Dallas to China in 2019 with devices containing confidential and proprietary documents, graphs and blueprints belonging to the aviation company where Zhang worked. The company based in Wichita was seeking at the time to do business with COMAC on the C919 airplane.

=== Flight testing ===
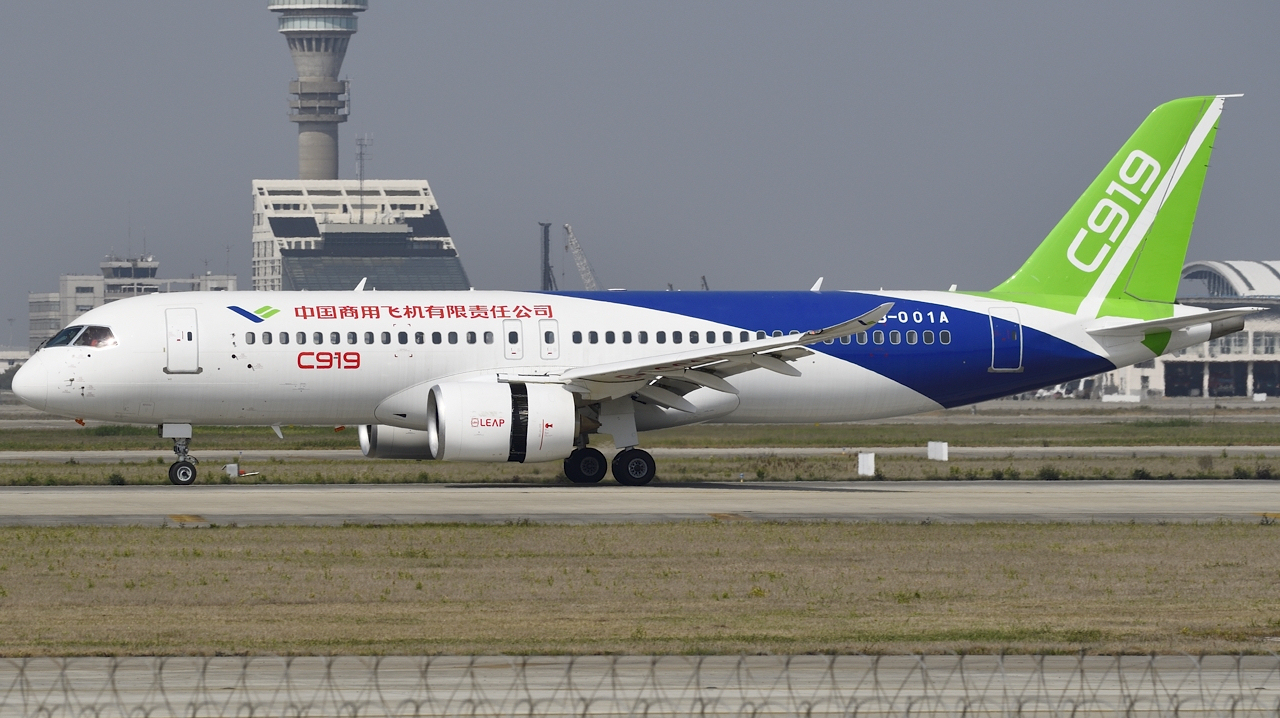
The first prototype ground tested

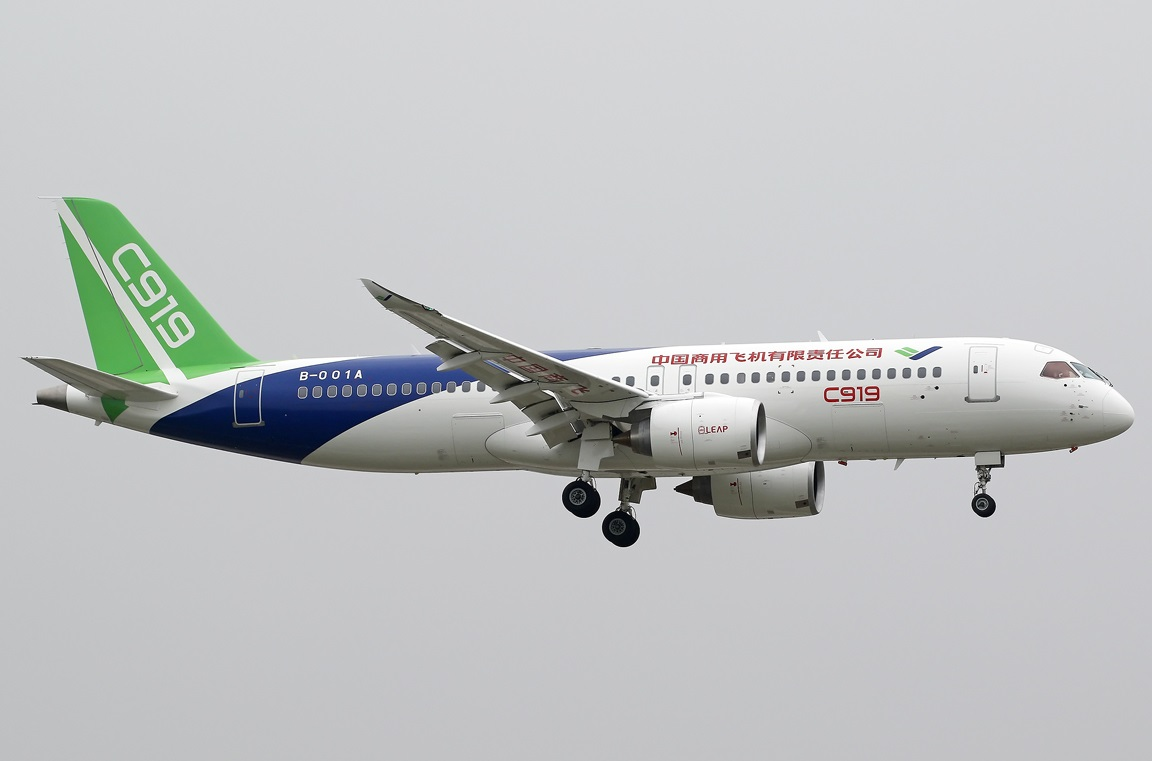
The C919 during its maiden flight on 5 May 2017

High-speed taxi tests by the first C919 prototype were completed in April 2017 and the first flight took place on 5 May 2017. At the time, Comac had a planned test programme of 4,200 flight hours and introduction to service in 2020. It was estimated that this could be delayed into 2021. The European Aviation Safety Agency was meant to validate the Chinese type certificate. The 4,200 hours of testing planned were higher than the 3,000 hours typically required for the Airbus or Boeing narrowbodies, but lower than the 5,000 hours needed for the ARJ21 (now the Comac C909).

Comac had its second prototype ready on 28 July 2017, aiming to fly it within the year for engine, APU, fuel system and extreme weather tests. The flight-test plan included six aircraft. On 28 September, it made its second flight at 10,000 ft (3,000 m), which lasted 2 hours 46 minutes, although it was supposed to last one more hour. The five-month delay between first and second flights, while the second prototype was being ground-tested, was extraordinary: in 2013 the Airbus A350 flew again after five days and in 2015 the troubled Mitsubishi MRJ flew again after eight days.

On 3 November, it made its third flight in 3h 45min, reaching 3,000 m (9,800 ft). It was transferred on 10 November from Shanghai to Xi'an to continue its flight test program, a 2h 24min, 1,300 km (700 nmi; 810 mi) flight reaching 7,800 m (25,600 ft) and Mach 0.74 (823 km/h; 444 kn).

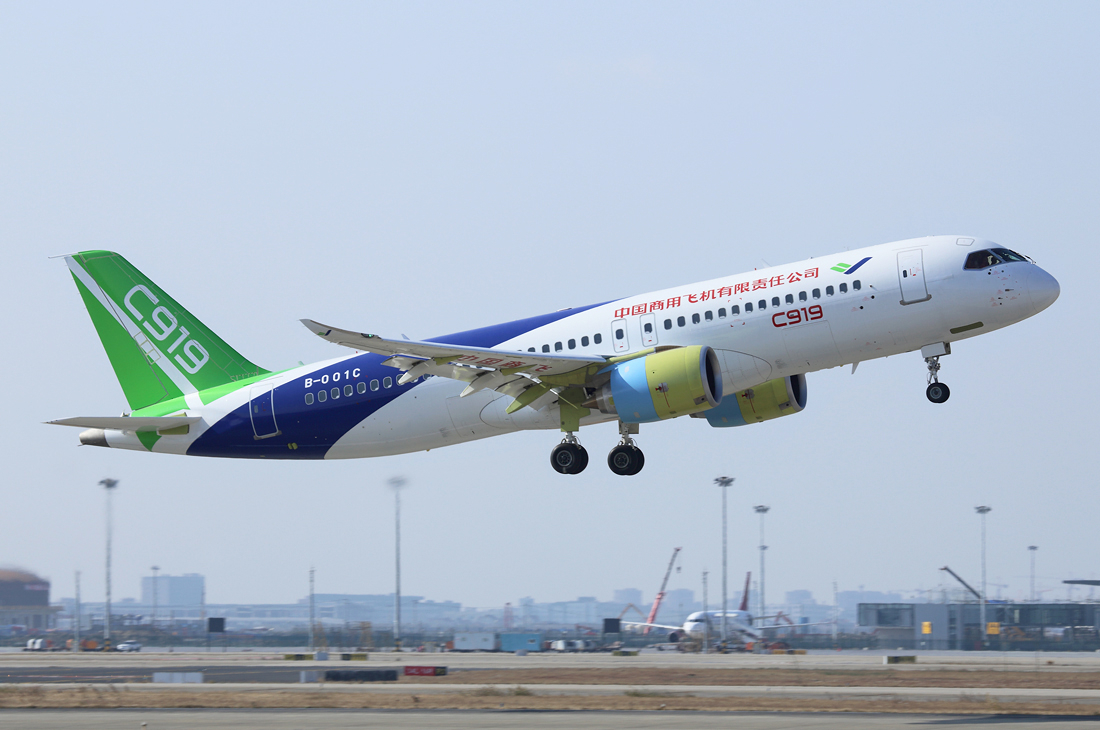
The second prototype first flight on 17 December 2017

The second prototype made its first flight on 17 December 2017. The flight test program allocated the first three prototypes for aircraft performance and engine and power systems testing, the fourth prototype for avionics and electrical system, and the fifth and sixth prototypes for passenger facilities, including the cabin and information system.

The delay between first and subsequent flights underlined the program immaturity by maiden flight: flying early at low speed and altitude is possible but faster and higher is limited by aeroelastic flutter needing ground vibration testing and aircraft instrumentation which were not ready in May. Due to flight testing problems, the 2020 introduction previously scheduled was delayed to 2021, for China Eastern Airlines. In February 2018, the first prototype was flying more than once a week.

In June 2018, Aviation Week reported flight-test aircraft grounding for modifications, extending the schedule by three months but maintaining a 2020 certification target. The two prototypes needed their flaps and tailplanes modified, due to delamination of the carbon-fiber reinforced plastic elevators. The third test aircraft was also being modified and maximum-rate pressurization was tested. As three other planes were available in 2019, Comac maintained first deliveries for 2021.

Comac denied any grounding and highlighted that modifications were part of the flight test process, stating the two first aircraft were flying stability tests and checking systems. The first was calibrated and had its counterweight and trailing cone systems modified while the second had its functions and systems checked. The third was in final assembly with its wing and fuselage joined, cables and systems were being installed for a first flight target by the end of the year. On 12 July, the second prototype flew from Shanghai-Pudong to Dongying Airport in 1h 46min to allow for various meteorological conditions testing. In September, Comac expected to conduct 1,500 test flights for over 2,000 flying hours before the first delivery and planned to fly the third prototype before the end of 2018.

In October 2018, the flight-deck design was re-evaluated to comply with US FAR Part 25.1302, which is not required by CAAC but would be needed for FAA certification in order to sell the aircraft outside China. Developing a Chinese engine to replace the CFM Leap-1C would take at least another 15 years. At that time the two prototypes had flown less than 150 h, averaging less than 5 h per month each. To achieve certification in December 2020 and first delivery in 2021, the planned 4,200 h of flight tests would need 33 hours a month each if the last four prototypes are evenly spaced before year-end-2019. Newest airliner designs like the Airbus A350 needed a 2,600 hour test program, and the Mitsubishi MRJ was expected to need 3,000 h.

On 15 October 2018, ten Chinese nationals, including intelligence officials, were indicted by the US for allegedly working with COMAC to steal the secrets of thirteen foreign aerospace companies that were partnered with COMAC to build the C919.

By the end of 2018, the first prototype was to enter flutter flight tests after having completed ground tests. The third prototype made its maiden flight on 28 December for 1h 38 min.

A fourth prototype conducted its maiden flight on 1 August 2019 from Shanghai Pudong International Airport. A fifth prototype conducted its first flight on 24 October 2019, also from Shanghai airport; the fifth prototype was expected to test for extreme weather conditions, the environmental control system, drainage systems and electrical supplies. Comac rescheduled its certification target from 2020 to 2021, with the first delivery the following year.

The sixth and final prototype, intended for the flight certification program, completed its maiden flight on 27 December 2019. Reports at the time indicated that the C919 was expected to commence commercial service with China Eastern Airlines in either 2021 or 2022.

Air display at Nanchang in 2020 (0:50–1:50)

On 27 November 2020, the C919 received its type inspection authorization from the CAAC, meaning that "the aircraft design has been finalised and verified, and that no major changes can be made to its structure."

After completing cold-weather testing in China's Inner Mongolia, the C919 was slated to conduct flight tests in natural icing conditions from London International Airport in Ontario, Canada during March 2021. However, these tests may have been delayed due to the COVID-19 pandemic.

=== Entry into service ===
The C919 completed its first pre-delivery flight test at Shanghai Pudong International Airport. Comac reported that the aircraft (B-001J, MSN107) successfully completed a 3-hour test session on 14 May 2022. The aircraft, bearing the livery of China Eastern Airlines, was set to be delivered in 2022. In May 2022, the heavily modified jet was listed for a price of 653 million yuan (US$101 million), almost matching the Airbus A320neo and the Boeing 737 MAX competitors, and twice the US$50 million price initially anticipated, albeit with composite wings.

The airline flew a number of route-proving flights throughout 2022 to reinforce its viability on important segments. Many of the flights were flown between different Chinese cities. Around the same time, the first production aircraft, bound for China Eastern Airlines, started performing flight tests to ensure its preparation for commercial service. COMAC reported after the first flight that all pre-set tasks were accomplished successfully. Plans foresaw that one C919 was to be delivered to China Eastern Airlines in 2022, while the remaining four aircraft in the first batch of orders would be delivered in 2023.

The aircraft received its airworthiness certification from the Civil Aviation Administration of China on 29 September 2022 and the first operational airframe intended for commercial service was delivered to launch customer China Eastern Airlines on 9 December 2022 in Shanghai.

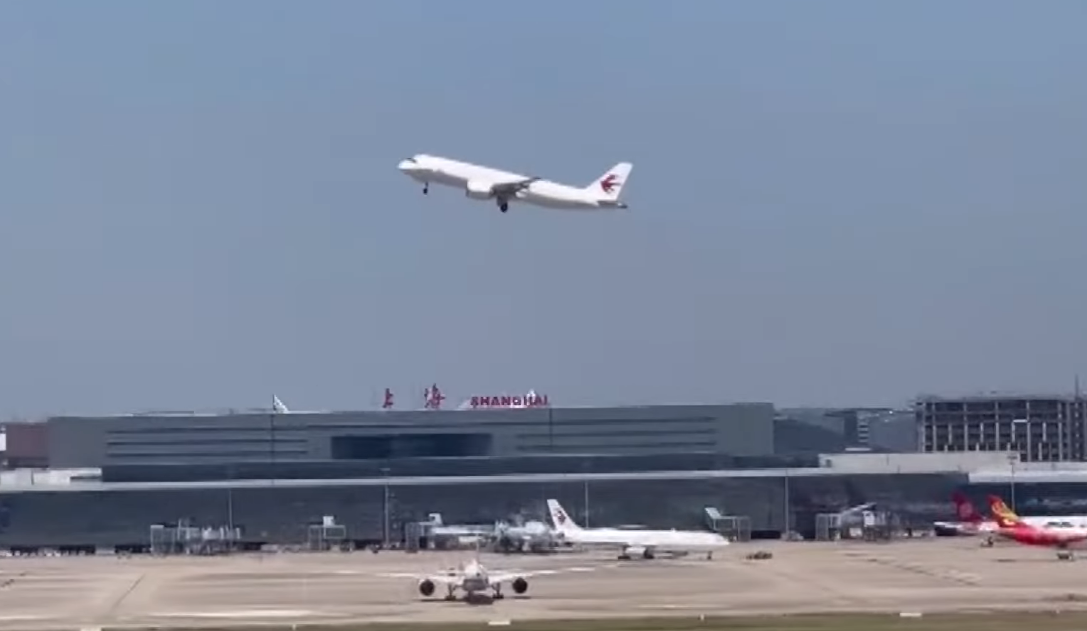
The first C919 commercial flight departed from Shanghai Hongqiao Airport on 28 May 2023

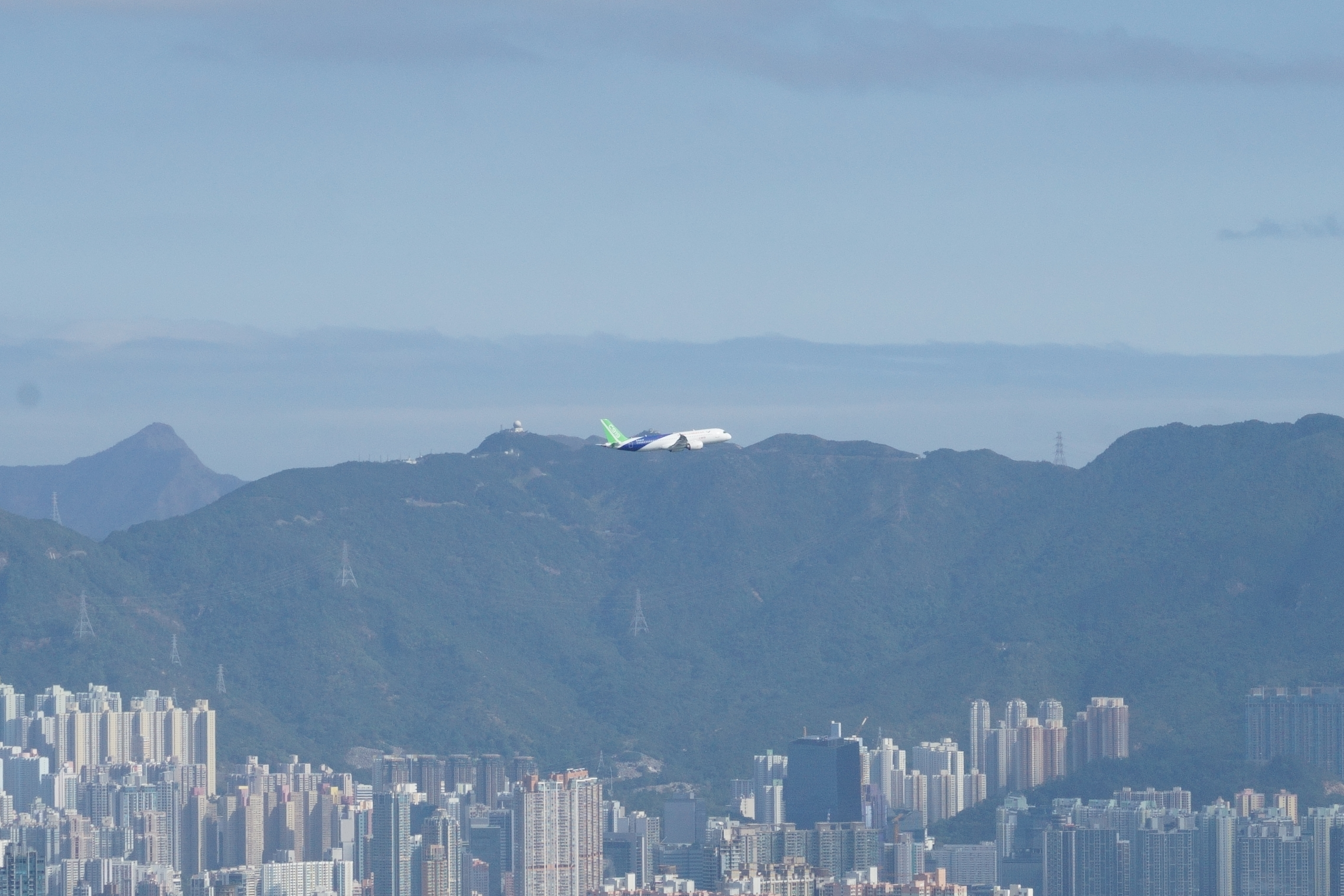
C919 flight demonstration over Victoria Harbour, Hong Kong

The C919 aircraft delivered to China Eastern Airlines continued flying short test flights for most of January 2023, with a break from 20 to 28 January for the Lunar New Year celebrations. In February 2023, China Eastern Airlines' C919 flight-test verification program was delayed due to a malfunction in the jet's CFM International LEAP-1C engine's thrust reverser. On 7 May 2023, test flights resumed after a three-month break that had grounded the entire fleet of C919s; the airline continued to plan for passenger revenue-service to commence in spring 2023.

On 28 May 2023, COMAC C919 commercial service began with China Eastern Airlines flight MU9191 departing from Shanghai Hongqiao Airport and arriving at Beijing Capital Airport.

On 29 May 2023, the C919 began routine flights MU9197 and MU9198 connecting Shanghai Hongqiao Airport and Chengdu Tianfu Airport on a daily basis.

China Eastern Airlines inducted a second C919 aircraft, registered as B-919C, with a formal reception taking place on 14 July 2023 at the flight test complex building of Zhuqiao base.

In July 2023, it was announced that Suparna Airlines, a Chinese airline owned by HNA, had signed a framework agreement with SPDB Financial Leasing valued at US$3.6 billion for leasing 30 COMAC C919 aircraft.

On 20 September 2023, Brunei's GallopAir said the C919 aircraft will undergo certification processes by Brunei's Department of Civil Aviation prior to delivery, which is forecasted to begin in the third quarter of 2024. Once certified, GallopAir would be the first operator of C919 outside of China and the first in Southeast Asia.

From 12 to 17 December 2023, the C919 and ARJ21 conducted static displays at Hong Kong International Airport for the first time outside mainland China, and the C919 conducted a flight demonstration over Victoria Harbour on the 16th.

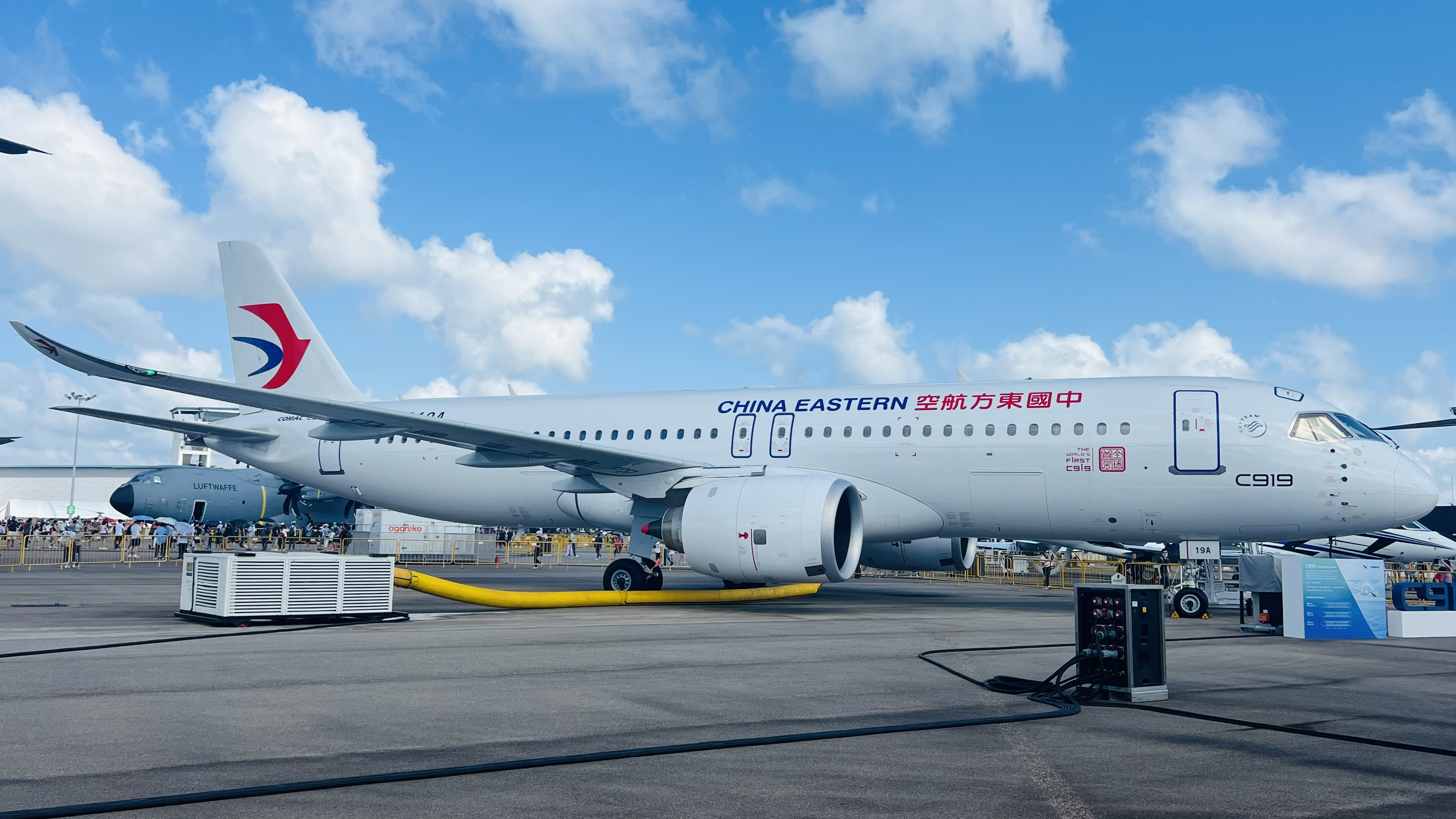
Comac C919 on static display at the Singapore Airshow.

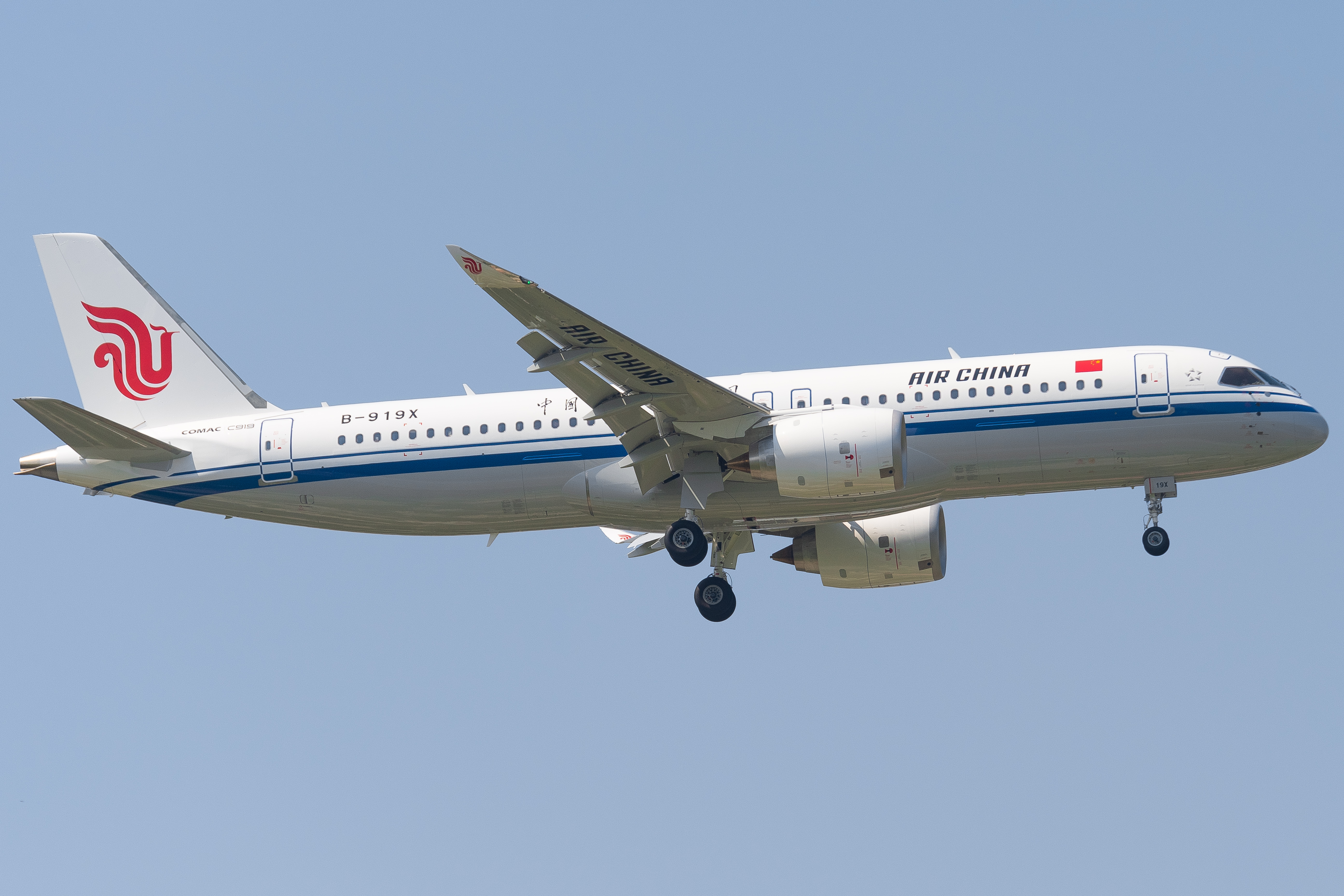
Air China took delivery of its first C919 on 29 August 2024.

The C919 aircraft made its debut outside China, staging a fly-by at the pre-show of the 2024 Singapore Airshow. Also at the airshow, Comac announced an order from Tibet Airlines for 40 C919s. The high-altitude variant ordered will have a shortened fuselage and strengthened landing gear for short-field performance.

In May 2024, about one year after the commencement of passenger revenue service, B-919A, the first delivered Comac C919 airframe, was subjected to "A-inspection" tests, a series of "deep level" safety inspections lasting four days; the parts tested included the aircraft's engines, landing gear, and cabin equipment. The inspections were conducted by China Eastern Airlines Technology, a subsidiary of the group that also owns China Eastern Airlines. The aircraft passed the battery of inspections.

The type's first commercial flight outside of mainland China occurred on 1 June 2024. A C919 operated by China Eastern Airlines was chartered to fly a group of students from Hong Kong to Shanghai for an exchange program. The first scheduled international C919 flight, from Beijing to Ulaanbaatar, Mongolia on Air China, flew on 13 August 2026.

=== Shrinking the C919 for high-altitudes: C919-600 ===
In September 2023, at the 16th Pujiang Innovation Forum in Shanghai, COMAC Chairman He Dongfeng revealed that a shortened fuselage variant of the C919 would also be built, with a typical seating of 130.

On 17 December 2023, COMAC signed a deal with Tibet Airlines to jointly develop the high-altitude version of the jet in order to serve passengers in the Tibetan-Himalayan plateau. The shortened version of the C919 is anticipated to serve routes with high-altitude landing sites, with a typical seating range of 140 to 160 passengers. It is designed to be capable of operating at all the high-plateau airports in China including the highest commercial airport in the world, Daocheng Yading Airport (ZUDC/DCY) at an altitude of 14,472 feet, which was only served by specially up-rated and modified Airbus A319-115 and A319-133 up to the middle of the 2020s.

In August 2025, it was reported that the outer wingbox of the first C919-600 (MSN 00032), the shortened fuselage version, was granted its airworthiness certificate by CAAC Shanghai certification center. It was also the first structural component of the C919-600 to receive approval.

On 8 January 2026, it was reported that the first C919-600 prototype was rolled out from the production line in Shanghai Pudong. On 21 January 2026, the first C919-600 prototype with test registration "B-002U" was spotted by photographers at COMAC's production site at Shanghai Pudong International Airport.

On 29 July 2026, the C919-600 prototype made its maiden flight, with the flight lasting 1hr 59 minutes.

=== Stretching the C919 for capacity: C919-800 ===
In September 2023, at the 16th Pujiang Innovation Forum in Shanghai, COMAC Chairman He Dongfeng revealed that a stretched fuselage version of the C919 would also be built, with a maximum seating of 240. The type is expected to enter service by 2030.

In July 2026, it is reported that COMAC has signed an agreement with China Eastern Airlines to jointly develop the stretched fuselage variant.

== International certification ==
COMAC has been working with the European Union Aviation Safety Agency (EASA) toward certification of the C919 aircraft since a bilateral aviation safety agreement came into effect in 2020. The company had initially hoped to obtain EASA certification by the end of 2025. However, according to an interview with EASA executive director Florian Guillermet in spring 2025, while the agency had been working with Comac for four years up till then, only two of those years had been productive. Guillermet expressed confidence that Comac would ultimately secure approval, but he estimated that certification would likely come between 2028 and 2031, a timeline of three to six years from 2025.

Certification by EASA has been seen as critical to the international success of the C919, as most countries require commercial aircraft to be approved by major regulators such as EASA or the U.S. Federal Aviation Administration (FAA). In April 2025, Comac was not actively pursuing FAA certification. Non-Chinese leasing companies and airlines have indicated they would require EASA or FAA validation before considering the aircraft for their fleets. EASA's Guillermet noted in 2025 that while the certification process for Western-built aircraft typically takes one to two years following its first flight, or about six months for validation under a bilateral aviation safety agreement (where one authority recognizes another's certification), such timelines generally apply to manufacturers with long-established relationships with EASA. He explained that EASA must assess the overall design and integration of the C919 before granting a type certificate and that validation tests and flight evaluations of the aircraft's design and certain components had yet to be completed in this case.

In January 2026, nine years after the first flight of the aircraft, it was reported that two test pilots from the EASA had arrived in Shanghai and conducted verification flights. Senior western pilots working for COMAC and Chinese airlines had been reportedly accompanying the EASA pilots to demonstrate the reliability of the C919-100.

== Variants ==
=== C919 ===
The C919 is the baseline variant of the C919 family, the series has two configurations: C919 STD and C919 ER. They are certified as two different weight variants (WV) under the same C919 model.

==== C919 STD ====
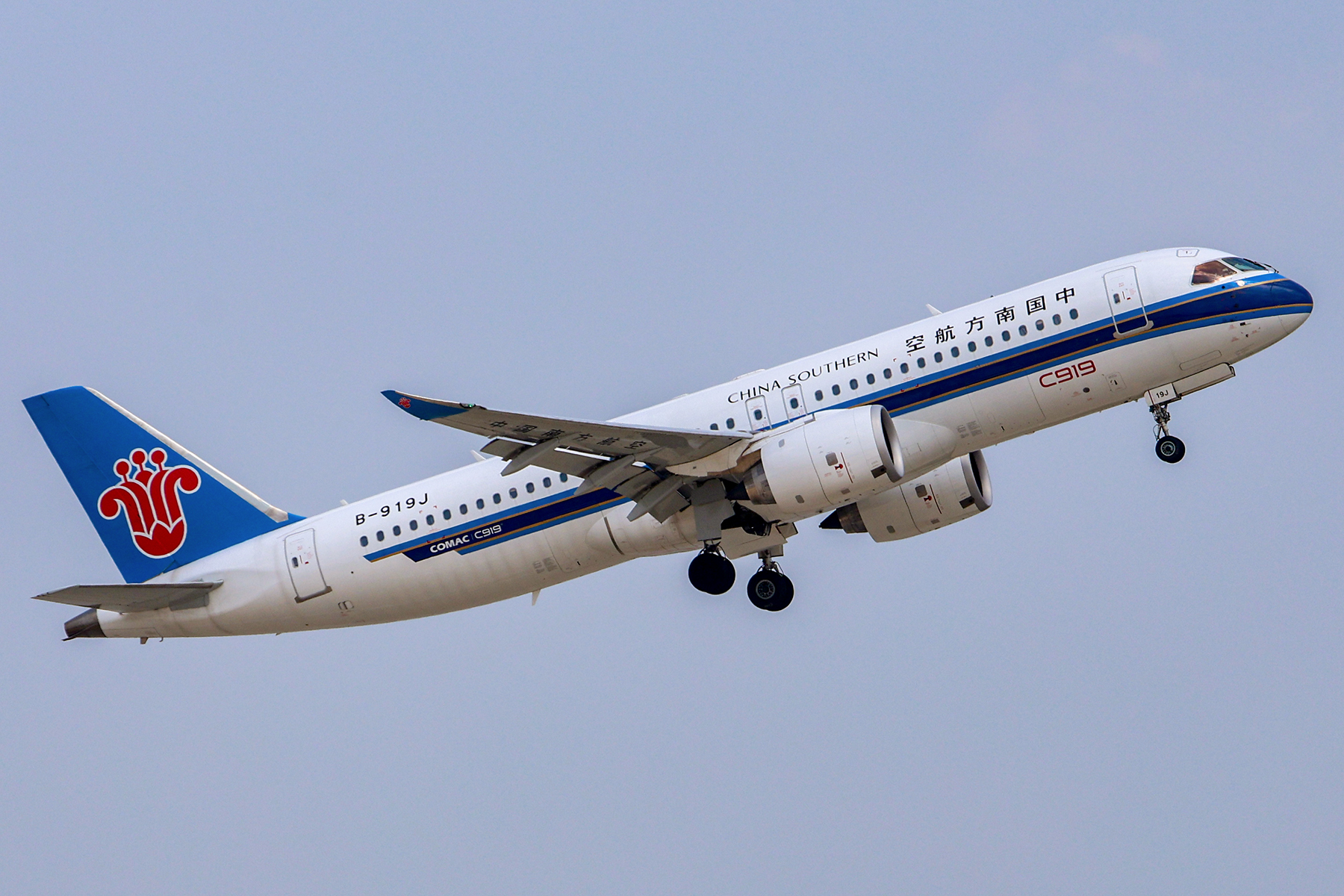
C919 STD of China Southern Airlines

The baseline variant of the C919 series is designated "C919-100 STD", STD for standard. Equipped with two CFM International LEAP-1C28 engines, each rated at 129.98 kilonewtons [kN] (29,220 lb_{f}) of maximum takeoff (MTO) thrust and 127.93 kN (28,760 lb_{f}) of maximum continuous thrust (MCT).

It is the most popular variant of the C919 series, with over 300 confirmed orders from China Eastern Airlines, China Southern Airlines and HNA Aviation.

==== C919 ER ====
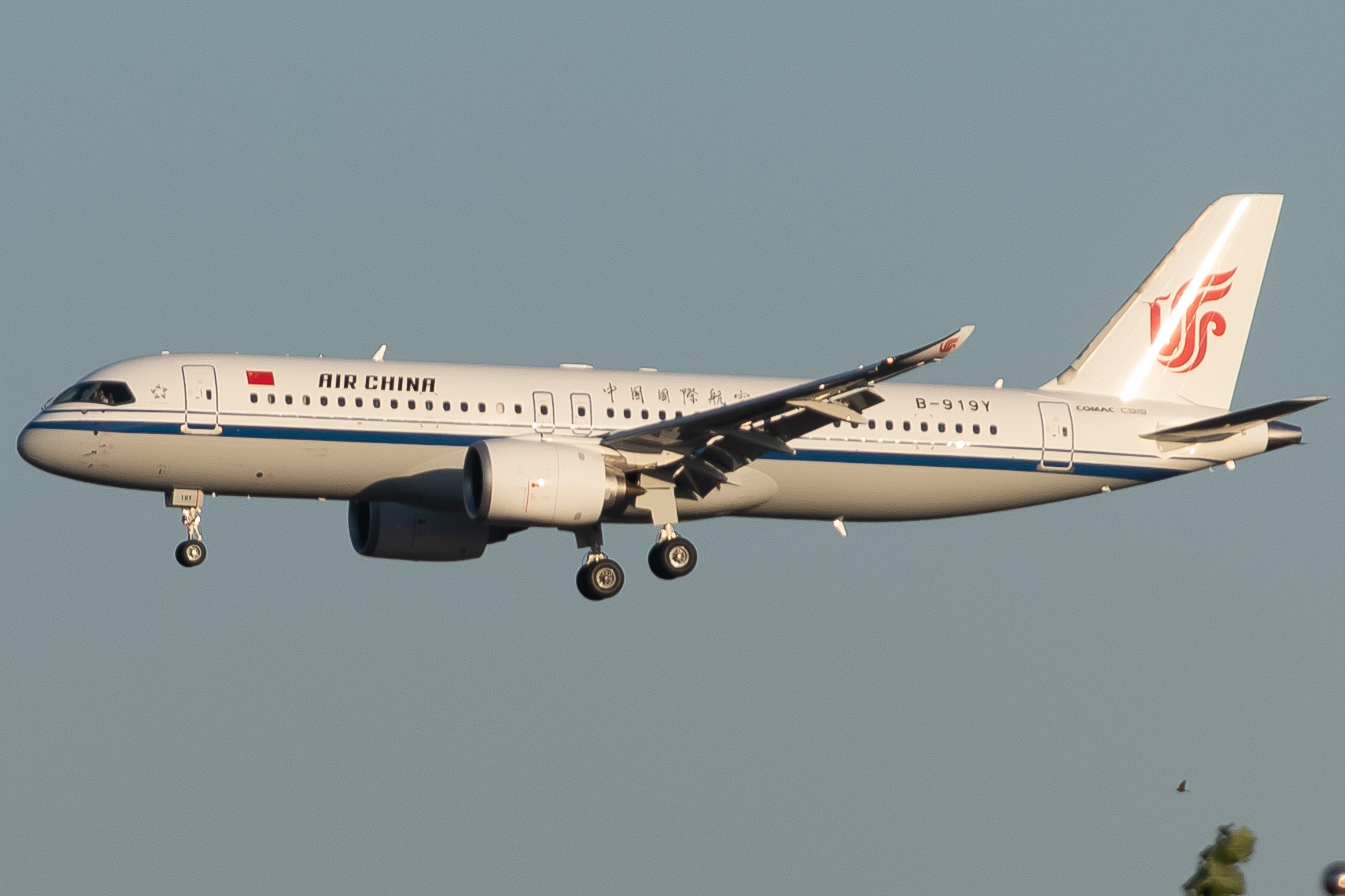
C919 ER of Air China, the type's sole operator

The extended range variant of the C919 series is designated "C919 ER". Equipped with two CFM International LEAP-1C30 or LEAP-1C30B1 engines, each rated at 137.14 kN (30,830 lb_{f}) of MTO thrust and 133.22 kN (29,950 lb_{f}) of MCT. Together with other improvements to enable a higher maximum takeoff weight (MTOW) and higher maximum taxi weight (MTW), therefore extends the payload envelope and its range capability.

Noticeably the extended range capability is enabled by higher MTOW and potential structural strengthening, no auxiliary fuel tanks are fitted, therefore it retains the same fuel capacity as the standard (STD) version.

Air China is the only confirmed C919 ER operator at the moment, with over a hundred orders in the order book.

=== C919-600 ===
Jointly developed with Tibet Airlines (later Xizang Airlines), the C919-600 is the shortened fuselage variant of the C919 family which rolled out in January 2026.

Compared to the standard C919, the -600 removed 6 frames from the body fuselage and reduced weight for better performance.

The shortened version of the C919 is anticipated to serve routes with high-altitude landing sites, with a typical seating range of 140 to 160 passengers.

It is designed to be capable of operating at all the high-plateau airports in China including the highest commercial airport in the world — Daocheng Yading Airport (ZUDC/DCY) at 14,472 feet (4,411 m), which is only served by specially up-rated and modified Airbus A319 at this time.

=== C919-800 ===
Jointly developed with China Eastern Airlines, the C919-800 is the extended fuselage variant of the C919 family which is under development and expect to enter service by 2030.

At its maximum, the extended fuselage variant would fit nearly 50 more passengers than the current variant, which can seat 156–192 people.

== Design ==
=== Configuration and performance ===
The dimensions of the C919 are quite similar to those of the Airbus A320; its fuselage is 3.96 metres (13.0 ft) wide and 4.166 metres (13.67 ft) high with a 12.915 square metres (139.02 sq ft) cross-section. This may allow for a common unit load device to be used for both aircraft. It has a 33.6 metres (110 ft) wingspan (35.4 metres (116 ft) with winglets). The aircraft's intended payload capacity will be 20.4 tonnes. The design calls for cruise at Mach 0.785 (519 mph; 451 kn; 835 km/h) with an operating ceiling of 12,200 metres (39,800 feet). There will be two variants: the standard version with a 4,075 km (2,200 nmi; 2,532 mi) range, and a 5,555 km (2,999 nmi; 3,452 mi) extended-range version. The C919 is a conservative design, deemed by analysts to be similar to the 30 year-old A320 and less efficient than the A320neo and 737 MAX.

=== Construction ===
The center wing box, outer wing box, wing panels, flaps, and ailerons are built in Xi'an, China; the center fuselage sections are built in Hongdu, China. Aluminium-lithium alloys account for 8.8% of the structure and composite materials for 12%. The air frame will be made largely of aluminium alloy. Aircraft design and assembly is performed in Shanghai.

=== Wings ===
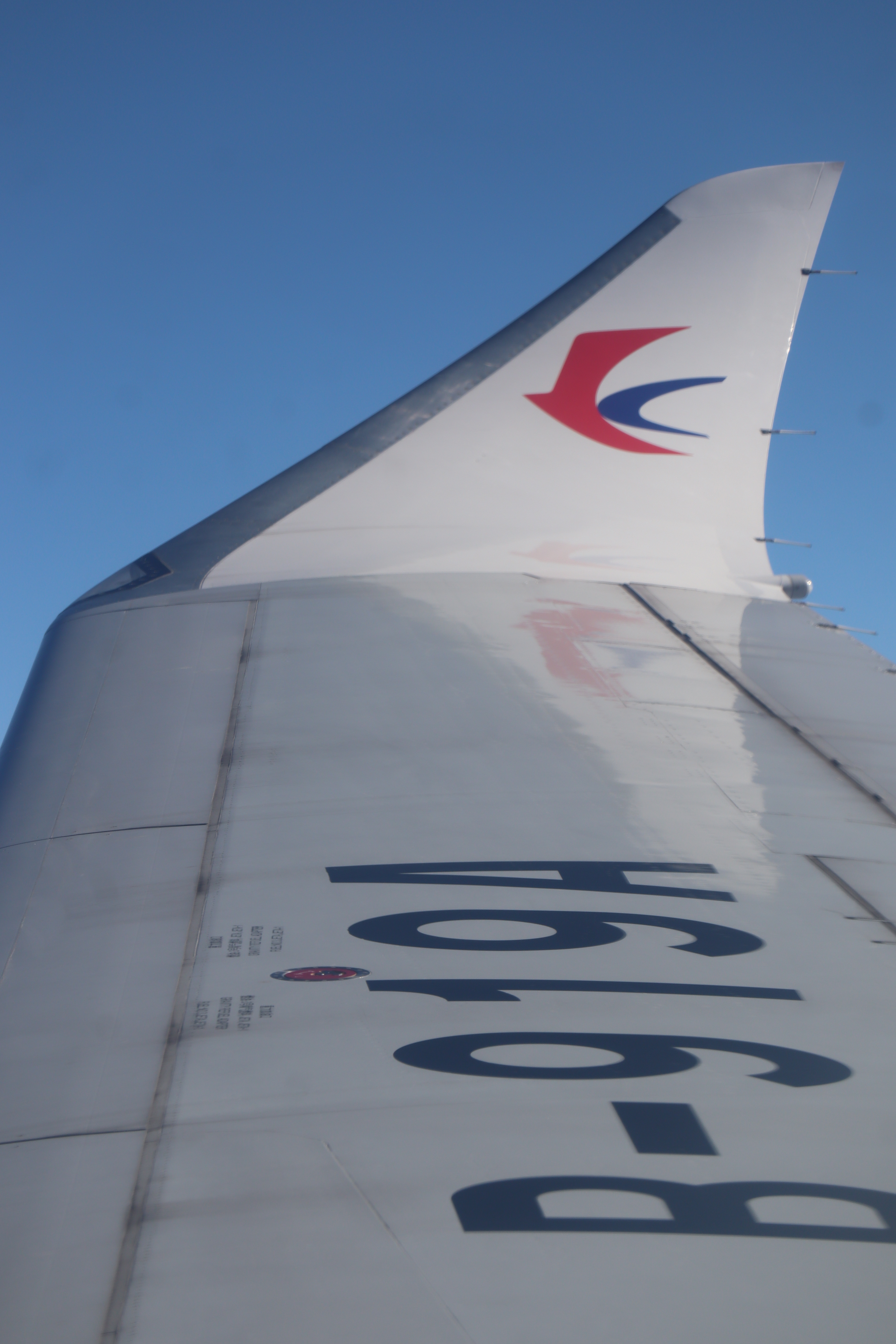
Winglet on China Eastern B-919A

The wing is of a supercritical design, increasing aerodynamic efficiency by 20% and reducing drag by 8% compared to a non-supercritical wing. The center wing box was originally intended to use carbon fibre composites. It was changed later to an aluminium design to reduce design complications.

=== Systems ===
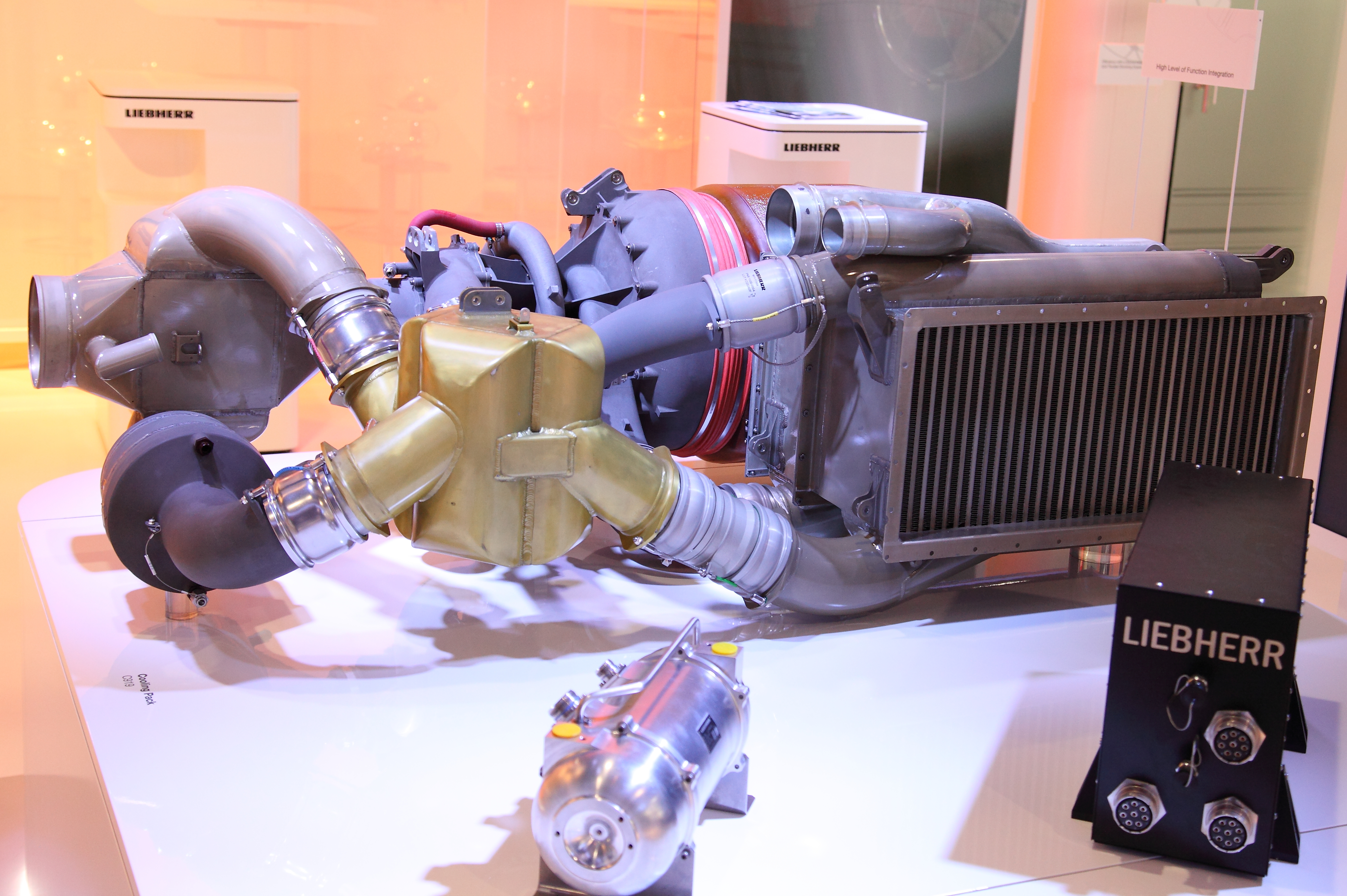
The air conditioning made by Liebherr

The engine's nacelle, thrust reverser and exhaust system is provided by US-based company Nexcelle, with such features as an advanced inlet configuration, the extensive use of composites and acoustic treatment and an electrically operated thrust reverser. The main supplier of tyres is Michelin with its Air X radial tyres, but since 2025 tyres from Sinochem's subsidiary Guilin Lanyu Aviation Tyres may also be used. Its integrated modular avionics architecture is based on Ethernet. The landing gear is made in China by Liebherr LAMC Aviation, a joint venture of Germany's Liebherr and AVIC's Landing Gear Advanced Manufacturing Corp.

While the airframe is entirely made by AVIC, some systems are sourced from a wide variety of international suppliers, similar to Airbus and Boeing. Most such components are sourced from joint-ventures with foreign companies located within China: with UTAS for the electric power, fire protection and lighting; with Collins Aerospace for the cabin systems and avionics, with Thales for the IFE, with Honeywell for the flight controls, APU, wheels and brakes; with Moog for the high lift system; with Parker for the hydraulics, actuators and fuel systems, with Liebherr for the landing gear and air management.

Very few components, such as the CFM International LEAP engine and Nexcelle nacelle, are entirely foreign imported, making them susceptible to US-export-licence restrictions. In 2024, a report stated that Comac was working on a plan to become more self-sufficient in terms of suppliers, with a long-term goal of replacing all US-export-controlled components, because American export restrictions were affecting the ability of Comac to boost jet output. In May 2026, Zhang Yanzhong, a senior academician at the Chinese Academy of Engineering (CAE) and a former chief scientist of the Aviation Industry Corporation of China, said in a paper that a globalised, open supply chain was "no longer suitable" for the needs of the C919 (among other aviation projects), particularly with regard to systems like the auxiliary power unit or the flight controls; he called for a Chinese "national programme" to prevent problems occurring in China's large aircraft supply chain.

=== Engines ===
==== CFM International LEAP-1C ====
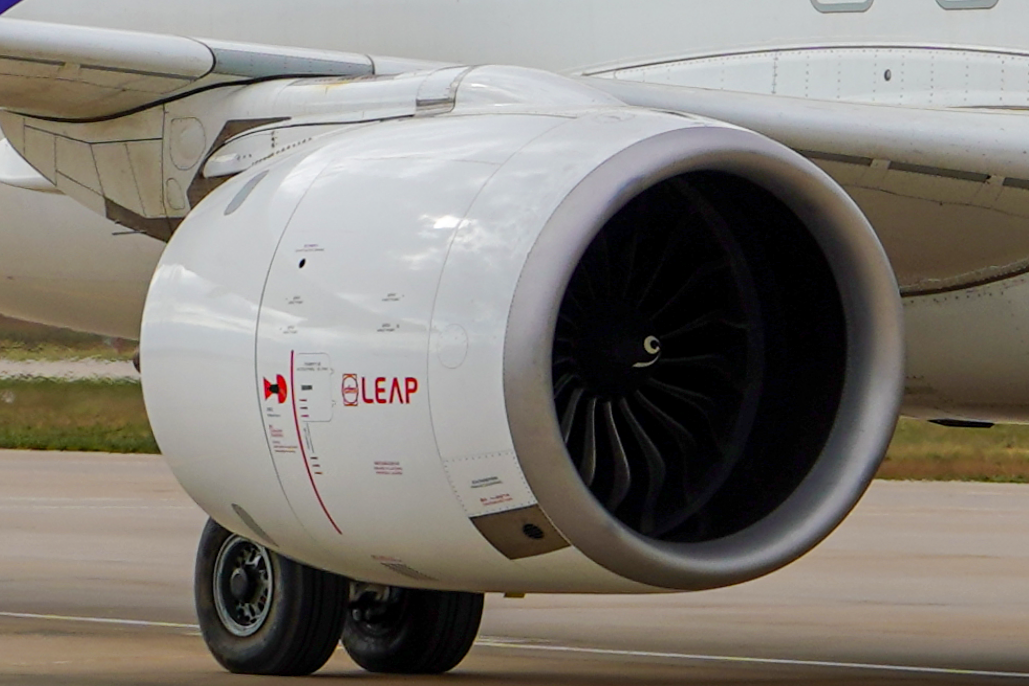
LEAP-1C engine on the C919

Pratt & Whitney and CFM International each offered an engine for the aircraft in 2009, the PW1000G and the LEAP-1C, respectively; the LEAP-1C was selected.

The LEAP-1C family consists of two variants with different thrust ratings, LEAP-1C28 for the C919 STD and LEAP-1C30/1C30B1 for the C919 ER with higher MTOW. LEAP-1C30 and LEAP-1C30B1 has a slightly higher max take off thrust and max continuous thrust compared to the LEAP-1C28.

In February 2020, Reuters reported that the US government was considering blocking GE from selling the LEAP-1C engine to Comac, citing concerns that its technology could be stolen and put into the CJ-1000A engine being developed by the Aero Engine Corporation of China, the competition the C919 could present for Boeing, and military use of technology. Then-President Donald Trump tweeted opposition to blocking sales. The US eventually granted GE a license to sell the engines in April 2020.

The LEAP-1C shares a type certificate with the LEAP-1A. The main difference between the two is that the thrust reverser is integral to the engine on the -1C. It is part of the aircraft system on the -1A.

In May 2025, the United States suspended the sale of LEAP-1C engines to China. The engine sale suspension was lifted in July 2025.

==== AECC CJ-1000A ====
The Aero Engine Corporation of China was tasked with developing an indigenous engine for the aircraft in 2009. Assembly of the first CJ-1000A engine was completed in 18 months in December 2017. The planned entry into service was 2021. The engine first ran in May 2018 to 6,600 rpm core speed.

In March 2023, reports emerged that the flight test campaign for the CJ-1000A engine had started on a Xi'an Y-20 test aircraft. According to experts and top executives from the Aero Engine Corporation of China (AECC), at the beginning of March 2025 the development of the CJ-1000 was "progressing well" in trials, with the engine being able to power a C919 aircraft on verification flights "soon".

According to a January 2026 comment from analyst Mayur Patel from aviation data consultancy OAG Aviation, Chinese certification and initial deliveries of the CJ-1000A engine are likely to begin in 2027 or 2028 while mass production is expected from around 2030. According to the South China Morning Post, aviation expert Brian Yang Bo said in March 2026 that he thought the CJ-1000A would be installed in a first C919 jet for daily use between 2028 and 2029, particularly as a Chinese five-year plan from early 2026 had called for increased aircraft production, development and the roll-out of a domestically developed engine.

=== Cabin ===
==== Seats ====
The cabin has a 3-3 seat layout, which is typical among this class of aircraft like the Airbus A320 or Boeing 737. The middle seat in each 3-seat row is designed to be 1.5 cm wider than the window and aisle seat to provide better comfort for the passenger sitting in the middle.

Currently seats in both business class and economy class are solely supplied by Chinese seat maker Jiatai aircraft equipment Co., Ltd of AVIC cabin systems (ACS). Jiatai JT220B in business and Jiatai JT220E in economy. They both provide a wide range of different configuration choices for the customer, for example adjustable headrest, mobile device holder or USB socket.

== Suppliers ==
=== Import restrictions on US-sourced parts ===
On 2 October 2026, Reuters reported that the United States were planning to restrict exports of critical components for the C919 from the United States to China. The US Commerce Department reportedly had slowed down the export-licensing process for civilian aeroplane parts to China in August and September 2026 in order to strengthen Washington’s position in trade talks with Beijing. According to Reuters, the licensing slowdown was designed to prevent Comac from stockpiling parts.

=== Supplier summary ===
Category	System	Supplier	Country	Remark	Source
Airframe	Body	AVIC	China		
Airframe	High lift system	JV: Moog Inc.-AVIC Qing’an Group	United StatesChina		
Airframe	Main landing gear	Liebherr LAMC Aviation (JV: Liebherr-AVIC)	GermanyChina		
Airframe	Nose wheel	Honeywell Aerospace	United States		
Airframe	Brakes	Honeywell Aerospace	United States	“Carbenix”	
Airframe	Tyres	Michelin	France	“Air X”	
Airframe	Tyres	Sinochem Guilin Lanyu Aviation Tyre	China	Optional	
Avionics	Weather radar	ALRAC (JV: Collins Aerospace-AVIC Leihua ETRI)	United StatesChina		
Avionics	Communication and navigation avionics	RCCAC (JV: Collins Aerospace-CETCA)	United StatesChina		
Avionics	Air data system (ADS)	Honeywell Aerospace	United States		
Avionics	Inertial reference system (IRS)	Honeywell Aerospace	United States	“LASEREF IV”	
Avionics	Flight control system (FCS)	Hongfei Flight Control (JV: Honeywell Aerospace-AVIC Xi’an Automatic Control Technology)	United StatesChina	Fly-by-wire (FBW)	
Avionics	In-flight entertainment system (IFE)	JV: Thales-CETCA	FranceChina	“TopSeries” Optional	
Avionics	Air management system	Liebherr	Germany		
Avionics	Display units (DU)	AVIAGE Systems (JV: GE Aerospace-AVIC)	United StatesChina		
Avionics	Control panels	AVIAGE Systems (JV: GE Aerospace-AVIC)	United StatesChina		
Avionics	Flight management system (FMS)	AVIAGE Systems (JV: GE Aerospace-AVIC)	United StatesChina	“TrueCourse™”	
Avionics	Onboard maintenance system (OMS)	AVIAGE Systems (JV: GE Aerospace-AVIC)	United StatesChina		
Avionics	Flight recorder	AVIAGE Systems (JV: GE Aerospace-AVIC)	United StatesChina		
Avionics	Integrated standby instrument system (ISIS)	AVIAGE Systems (JV: GE Aerospace-AVIC)	United StatesChina		
Avionics	Remote interface unit	AVIAGE Systems (JV: GE Aerospace-AVIC)	United StatesChina		
Avionics	Head-up display unit (HUD)	AVIC Optronics	China	Optional	
Avionics	Enhanced vision system (EVS)	Elbit Systems of America	Israel United States	“Kollsman EVS-SP™” Optional	
Power systems	Engine	CFM International (JV:GE Aerospace-Safran)	United StatesFrance	“LEAP-1C”	
Power systems	Nacelle	Nexcelle (JV: Safran Nacelles-ST Engineering MRAS)	FranceUnited StatesSingapore	“PANACHE”	
Power systems	Thrust reverser	Nexcelle (JV: Safran Nacelles-ST Engineering MRAS)	FranceUnited StatesSingapore	“O-Duct”	
Power systems	Auxiliary power unit (APU)	Honeywell Aerospace	United States	“HGT750[C]”	
Power systems	Electrical power system	JV: RTX Hamilton Sundstrand-AVIC EM	United StatesChina		
Power systems	Fuel system	JV: Parker Aerospace-AVIC	United StatesChina		
Power systems	Inerting system	JV: Parker Aerospace-AVIC	United StatesChina		
Power systems	Hydraulic system	JV: Parker Aerospace-AVIC	United StatesChina		
Cabin	Cabin seating	AVIC Cabin Systems Jiatai Aircraft Equipment	China	JT220B/JT220E” United Kingdom Designed by factorydesign	
Cabin	Oven module	Beijing Andawell Technology	China	“Yuxiang” series Optional	
Cabin	Coffee machine module	Beijing Andawell Technology	China	“Yuxiang” series Optional	
Cabin	Water heater module	Beijing Andawell Technology	China	“Yuxiang” series Optional	

== Market ==
In 2012 the C919 order book stood at 380 units worth US$26 billion, and averaging $68.4 million per unit. FlightGlobal's Ascend market values in 2013 were $49.2 million for the Airbus A320neo, 51% less than its $100.2 million list price and $51.4 million for the Boeing 737 MAX-8, 49% less than its $100.5 million list price.

The Chinese airlines that have placed orders for the C919 already have either the Boeing 737 or Airbus A320 in their fleets. In 2013, an Aviation Week editorial written by Stanley Chao described the bleak prospects for the C919 due to COMAC's lack of experience in commercial aviation. In response, the Chinese state-owned newspaper Global Times complained that Chao's editorial "maliciously disparaged the future outlook for the C919".

COMAC aims to take a fifth of the global narrowbody market and a third of the Chinese market by 2035. It expects 2,000 sales until 2037. The Financial Times commented that China considers the success of the plane a source of national pride.

The newspaper also claimed in 2017 that the C919 was outdated by 10–15 years compared to the Airbus A320neo and Boeing 737 MAX 8, and would probably cost more to operate. Its range of 2,200–3,000 nmi (4,100–5,600 km; 2,500–3,500 mi) fell short of the 3,400 and 3,550 nmi (6,300 and 6,570 km; 3,910 and 4,090 mi) of the A320neo and the 737 MAX 8; the C919 payload-range and economics were similar to the current single-aisles, but would not be able to compete with the Neo and Max.

In 2018, FlightGlobal forecast a total of 1,209 deliveries: 687 standard and 522 stretched variants, 85% of these in China. As of December 2024, all 16 operational C919 had carried more than one million revenue passengers.

The 125% duty imposed by China in April 2025 on American imports to China, in retaliation for US President Trump's tariff hikes, significantly raised the cost of Boeing jets being sold to Chinese airlines. Due to this financial burden, analysts believed that Chinese airlines might begin to lean stronger towards domestic alternatives like COMAC, or towards Airbus planes. In May 2025, Ryanair CEO Michael O'Leary said his airline might consider acquiring COMAC planes in lieu of their planned 737 MAX orders if the tariffs led to an increase in the price of Boeing planes. In response, US lawmaker Raja Krishnamoorthi of the House Select Committee on the CCP asked O'Leary to retract his statements due to security concerns.

== Operators ==
Airline	Country	Photo	Deliveries	Model	Refs
Air China	China		11	C919 ER	
China Eastern Airlines	China		17	C919 STD	
China Southern Airlines	China		11	C919 STD	

=== Orders and deliveries ===
==== Production capacity ====
In January 2023, COMAC said it wanted to expand its production capacity to 150 airliners per year within five years. For comparison: Airbus built an average of 424 planes of the A320neo family per year in the nine years to February 2025. In January 2025, the aircraft manufacturer stated that it hoped to deliver 30 planes in 2025 as it scales up its production, while in 2025 expanding general production capacity to a volume of up to 50 units per year. However, due to US sanctions preventing the delivery of the Western-manufactured LEAP engines, COMAC delivered only 16 aircraft in 2025.

==== Deliveries ====
The first C919 airframe intended for commercial service was delivered to launch customer China Eastern Airlines on 9 December 2022. The second, third, fourth, and fifth airframes were delivered to China Eastern on 14 July 2023, 9 December 2023, 29 December 2023, and 2 March 2024 respectively, thereby completing China Eastern's initial order. A sixth aircraft was delivered to China Eastern Airlines on 28 May 2024. The seventh and eighth aircraft for China Eastern Airlines were delivered to the company on 29 July 2024 and 30 September 2024 respectively. Air China and China Southern Airlines both received their first C919 aircraft on 28 August 2024.

COMAC delivered 15 airframes to the three major Chinese state-owned carriers in 2025. In addition, one airframe with registration number "B-658M" was delivered to COMAC's dedicated charter operator Comac Express around March 2025. In 2025 COMAC had hoped to deliver 30 planes. However, due to US sanctions preventing the delivery of the Western-manufactured LEAP engines, COMAC delivered only five aircraft in the first half of 2025 and a total of 16 for the whole year. Due to further US export license restrictions, including export restrictions on other parts than the LEAP engine, the plane manufacturer only delivered 12 aircraft in 2026, until November 2026.

Deliveries (as of Nov. 2026)
Operator	2022	2023	2024	2025	2026	Total
Air China	0	0	3	6	3	12
China Eastern Airlines	1	2	7	4	3	17
China Southern Airlines	0	0	3	5	5	13
COMAC Express	0	0	0	1	0	1
Annual Total	1	2	13	16	12	
Total	43					

==== Orders ====
At the November 2010 Zhuhai Airshow, Comac announced orders for 55 C919 aircraft from 6 airlines, with an additional 45 options. The purchasing airlines or lessors included China Eastern Airlines, Air China, Hainan Airlines, China Southern Airlines, CDB Leasing Company and Bank of Communications Financial Leasing. On 19 October 2011, Chinese ICBC Leasing ordered 45 C919s and agreed to be the launch customer. On 11 November 2014, Comac announced at the 2014 Zhuhai Airshow that China Merchants Bank's aircraft leasing division made a firm commitment for 30 C919s, and that total orders were now up to 450 aircraft.

At the June 2015 Paris Air Show, Ping An Leasing signed a letter of intent (LOI) for 50 C919s, becoming one of Comac's largest customers, and Puren Group signed a letter of intent for seven C919s and seven ARJ21s, intended for the start-up Puren Airlines. In November 2016 COMAC received an order for 20 C919s including 5 firm from Shanghai Pudong Development Bank Financial Leasing and for 36 C919s from CITIC Group Financial Leasing including 18 firm. While no down payments for the order were needed before C919's maiden flight, 500,000 yuan ($76,000) nevertheless were deposited subsequently for each of the firm order. The 5 December 2017 ICBC Leasing order for 55 brought the order book to 785.

In February 2018, the total order book for the C919 stood at 815, prior to the order for 200 from HNA Group in June 2018 which also included an order for 100 ARJ21s. By August 2018, FlightGlobal counted 305 orders plus 45 options and 658 LOIs: 1008 commitments.

In January 2023, COMAC reported having received more than 1,200 orders. In September 2023, it was reported, however, that C919 orders had reached 1,061.

On 20 September 2023, the Bruneian airline GallopAir placed an order worth US$2 billion for 15 units of C919 and 15 units of ARJ21 jets. Once completed, this would make GallopAir the first non-Chinese & Southeast Asian operator of C919. In a stock exchange filing on 26 April 2024, Air China said that it had ordered 100 C919 aircraft, which would be delivered between 2024 and 2031, thereby adding another high-profile customer for the narrowbody programme.

On 21 November 2024, Chairman of Hong Kong Airlines, Yan Bo was reported to have told Hong Kong-based media that the airline is in plans of acquiring Comac's C919 aircraft following 12 months of sustained fleet growth and the resumption of long-haul flights especially to North America.

=== COMAC Express ===
C919 operated by COMAC Express in Dhaka on a demonstration tour for potential customers.

In 2020, Comac Express took delivery of its first aircraft. It serves as COMAC’s own dedicated subsidiary for wet leasing, crew training, demonstration tours, charters and special missions.

It bears the ICAO code CCS and callsign COMAC EXPRESS.

Orderbook
Customer	Orders	Options
ABC Financial Leasing	65	10
Air China	105	15
AVIC Financial Leasing	15	15
Bank of Communications Financial Leasing	80	—
BOC Aviation	20	—
CCB Financial Leasing	50	—
CDB Financial Leasing	50	—
CMB Financial Leasing	50	
China Aircraft Leasing Co.	20	—
China Eastern Airlines	105	15
China Huarong Financial Leasing	30	—
China Southern Airlines	100	15
Citic Financial Leasing	18	18
GallopAir	15	—
Hainan Airlines	60	—
Hebei Airlines	20	—
Huabao Financial Leasing	15	15
ICBC Financial Leasing	100	—
Jiangsu Financial Leasing	20	
Lao Airlines	2	—
Nuclear Construction Financial Leasing	20	20
Ping An Financial Leasing	50	—
Sichuan Airlines	20	—
Suparna Airlines	30	—
SPDB Financial Leasing	30	15
Tibet Airlines	40	—
Total	1150	138

==== Cancelled orders ====
Orders
Customer	Firm orders	Options LOI/MOU	All	Date
Joy Air		20 (MOU)	20	27 April 2025
City Airways (Note: City Airways orders looks doubtful as it was shut down in early 2016 by the Thai government)		10 (MOU)	10	16 September 2015

==== Potential buyers ====
Orders
Customer	Firm orders	Options LOI/MOU	All	Date
Total Linhas Aéreas				
Garuda Indonesia		15–20	15–20	Sometime between December 2024 and January 2025
AirAsia				
AirBorneo				
Air Karachi				
Ryanair				
Equatorial Congo Airlines				
Kenya Airways				
Asman Airlines				
MIAT Mongolian Airlines				

== Specifications ==
Variant	C919-600	C919		C919-800
Variant	C919-600	C919 STD	C919 ER	C919-800
Cockpit crew	2 pilots			
Seats	140 to 160 (1-class HD)	158 ((8J + 150Y)) to 192 (1-class HD)		200 to 240 (1-class HD)
Cargo capacity	TBA	45.2 m^{3} (1,600 cu ft)		TBA
Length	TBA	38.9 m (127 ft 7 in)		TBA
Wingspan	35.8 m (117 ft 5 in)			
Wing area	TBA	129.15 m^{2} (1,390.2 sq ft)		TBA
Height	TBA	11.95 m (39 ft 2 in)		TBA
Fuselage height	4.166 m (13 ft 8.0 in)			
Fuselage width	3.96 m (13 ft 0 in)			
Maximum payload	TBA	18,900 kg (41,700 lb)		TBA
OEW	TBA	45,700 kg (100,800 lb)		TBA
MTOW	TBA	75,100 kg (165,600 lb)	78,900 kg (173,900 lb)	TBA
Fuel capacity	TBA	24,917 L (5,481 imp gal; 6,582 US gal)		TBA
Engines (×2)	CFMI LEAP-1C	CFMI LEAP-1C28	CFMI LEAP-1C30 CFMI LEAP-1C30B1	TBA
Fan diameter	198 cm (78 in)			
Max. takeoff thrust	TBA	130.0 kN (29,220 lbf)	137.1 kN (30,821 lbf)	TBA
Max. cont. thrust	TBA	127.93 kN (28,760 Ibf)	133.22 kN (29,949 Ibf)	TBA
Cruise	Mach .785 (452 kn; 837 km/h; 520 mph)			
Range (STD PL)	TBA	4,139 km (2,235 nmi; 2,572 mi)	5,576 km (3,011 nmi; 3,465 mi)	TBA
Ceiling	12,100 m (39,800 ft)			
Takeoff (MTOW, ISA)	TBA	2,052 m (6,732 ft)	2,125 m (6,972 ft)	TBA

== See also ==
Related development

- Comac C909
- Comac C929
- Comac C939
- Comac C949

Aircraft of comparable role, configuration, and era

- Airbus A220
- Airbus A320neo family
- Boeing 737 MAX
- Embraer 195
- Yakovlev MC-21

Related lists

- List of jet airliners
- List of airliners
- List of Chinese aircraft
