= City Airways =

Passenger airline of Thailand (2012–2016)

City Airways ซิตี้แอร์เวย์
| IATA | ICAO | Call sign |
|---|---|---|
| E8 | GTA | CITY AIRWAYS |
- Founded: 2011
- Commenced operations: September 2012
- Ceased operations: 13 February 2016
- Hubs: Don Mueang International Airport
- Secondary hubs: Phuket International Airport
- Fleet size: 1 to 4
- Destinations: 3
- Headquarters: Bangkok, Thailand
- Website: www.cityairways.co.th (former website)

City Airways was a passenger airline in Thailand that operated from 2012 to 2016.

== History ==
City Airways was founded in 2011 and began operations in September 2012. Its main hub was Bangkok's Don Mueang International Airport. It operated scheduled and charter flights between Bangkok, Hong Kong and Phuket. The company slogan was Go every city by City Airways.

Its fleet peaked at 4 aircraft. These were predominantly leased Boeing 737-400s, with one Boeing 737-800 from September 2015.

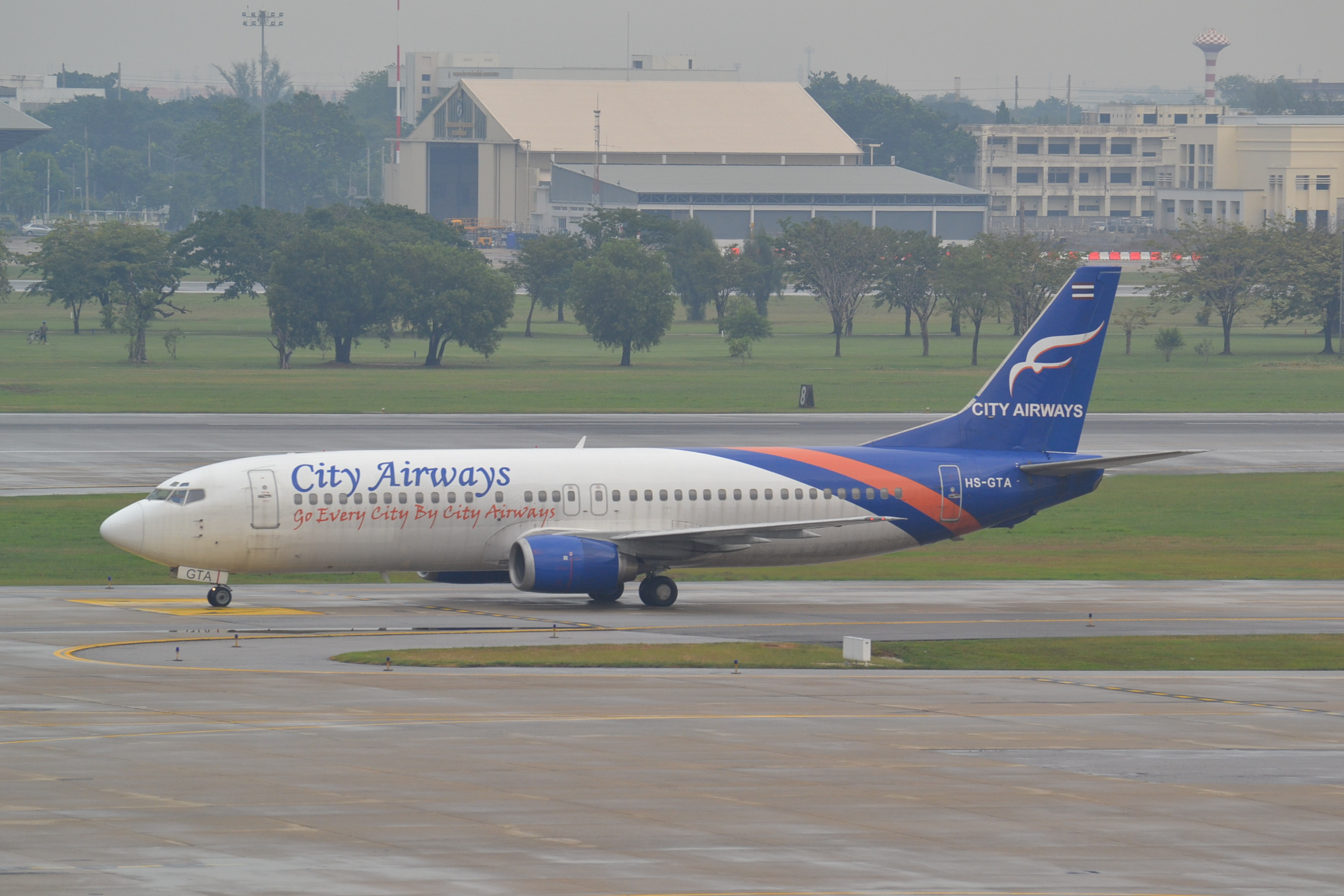
A City Airways Boeing 737-400 at Don Mueang International Airport in November 2013

In 2015, the Chairman of City Airways signed a Memorandum of Understanding with the Industrial and Commercial Bank of China (ICBC) to lease ten Comac C919 and ten Comac ARJ21-700 aircraft.

In February 2016, the airline ceased operations after the Civil Aviation Authority of Thailand revoked its landing rights due to concerns regarding safety and finances. By mid-March 2016 all of its aircraft had been returned to lessors or sold on. The order for the Comac aircraft was cancelled.

== Fleet ==
The fleet of City Airways consisted of the following aircraft:

City Airways Fleet
| Aircraft | In Fleet | Notes |
|---|---|---|
| Boeing 737-400 | 6 | |
| Boeing 737-800 | 1 | |
| Total | 7 | |
