= Nexcelle =

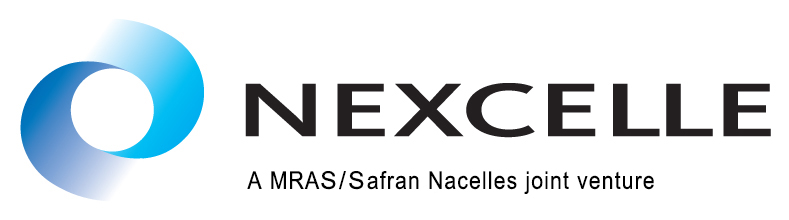
- Type: Joint venture
- Industry: Aerospace
- Founded: 2008; 18 years ago
- Headquarters: Baltimore, Maryland, U.S.
- Key people: Tony Excoffon, President
- Products: Jet engine nacelle systems
- Parent: ST Engineering; Safran
- Website: www.nexcelle.com

Nexcelle is an American joint venture of Singapore's ST Engineering’s Middle River Aerostructure Systems (MRAS) and France's Safran Nacelles – both of which are suppliers of engine nacelles, thrust reversers and aerostructures.

Headquartered in Middle River, Maryland near Baltimore, Nexcelle has teamed with its two parent companies to develop, produce and support integrated propulsion systems for jet engine applications on single-aisle jetliners and business aircraft.

With its initial program win in 2019, Nexcelle took the position as a key partner on the world's first truly integrated propulsion system, the CFM International LEAP-1C engine on China's Comac C919 jetliner. The joint venture subsequently was selected to provide the nacelle and thrust reverser for GE's Passport integrated propulsion system, which powers the Bombardier Global 7000 and Global 8000 business jets.

== History ==
GE Aviation and Safran announced an agreement on a new nacelle joint venture on July 15, 2008 at the Farnborough Airshow in Farnborough, England. Nexcelle was unveiled as the name of the new company on September 21, 2009.

On June 14, 2009, the appointment of Steve Walters as Nexcelle president was announced at the Paris Air Show. Walters had worked in various engineering and leadership roles, with the majority of his career at GE – including two of his most recent roles as director of Business Operations for the CFM56 engine program and the airfoils business Quality and Compliance leader for GE Aviation.

Also at the 2009 Paris Air Show, Nexcelle's cooperative nacelle systems agreement with CFM International was detailed. This accord covers the development and production of integrated propulsion systems for potential new applications for CFM engines.

Michel J. Abella was announced as the Director of Programs at Nexcelle on December 18, 2009.

In December 2009, Nexcelle became a partner on the world's first truly integrated propulsion system. The company was selected to provide a combined nacelle, thrust reverser and exhaust system for the new CFM International LEAP-1C engine selected as the sole western powerplant to launch China’s COMAC C919 jetliner. Nexcelle's contribution to the LEAP-1C on the C919 includes an innovative nacelle design that is produced with a significant percentage of composites, and which incorporates advanced acoustic treatment. It also is to be equipped with an Electrical Thrust Reverser Actuation System (ETRAS).

Other key features of Nexcelle’s nacelle system for the LEAP-1C include an all-new translating O-Duct thrust reverser configuration; a fan cowl that is structurally integrated to the engine; and an integrated mounting system for reduced engine distortion and enhanced on-wing performance.

Based on Nexcelle’s work-sharing arrangement with its two parent companies, the C919 nacelle system’s lead industrial role is assigned to Safran Nacelles, which developed and supplies the O-Duct thrust reverser. Safran Nacelles also brings its ETRAS expertise for use in the O-Duct’s deployment. Middle River Aerostructure Systems is responsible for supplying the nacelle’s inlet, fan cowls, inner fixed structure and engine mounts.

In October 2010, GE selected Nexcelle to provide the nacelle and thrust reverser for the GE Passport engine on Bombardier’s Global 7000 business jet. The Global 7500’s announcement was made at the NBAA Annual Meeting and Convention, with the aircraft’s designation subsequently changed to the Global 7500. At the Paris Air Show in June 2011, Nexcelle signed the purchase agreement for its supply of the GE Passport’s nacelle system to GE Aviation for the Global 7500.

Nexcelle's presence at the 2011 Paris Air Show also included a functional half-scale model demonstrating key elements of the company's integrated propulsion system concepts for jet engines on airliners.

In January 2012, Nexcelle announced the appointment of Huntley Myrie as its new president – succeeding the company's first president, Steve Walters, who moved on to become the product leader for GE Aviation’s nacelle and aerostructures activities.

Nexcelle began full-scale testing of Safran Nacelle’s advanced nacelle demonstrator – called PANACHE (Pylon And Nacelle Advanced Configuration for High Efficiency) – in May 2012, marking a first validation of the thrust reverser element for the company's integrated propulsion system technology applied to the LEAP-1C on the C919 jetliner. This activity occurred at GE Aviation's Peebles Test Operation in Ohio, and it involved 200 cycles representing normal deployments, rejected take-off deployments and aborted landings.

Michel Abella was appointed president of Nexcelle in August 2013. Ken Onderko took over the role in December 2016.

The no. 1 C919 made its maiden flight in May 2017, deploying the O-Duct thrust reverser during the jetliner’s first landing – demonstrating its performance from the start-up of flight testing. For the aircraft’s test and certification flights, personnel from MRAS were stationed at several locations in China.

Bombardier’s initial Global 7500 business jet was delivered in December 2018, marking the first service entry a Nexcelle nacelle system. Among the key features of Nexcelle’s nacelle system on the Global 7500’s Passport engine are its simplified composite fan cowl that allows for improved maintenance and reduced system weight; a one-piece extended aluminum inlet lip-outer barrel for reduced aerodynamic drag; and a 360-degree, single-piece extended composite inner barrel incorporating advanced acoustic protection for lower engine noise levels. The nacelle also has an innovative anti-ice system that uses a directed flow nozzle concept.

Under the Nexcelle joint venture work sharing arrangement, Middle River Aerostructure Systems supplies the nacelle system’s inlet, fan cowls and apron adapter for the Global 7500’s side-fuselage mounted Passport powerplants, while Safran Nacelles produces the target-type thrust reverser.

Nexcelle marked a major program milestone in 2021 with its delivery of the 200th production nacelle for the Global 7500’s Passport turbofan engines.

In 2019, MRAS was acquired by ST Engineering North America, the U.S. affiliate of Singapore-based ST Engineering – becoming a part of ST Engineering’s global network of aerospace facilities and offices. With the ownership change, the company’s original Middle River Aircraft Systems designation was changed to Middle River Aerostructure Systems.

Sugato Bhattacharjee, a Middle River Aerostructure Systems employee, was named the President of Nexcelle in 2021, with Safran Nacelle’s Tony Excoffon becoming the joint venture’s Executive Vice President during the same year.

The C919 jetliner was issued its airworthiness type certification by the Civil Aviation Administration of China (CAAC) in September 2022. COMAC made the initial delivery of a C919 in December 2022 to China Eastern Airlines. With commercial service targeted in the spring of 2023, this milestone C919 was configured with 164 seats in a two-class cabin layout.

In 2023, Tony Excoffon succeeded Sugato Bhattacharjee as Nexcelle’s President, based on the alternating management agreement of the two parent companies.
