= List of airlines of Brunei =

This is a list of airlines currently operating in Brunei.

== Scheduled airlines ==
Airline	Image	IATA	ICAO	Callsign	Commenced operations	Notes	Hub
Royal Brunei Airlines		BI	RBA	BRUNEI	1974		Brunei International Airport
GallopAir					2024		Brunei International Airport

== Government airlines ==
Airline	Image	IATA	ICAO	Callsign	Commenced operations	Notes	Hub
His Majesty The Sultan's Flight			SFB				

== See also ==
- List of airlines
- List of defunct airlines of Asia
- List of defunct airlines of State of Brunei
