= GallopAir =

Brunei airline start-up

- Founded: 2023; 3 years ago
- Hubs: Brunei International Airport
- Headquarters: Bandar Seri Begawan, Brunei
- Key people: Yang Qiang (Owner); Cham Chi (CEO)

GallopAir is a start-up airline in Brunei backed by Shaanxi Tianju Investment Group, a Chinese conglomerate. Businessman Yang Qiang is the founder and owner of the conglomerate. The airline has not taken delivery of any aircraft yet.

== History ==
The airline first made headlines in the aviation industry when they announced in September 2023 the purchase of 30 units of Comac C909 aircraft in a deal worth $2 billion.

GallopAir flew a demonstration flight on 31 December 2024, from Guangzhou Baiyun International Airport to Brunei International Airport, with a Comac C909 chartered from China Southern Airlines.

In October 2025, Brunei's aviation regulator announced that it would permit aircraft certified in China to fly to Brunei, a necessary precondition for operating COMAC aircraft. Previously Brunei only approved aircraft certified by US, Canadian, European or Brazilian regulators.

== Fleet ==
On 20 September 2023, GallopAir placed a US$2 billion order for 30 Comac aircraft. Once completed, this would make GallopAir the first operator of the C919 outside China. The ARJ21 ordered includes three freighters, one business jet, and one medical evacuation plane.

GallopAir fleet
Aircraft	In Service	Orders	Total
Comac C909	–	12	
Comac C909F	–	3	
Comac C919	–	15	
Total	–	30	

== See also ==
- List of airlines of Brunei
- List of companies of Brunei
