= BNS Ali Haider (2014) =

Frigate of the Bangladesh Navy

History

Bangladesh
- Name: Ali Haider
- Builder: Hudong Shipyard, Shanghai
- Launched: 9 August 1986
- Acquired: December 2013
- Commissioned: 1 March 2014
- In service: 2014 - present
- Home port: Chittagong
- Identification: Pennant number: F-17
- Status: In active service

General characteristics
- Class & type: Modified Type 053H2 frigate
- Displacement: 1,700 tons (empty); 2,000+ tons (full)
- Length: 339 ft (103.3 m)
- Beam: 37 ft (11.3 m)
- Draft: 10.5 ft (3.2 m)
- Propulsion: 2 × 12E390VA engines, 880 kW (1,180 hp) at 480 rpm; 2 shafts
- Speed: 26.5 knots (49.1 km/h; 30.5 mph)
- Range: 2,700 mi (4,300 km) at 18 knots (33 km/h; 21 mph)
- Complement: 160 (27 officers)
- Sensors & processing systems: Selex ES Kronos NAVAL 3D multifunctional radar, C-band; Type 352 Radar (Square Tie) surface search fire-control, I-band; Type 343G (Wasp Head) fire control radar for main gun, G/H-band; 2 x Type 341 fire control radar for dual 37 mm AA gun; 2 x Racal RM-1290 navigation radars, I-band; SJD-5 medium-frequency sonar; SJC-1B reconnaissance sonar; SJX-4 communications sonar; Communication: SNTI-240 SATCOM
- Electronic warfare & decoys: RWD-8 (Jug Pair) intercept EW suite; ZKJ-3A combat data/management system; Type 9230I radar warning receiver; Type 651A IFF; 2 × Mark 36 SRBOC 6-barrel decoy rocket launchers
- Armament: 2 × 4 C-802A AShM; 2 × Type 79 dual-100 mm gun; 4 × Type 76 dual-37 mm AA guns; 2 × RBU-1200 5-tube ASW rocket launchers; 2 × DC racks

BNS Ali Haider is a Type 053H2 guided-missile frigate of Bangladesh Navy. The warship is serving in Bangladesh Navy since 2014. It is named after the fourth Rashidun Caliph Ali.

== Armament ==
The ship is armed with two quad-pack C-802A anti-ship missile launchers. The C-802A missiles have range of 180 kilometres (110 mi). It also carries two Type 79A dual-100 mm gun to engage surface targets. For air defence role, the ship carries four Type 76 dual-37 mm AA guns. For anti-submarine operations, the ship has two five tube RBU-1200 anti-submarine rocket launchers. she also carries two depth charge (DC) racks and four DC projectors. There are two Mark 36 SRBOC 6-barrel decoy rocket launchers in the ship too.

== Career ==
The Type 053H2 frigate BNS Ali Haider was previously known as Wuhu which served with People's Liberation Army Navy (PLAN) in East Sea Fleet. It was commissioned in PLAN in 1987. In 2013 the ship was sold to Bangladesh Navy. She was commissioned on 1 March 2014 as BNS Ali Haider (F-17).

BNS Ali Haider left for Lebanon to participate in the UN mission United Nations Interim Force in Lebanon (UNIFIL) on 12 May 2014. She replaced the ship BNS Osman there from 14 June 2014.

After completion of the UNIFIL deployment period, the ship visited the Port of Colombo in Sri Lanka from 7 February to 9 February 2018 on her way back home.

Ali Haider took part in Coordinated Patrol (CORPAT-2019) exercise with the Indian Navy along the Bangladesh-India maritime border from 10 to 12 October 2019. The ship reached Visakhapatnam Port of India as a part of exercise on 12 October 2019. She came back home on 18 October 2019.

== See also ==
- List of active ships of the Bangladesh Navy
