= BNS Abu Bakr (2014) =

Frigate of the Bangladesh Navy

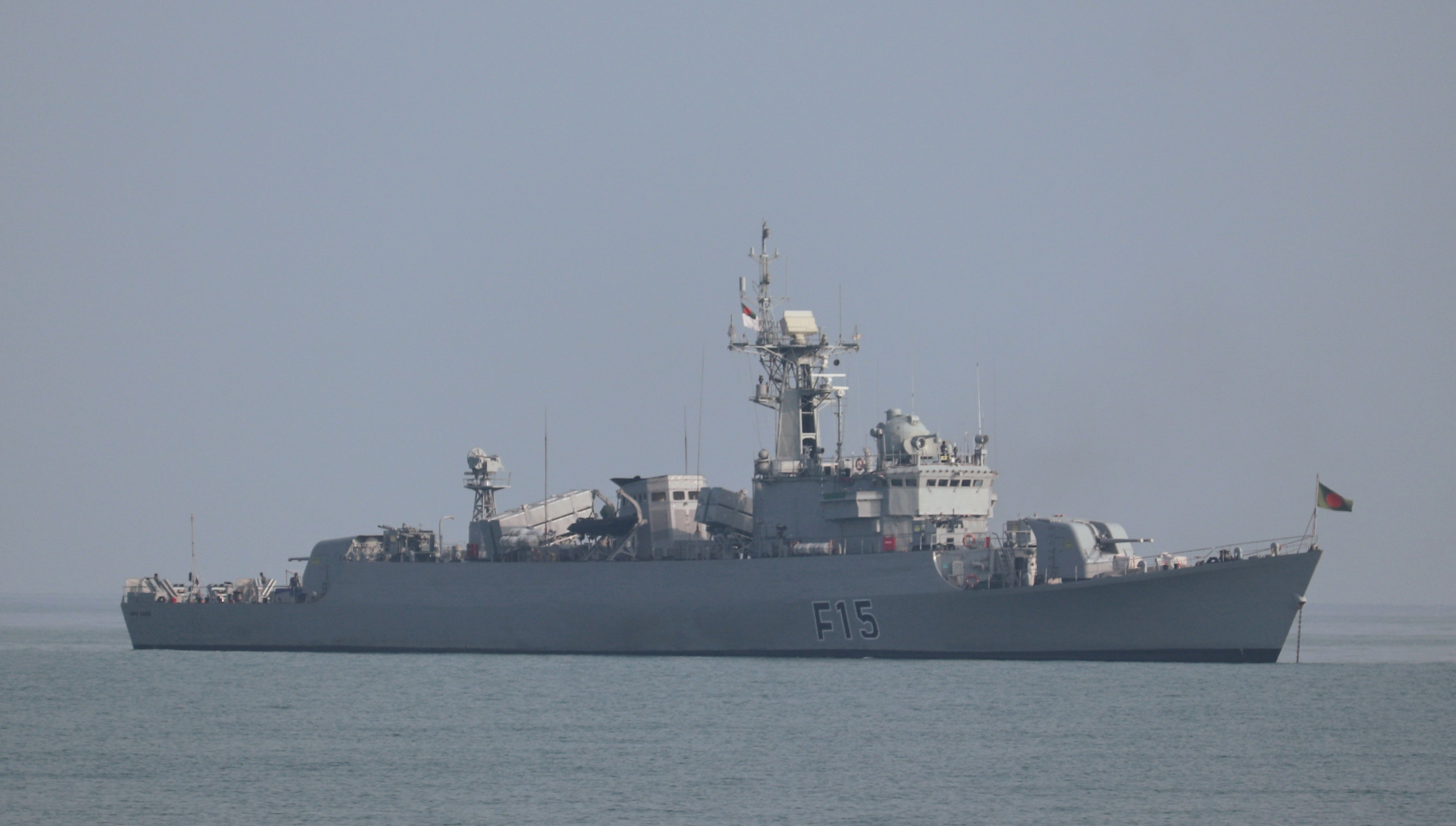
- BNS Abu Bakr (F15) off the coast of St. Martin's Island

History

Bangladesh
- Name: Abu Bakr
- Builder: Hudong Shipyard, Shanghai
- Launched: 28 December 1985
- Acquired: December 2013
- Commissioned: 1 March 2014
- Home port: Chittagong
- Identification: Pennant number: F-15
- Status: In active service

General characteristics
- Class & type: Modified Type 053H2 frigate
- Displacement: 1,700 tons (empty); 2,000+ tons (full)
- Length: 339 ft (103.3 m)
- Beam: 37 ft (11.3 m)
- Draft: 10.5 ft (3.2 m)
- Propulsion: 2 × 12E390VA 880 kW (1,180 hp) at 480 rpm; 2 shafts
- Speed: 26.5 knots (49.1 km/h; 30.5 mph)
- Range: 2,700 mi (4,300 km) at 18 knots (33 km/h; 21 mph)
- Complement: 160 (27 officers)
- Sensors & processing systems: Selex ES Kronos NAVAL 3D multifunctional radar, C-band; Type 352 Radar (Square Tie) surface search fire-control, I-band; Type 343G (Wasp Head) fire control radar for main gun, G/H-band; 2 x Type 341 fire control radar for dual 37 mm AA gun; 2 x Racal RM-1290 navigation radars, I-band; SJD-5 medium-frequency sonar; SJC-1B reconnaissance sonar; SJX-4 communications sonar; Communication: SNTI-240 SATCOM
- Electronic warfare & decoys: RWD-8 (Jug Pair) intercept EW suite; ZKJ-3A combat data/management system; Type 9230I radar warning receiver; Type 651A IFF; 2 × Mark 36 SRBOC 6-barrel decoy rocket launchers
- Armament: 2 × 4 C-802A AShM; 2 × Type 79 dual-100 mm gun; 4 × Type 76 dual-37 mm AA guns; 2 × RBU-1200 5-tube ASW rocket launchers; 2 × DC racks

BNS Abu Bakr (sometimes spelt Abu Bakar) is a Type 053H2 guided-missile frigate of Bangladesh Navy. The warship has been serving with the Bangladesh Navy since 2014. It is named after the first Rashidun Caliph Abu Bakr.

== Armament ==
The ship is armed with two quad-pack C-802A anti-ship missile launchers. The C-802A missiles have range of 180 kilometres (110 mi). It also carries two Type 79A dual-100 mm gun to engage surface targets. For air defence role, the ship carries four Type 76 dual-37 mm AA guns. For anti-submarine operations, the ship has two five tube RBU-1200 anti-submarine rocket launchers. she also carries two depth charge (DC) racks and four DC projectors. There are two Mark 36 SRBOC 6-barrel decoy rocket launchers in the ship too.

== Service history ==
Type 053H2 frigate BNS Abu Bakr was previously known as Huangshi, which served with People's Liberation Army Navy (PLAN) in the East Sea Fleet. She was commissioned in PLAN in 1986. In 2013 the ship was sold to the Bangladesh Navy.

BNS Abu Bakr was commissioned into the Bangladesh Navy on 1 March 2014. She is currently based at Chattogram under Commodore Commanding BN Flotilla.

From 21 to 25 April 2014, Abu Bakr took part in the 14th Western Pacific Naval Symposium and International Fleet Review-2014 at Qingdao, Shandong Province, China. During the tour, the ship visited the ports of Klang, Malaysia, Hong Kong, Sanya, China and Phuket, Thailand in a goodwill mission.

On 12 March 2015, the ship left for Malaysia to take part in the 2015 Langkawi International Maritime and Aerospace Exhibition (LIMA). On her return journey, she visited the port of Yangon, Myanmar on a goodwill mission. She arrived at Chattogram on 31 March 2015.

The ship took part in Cooperation Afloat Readiness and Training (CARAT), an annual bilateral exercise with United States Navy, in 2015.

Abu Bakr visited the port of Colombo, Sri Lanka from 21 to 23 October 2015 on a goodwill visit.

In 2017, the ship received an upgrade and its old Chinese Type 354 surface search radar and Type 517H-1 air search radar was replaced with new generation Selex ES-made Kronos NAVAL 3D multifunction C-band AESA radar. This new radar has a range of 250 km.

BNS Abu Bakr participated in Exercise Bongosagar-2020, a bilateral exercise with Indian Navy, held on 4 to 5 October 2020 in the northern Bay of Bengal region. She also took part in the IN-BN Coordinated Patrol (CORPAT)-2020 exercise along the Bangladesh-India maritime border after the Bongosagar exercise ends.

== See also ==
- List of active ships of the Bangladesh Navy
