= H/ZKJ =

Chinese military combat data management systems

H/ZKJ series and its derivative H/ZKT series naval systems are Chinese combat data /management systems (CDS/CMS) installed on board Chinese surface combatants of the People's Liberation Army Navy (PLAN), and they are usually referred as ZKJ and ZKT for short. The designation is an abbreviation of Pinyin: H for Haijun (海军, meaning naval in Chinese), Z for Zhihui (指挥, meaning command in Chinese), and K for Kongzhi (控制, meaning control in Chinese), J for Jian (舰, meaning ship in Chinese) and T for Ting (艇, meaning boat vivid pop in Chinese).

== Type 673-I Poseidon-1 ==
The predecessor of all Chinese CDS/CMS is the first CDS in China designated as Type 670-1, which was developed by the 706th Institute under the request of 701st and 713th Institutes, when the latter two were assigned to develop Type 051 destroyer in 1966. Mr. Qin Xue-Chang (秦学昌, born in 1940 in Chongming County) as the general designer, with the CDS designated as Type 670-I shipborne combat information center, and given the name Poseidon-1 (Hai-shen Yi-Hao, 海神1号), with development begun in 1966 and concluded seven years later.

Type 670-I CDS is a centralized system based on specially developed 22-bit, 8K-RAM, MLB minicomputers, which is built on DTL small-scale integrated circuits (IC). The minicomputer is capable of performing two hundred thousand operations per second (ops/sec). The thirty-one centimeter display is fully transistorized and adopts a mixture of analog and digital circuitry. If accepted into service, the system would be designated as ZKJ, short for Zi-dong Kong-zhi Ji-qi (自动控制机器), meaning automatic control machine, because system was intended to automate shipborne weaponry control that was performed manually. However, the political turmoil in China at the time, namely, the Cultural Revolution, had serious hampered the development of the first Chinese CDS. The only prototype built was plagued with reliability problem, and instead of the originally name planned, the system was frequently and candidly referred by the nickname given by the sailors as seasick machine (Yun-chuan-ji, 晕船机) due to its frequent breakdowns, especially in severe sea states. As a result, Type 670-I Poseidon-1 did not enter service after seven years of development. Although Type 670-1 failed to enter production and service, it is nonetheless an important milestone in the development of CDS in China in that it has provided the foundation of CDS framework for similar systems developed later in China.

== Type 673-II Poseidon-2/ZKJ-I ==
In 1970, orders were given to develop a successor of earlier Type 673-I CDS named Poseidon-2, with the same general designer reassigned to the 724th Institute. Type 673-II follows the same design of its predecessor but with a new computer developed by the 709th Institute. The 32K-RAM, 32-bit new computer is designated as Type 911, and based on small-scale TTL IC, it is capable of performing half a million ops/sec. Type 671-II can automatically provide fire solution channels for Type 342 and Type 343 radars in real time. The one meter by one meter display of Type 670-II CDS is much larger than that of its predecessor.

The political turmoil once again severely hampered the development of Type 673-II CDS, it was not until in November 1979, three years after the end of the Cultural Revolution, when the system first begun its trials on land, utilizing Type 381 passive phased array radar. In April 1980, the system was installed on board Type 051 destroyer No. 105 in Dalian for sea trials, which were conducted in July and August the same year, utilizing Type 354 surface search radar. In October 1983, the system was removed from Destroyer No. 105 and installed on board another Type 051 destroyer, No. 132 in Shanghai for further sea trials in Zhoushan, which was completed in twenty days in December 1983, utilizing Type 354 and Type 342 fire control radar. Type 673-II CDS is capable of handling a total of seventeen batches of targets.

When Type 673-II was accepted into service after thirteen years of development, it received PLAN designation H/ZKJ-I, and the original name of automatic control machine given in the Cultural Revolution was changed to a much more accurate description of Naval / Command, Control, Shipborne (H/ZKJ: Haijun / Zhihui-Kongzhi-Jianzai, 海军/指挥-控制-舰载), though the Pinyin abbreviation remains the same. Type 673-II/ZKJ-I was used on early models of Type 051 destroyer No. 132. ZKJ-1 subsequently was upgraded to ZKJ-1A standard, and the major improvement is the replacement of Type 911 computer with more advanced computer by 724th Institute.

== Poseidon-3/ZKJ-II ==
ZKJ-II is frequently but erroneously referred by many as ZKJ-3, but in reality, ZKJ-II is the actual CDS based on Racal Marine Radar CTC-1629 (CTC: Command Tactical Console) combat direction system, which can simultaneously track 20 targets. The general designer of ZKJ-II is Mr. Yan Jun-Xing (严俊星), and the CDS is named as Poseidon-3. Developed by the 724th Research Institute, ZKJ-II is installed on Type 053K Jiangdong class frigates.

Based on the British CTC-1629, one of the characteristics of ZKJ-II is that it is linked to domestic Chinese fire control system (FCS), and one of the most important of these is SIASWFCS, which is the abbreviation of Shipborne Integrated Anti-Submarine Warfare Fire Control System (Chinese: 舰载综合反潜火控系统 Jian-zai Zong-he Fan-qian Huo-kong Xi-tong), the first kind in Chinese service. SIASWFCS links up onboard sensors and ASW weaponry, and once top priority targets are identified, SIASWFCS would be able to simultaneously engage two targets by automatically providing fire solutions for Type 65 ASW mortars, ASW rocket/missile launchers and ASW torpedo tubes. SIASWFCS can provide fire solutions to two different targets with up to two different types of ASW weaponry simultaneously and it (and later models) has been standard equipment on board Chinese warships since.

== Poseidon-4/ZKJ-3 ==
Originally designated as ZKJ-III and named as Poseidon-4, but later re-designated as ZKJ-3, ZKJ-3 is designed to replace minicomputers in earlier designs with microcomputers with multilayered architecture, using Intel 8086 microprocessors. ZKJ-3 CDS has multiple input/output interfaces, and the software can be expanded when needed thanks to its modular design. In comparison to earlier Type 673-II/ZKJ-I CDS, the capability of ZKJ-3 has been expanded. Some of the additional capability includes compatibility with Type 352 targeting radar for anti-ship missiles and Type 681A IFF, and providing info from SJD-5 sonar to antisubmarine depth charge launchers. ZKJ-3 CDS also incorporates tactical software developed by Dalian Naval Academy, which includes two portions, one for threat analysis, and the other for ship maneuvering to assist naval commanders to make tactical decisions.

ZKJ-III was first installed on Type 053H2 Jianghu-III class frigate No. 535 in December 1986, and the 2nd set was subsequently installed on the 2nd ship of the same class No. 536. The 3rd ship of the class No. 527 received an upgraded version ZKJ-IIIA. A further upgraded version designated as ZKJ-IIIB is reported to equip Type 053H1G Jianghu-V class frigates, while ZKJ-IIIC is installed on Type 053H2G Jiangwei-I class frigates and Type 053H3 Jiangwei-II class frigates. Starting with this model, all ZKJ series are renamed following the convention used on the export model for Thailand, with Roman numerals replaced by Arabic numbers.

=== CCS-3 ===
An export version ZKJ-III designated as CCS-1 (reported to be the abbreviation of Command and Control System 3, from ZKJ-III it was developed from) was installed on board two Type 53T and two Type 053HT frigates built for Royal Thai Navy. CCS-3 differs from ZKJ-3 mainly in data links: Thai ships were equipped with a data link back to shore headquarters, and after delivery, a US inter-ship data link is also incorporated. The general designer of CCS-3 is Mr. Chen Yongqing (陈永清). The CIC associated with ZKJ-3 was ECIC-1, rumored to be electrical combat information center. The significance of CCS-3 is that it naming practice was adopted by Chinese for later models in the future CDS, with Arabic numbers replaced the Roman numerals.

== ZKJ-4 ==
Originally designated as ZKJ-IV and later re-designated as ZKJ-4, it was a subsystem of Type 051G destroyer in Type 051 destroyer upgrade program. Development of ZKJ-4A begun in January 1984 by the 709th Institute using eleven Intel 80/30 microcomputers, and the CDS is built to RS-232 and RS-422 specs/standards. ZJK-4A is capable of tracking and processing sixty batches of targets in fully automatic mode, and tracking eighty batches of targets in manual mode. Land trials begun in November 1986 in Lianyungang, and sea trials were conducted in May 1987, and the system was delivered and installed on Type 051G destroyer No. 165 in 1988. An improved version designated as ZKJ-4AG was installed on the 2nd unit of Type 051G destroyer No. 166.

Contrary to many frequent but erroneous claims, ZKJ-4/4A/4AG is not a Chinese copy of French TAVITAC (Traitement Automatique et VIsualisation TACtique) because the French CDS were not delivered to China after ZKJ-4/4A/4AG series were already completed: on November 23, 1984, China decided to import naval SAM, ASW helicopter and torpedo. From July 10 thru September 26, 1985, a Chinese delegation from Poly Technologies headed by Rear Admiral Zheng Ming (郑明), the head of PLAN Equipment Department evaluated French naval systems developed by Thomson-CSF, including TAVITAC, Crotale SAM, and associated Castor fire control radar. On December 22, 1986, French systems were selected by China and contract was signed in the following month in January 1987 for two sets, which were subsequently delivered in the following year. On August 24, 1988, installation of the first set on board Type 051 destroyer No. 109 begun, and the 2nd set was also installed on another ship of Type 051 destroyer (rumored to be No. 110). Due to the urgent need, both set of French systems were installed on ships and nothing was left for research and reverse engineering like other foreign systems China imported. Therefore, ZKJ-4/4A/4AG is not a Chinese copy of French TAVITAC.

=== ZKJ-4B ===
ZKJ-4B series CDS with modular design is the first Chinese CDS utilizes ruggedized computers, and it is the Chinese equivalent of Italian Alenia IPN-10 combat data system, and borrowed heavily from SADOC 2 (systema dirizione della operazioni di combattimento) CDS, the export version of IPN-10 delivered to China in 1985. The Italian design features such as three-man level display and MIL-STD-1553B spec/standard are adopted for later models. ZKJ-4B incorporates 052 Integrated Command Decision-making System (052综合指挥决策系统), a software named after Type 052 destroyer it was planned to equip, and it is decision making software developed by Dalian Naval Academy. After land trials in 1990 in Lianyungang, ZKJ-4B was shipped to Shanghai and installed on board Type 052 destroyer No. 112.

Only a single set of ZKJ-4B was completed, and it was followed by ZKJ-4BII, which is installed on board the 2nd Type 052 destroyer No. 113. In addition, ZKJ-4BII CDS is also installed on board Type 051B destroyer No. 167. During the upgrades of these ships in the early and mid-2010s, ZKJ-4B/4BII series has been replaced by more advanced ZKJ-5 CDS.

== ZKJ-5 ==
ZKJ-5 is a CDS developed by the 709th Institute to replace all previous CDS on major surface combatants of PLAN. The general designer of ZKJ-5 was Zhang Zihe (张子鹤), head of the 709th Research Institute of the 7th Academy of China Shipbuilding Industry Corporation. Other important figures in ZKJ-5 program included program engineers Li Shuyun (李淑云) and Hu Bin (胡彬). Zhang Zihe pioneered the design of incorporating microcomputer/PC to the system, which was almost rejected when first proposed because it was the first attempt in China, but eventually the idea was accepted and proved successful. PCs/microcomputers incorporated in ZKJ-5 combat data system are the intelligence workstations to replace the dumb terminals used on previous systems.

ZKJ-5 is a distributed system with duplex fiber optic Ethernet and video feed, incorporating dozens of software packages and data banks. ZKJ-5 is installed on board Type 052 destroyers and Type 054A frigates, and as older ships of PLAN receive their upgrade, earlier CDS such as ZKJ-4 series have been replaced by ZKJ-5 CDS. ZKJ-5 CDS is able to receive orders from higher level on the chain of command, and coordinate the battle plan as whole, as well as providing the battle plan of the ship to the high level in the chain of command, which is essential in network centric warfare.

== ZKT-1 ==
In addition to ZKJ series CDS, China has also developed ZKT series CDS, which is intended for fast attack crafts such as missile boats, and other lightly armed surface combatants such as patrol ships, light frigates, and amphibious warfare ships. The current series is ZKT-1, which is developed by the 716th Institute. Instead of the three tiered command system of ZKJ series, ZKT series adopts two-tiered command system. ZKT series does share the same characteristics of centralized command and integrated control of ZKJ series.

ZKT-1 is the first model of the ZKT series CDS, with development completed in 1992. ZKT-1 CDS is very flexible thanks to its modular design, and depending on the onboard weaponry, the operator consoles can be adjusted accordingly. ZKT-1 was first used on Type 037II Houjian-class missile boat of PLAN, and it was built to the MIL-STD-1553B standard. ZKT-1A and ZKT-1B CDS are subsequent succeeding models developed from ZKT-1, and in comparison to ZKT-1, the latest models in the series have been upgraded significantly by incorporating tactical software, databanks, and amphibious warfare software and command system, and helicopter control system. Other features includes duplex fiber optic Ethernet and video feed, like that adopted by ZKJ series CDS. ZKT-1B is installed on board Type 071 amphibious transport dock of PLAN.

== ZBJ-1 ==
H/ZBJ is the fleet command system developed by China for its PLAN. The designation is an abbreviation of Pinyin: H for Haijun (海军, meaning naval in Chinese), Z for Zhihui (指挥, meaning command in Chinese), and B for Biandui (编队, meaning fleet formation in Chinese), J for Jian (舰, meaning ship in Chinese). The official H/ZBJ designation is generally abbreviated as ZBJ. Instead of building specialized command ship, PLAN takes a different approach by installing fleet command systems on large principal surface combatants to act as command ship. The first PLAN naval ship with a modern fleet command system installed is its Type 051B destroyer No. 167. In addition to command surface fleet, the ship is also capable of command amphibious warfare. However, the 1990s technology utilized was not satisfactory, because the resulting system was too bulky and too heavy. As a result, subsequent ships of PLAN were not equipped with this first generation Chinese naval fleet command system, and it was not until Type 052C destroyer when PLAN ships begun to be equipped with fleet command systems. The knowledge and experience gained in the development of first generation fleet command system helped China to develop more capable models later.

The first widely used shipborne fleet command system on board Chinese naval ships is H/ZBJ-1, usually abbreviated as ZBJ-1, which is first installed on board Type 052C destroyer and subsequent Type 052D destroyer. Based on the original ZBJ-1, a series of fleet command systems were developed, including ZBJ-1A and ZBJ-2. ZBJ-1A is a fleet command system designed to command and control operations of an amphibious fleet/task force, and is reported installed on Type 071 amphibious transport dock. ZBJ-2 is another development of ZBJ-1, which is designed to command and control operations of an aircraft carrier fleet/task force, which is reported installed on board Type 001 Liaoning class aircraft carrier.

== See also ==
- Chinese radars
- Naval Weaponry of the People's Liberation Army Navy
- Advanced combat direction system
- Naval Tactical Data System
- Ship Self-Defense System
