= SLNS Parakramabahu (P625) =

Sri Lanka Navy Type 053H2G class frigate

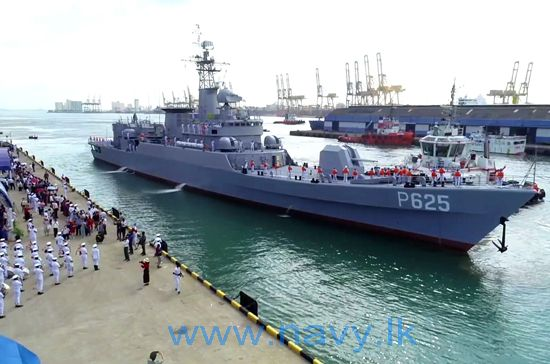
- SLNS Parakramabahu (P625)

History

China
- Name: CNS Tongling(542)
- Namesake: Tongling
- Operator: People's Liberation Army Navy
- Builder: Hudong Zhonghua Shipbuilding, Shanghai
- Launched: December 1993
- Completed: July 1994
- Commissioned: July 1994
- Decommissioned: 2015
- Fate: Gifted to Sri Lanka

History

Sri Lanka
- Name: SLNS Parakramabahu (P625)
- Operator: Sri Lanka Navy
- Acquired: 5 June 2019
- Commissioned: 22 August 2019
- Home port: SLN Dockyard
- Status: Active

General characteristics
- Type: Large patrol vessel
- Displacement: 2,300 tons
- Length: 111.7 m
- Beam: 12.4 m
- Propulsion: CODAD, 2 shaft, 2 x 18E390VA diesel @ 14,000 hp (10.4 MW) & 2x MTU diesel @ 8,840 hp (6.6 MW)
- Speed: 28 knots (52 km/h; 32 mph)
- Complement: 160 (21 officers)
- Sensors & processing systems: Type 360 Radar (SR60) Surface Search, E/F band; Type 345 Radar (MR35) fire-control, J-band; 2 × Racal RM-1290 Navigation radar, I-band
- Armament: 1 × PJ33A dual 100 mm gun (automatic); 4 × Type 76A dual-37 mm AA guns; additional armaments.
- Aviation facilities: Hangar

SLNS Parakramabahu (P625) (Sinhala: පරාක්‍රමබාහු, romanized: Parākramabāhu) is a Type 053H2G class patrol vessel of the Sri Lanka Navy. The ship is the second ship named after King Parakramabahu I, the warrior king of the medieval Sri Lankan Kingdom of Polonnaruwa. Gifted by the People's Liberation Army Navy, she was commissioned in August 2019, classed as an Advanced Offshore Patrol Vessel (equivalent to a traditional patrol frigate).

== History ==
Built in 1991, the ship was commissioned in July 1994 as Tongling (铜陵) in the People's Liberation Army Navy and served until it was decommissioned in 2015. Refitted all three ships of its class were transferred to the China Coast Guard, while Tongling was transferred to the Sri Lanka Navy in 2019. The ship retained its gun armament of a PJ33A dual 100 mm gun and four Type 76A dual-37 mm AA guns; while its missile armament of 6-cell HQ-61 surface-to-air missile system and 6-box launchers for the YJ-83 SSM have been removed. It retains the Type 343 fire-control radar of the 100 mm gun and optical fire-control for the 37mm guns.

== Operations ==
Based at the SLN Dockyard in Trincomalee under the Eastern Naval Command, there had been speculation that the ship has been facing problems and haven't had any deployments in early 2021. A Chinese team had visited the ship in March 2021. The navy confirmed that the ship was operational and the Chinese team had visited to routine maintenance and running repairs.

== See also ==
- SLNS Parakramabahu (P351)
- SLNS Gajabahu (P626)
