= Chinese frigate Dongguan =

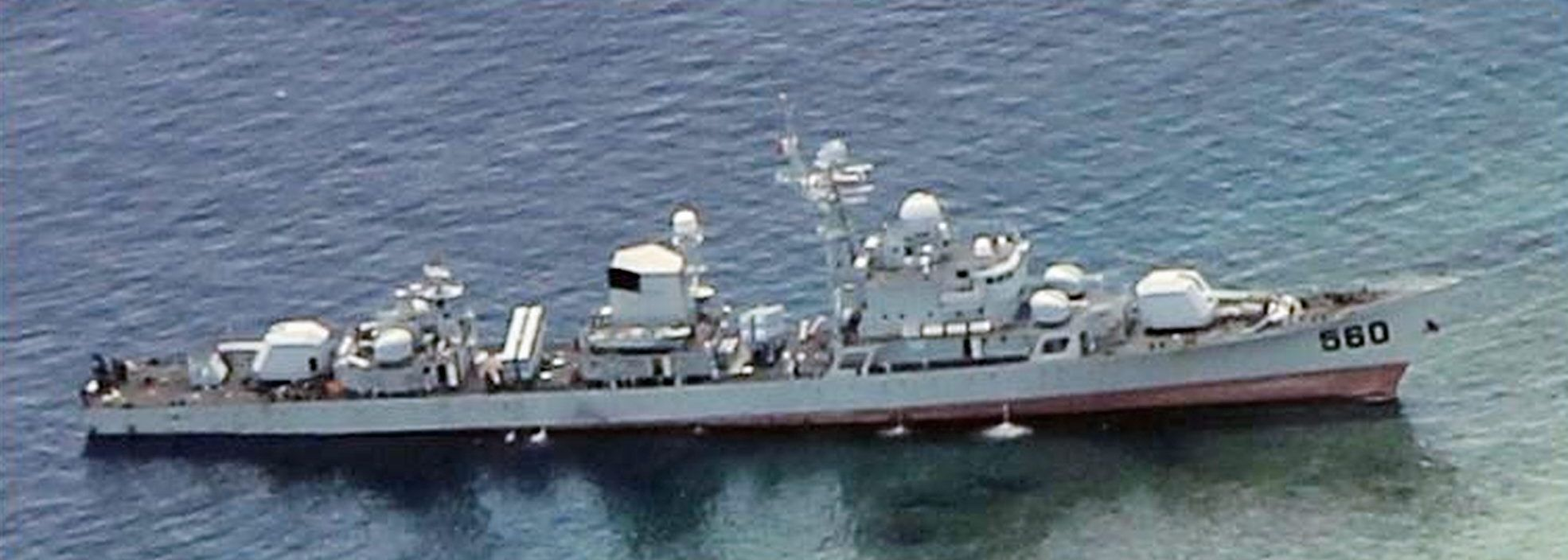
- Dongguan

History

China
- Name: Dongguan
- Namesake: Dongguan
- Builder: Hudong-Zhonghua Shipbuilding, Shanghai
- Completed: 1995
- Status: in active service, as of 2012

General characteristics
- Class & type: Type 053 frigate
- Displacement: 1,425 long tons (1,448 t) empty; 1,702 long tons (1,729 t) full
- Length: 103.22 m (338 ft 8 in)
- Beam: 10.8 m (35 ft 5 in)
- Draught: 3.05 m (10 ft 0 in)
- Propulsion: 2 × 8,000 shp (5,966 kW) 12E390VA diesel engines; 2 × 16PA6V280BTC diesel generators; 2 shafts
- Speed: 25.6 knots (47.4 km/h; 29.5 mph)
- Endurance: 15 days
- Complement: 200
- Sensors & processing systems: Type 360S 2D E/F-band air/surface search radar; Type 517A A-Band radar; Type 343G I/J-band main gun and missile targeting radar; Type 341 I-band anti-aircraft targeting radar; Racal Decca RM-1290 navigation radars; SJD-5 hull-mounted MF sonar; SJC-1B reconnaissance sonar; SJX-4 communications sonar; Type 651A IFF; ZJK-3A combat intelligence centre
- Armament: As built: 2 × triple SY-1 SSM launchers (midships); 2 × Type 79 100 mm naval guns (fore & aft); 4 × Type 76 twin 37 mm naval guns; 2 × Type 3200 6-barrel anti-submarine rocket launcher (bow); 4 × Depth charge projectors (aft); 2 × Depth charge racks (aft); After 2008 refit: 2 × quadruple YJ-83 AShM launchers; 2 × Type PJ33A 100 mm guns

Dongguan (560) is a Type 053H1G (Jianghu-V) frigate of the People's Liberation Army Navy.

The frigate is based at Mischief Reef, 76 nautical miles from Half Moon Shoal, Spratly Islands in South China Sea. On 25 February 2011 she was involved in a confrontation in Jackson Atoll with three fishing boats from the Philippines. She ran aground on Half Moon Shoal on 11 July 2012.

== See also ==
- Spratly Islands dispute
