= Chinese frigate Changsha =

Type 053 frigate

History

China
- Name: Changsha; (长沙)
- Namesake: Changsha
- Builder: Zhonghua shipyard, Shanghai
- Launched: 28 June 1975
- Commissioned: 31 December 1975
- Decommissioned: 12 June 2018
- Renamed: Jiujiang
- Refit: 2002
- Identification: Pennant number: 516
- Status: Decommissioned

General characteristics
- Class & type: Type 053H frigate
- Displacement: 1,450 standard; 1,730 full load
- Length: 103.2 m (338 ft 7 in)
- Beam: 10.7 m (35 ft 1 in)
- Draught: 3.1 m (10 ft 2 in)
- Propulsion: Two type 12 E 390V diesels; 16,000 hp (m) (11.9 MW) sustained; 2 shafts
- Speed: 26 knots (48 km/h; 30 mph)
- Range: 2,700 nmi (5,000 km; 3,100 mi) at 18 knots (33 km/h; 21 mph)
- Complement: 300 (27 officers)
- Sensors & processing systems: Radar system: Surface: Square Tie (Type 254); I-band; Air & Surface: MX 902 Eye Shield (Type 922-1); G-band; Navigation: Fin Curve (Type 352); I-band; Fire control: Wok Won director (Type 752A); Square Tie (Type 254), I-band; Echo Type 5 (Hull mounted)
- Electronic warfare & decoys: Watchdog; Radar warning
- Armament: 2 × 2 Chinese 100 mm (3.9 in)/56 calibre guns; 4 × 2 Chinese 37 mm (1.5 in)/63 calibre guns; SAM: 2 × 2 HQ-61; Depth charge: DCL-003D; Mines: Can carry up to 60; Decoys: 2 × loral Hycor SRBOC Mk 36; 6-barreled chaff launcher

Changsha (516) was a Type 053H frigate of the People's Liberation Army Navy (PLAN). The ship, renamed Jiujiang in 1981, was constructed in 1975 in the shipyards of Hudong in Shanghai. Per early reports, the ship was retired in 2017, but the official documentation shows the retirement year as 2018. The ship was the oldest serving frigate at its retirement. After its renaming, it took on a vital role as the PLA's only combat support vessel of its kind and sent minor shock waves through the military when it was decommissioned.

== Development and design ==
Type 053 frigates received the NATO reporting name Jiangdong class. From 1965 to 1967, the No. 701 Institute designed the Type 053K (Kong for air-defense), an air-defense variant of the Type 065. This met a PLAN requirement for air-defense ships to accompany the surface-warfare Type 051 destroyers. The Type 053K was originally intended to have three screws powered by a combined gas-turbine and diesel engine, with a speed of 38 knots (70 km/h; 44 mph). However, technical constraints forced the Chinese to settle for a diesel engine, powering two screws for a maximum speed of 30 knots (56 km/h; 35 mph).

Ships of the class have four SY-1s anti-ship missiles in two twin-box launchers. The armaments consisted of two single 100 mm (3.9 in) dual-purpose hand-loaded guns with fire control using a very simple stereoscopic rangefinder, limiting the gun's effectiveness to surface targets in daylight/clear weather only. The six twin 37 mm (1.5 in) short-range anti-aircraft guns were all locally controlled, severely limiting their effectiveness. The ships were equipped with Chinese SJD-3 sonar, which is a modified Soviet Tamir-11 (MG-11, with NATO reporting name Stag Hoof) hull-mounted sonar. SJD-3 has a telescoping arm instead of being fixed to the hull, so the sonar is stored in the hull when not in use. The sonar is lowered into the water several metres below the hull when deployed, thus increasing detection range by avoiding baffles generated by the hull. The ship's 11 anti-submarine armaments were limited to short-range rockets and depth charges. The ship's damage control arrangements were minimal. The Type 053Ks were armed with HQ-61 surface-to-air missiles, launched from two twin-armed launchers; these did not enter service until the mid-1980s. The 100 mm gun armament was also delayed.

In 2002, Changsha was converted to a naval gunfire support ship for amphibious assault bombardment, replacing its anti-ship missiles and anti-aircraft armament with 5 WS-1B rocket launchers with 50 tubes each.

== Construction and career ==
She was launched on 28 June 1975 at Hudong-Zhonghua Shipyard in Shanghai and commissioned on 31 December 1975.

Changsha participated in the salvage of the ocean liner Awa Maru in 1977. In November 1980, she surveyed a Soviet cruiser. On 1 August 1981, she was renamed Jiujiang. A submarine escort mission was conducted in 1982 by Changsha. A Soviet 056 frigate was surveyed in October 1984.

In March 1996, a joint naval exercise was conducted in the Taiwan Strait.

On 26 June 2007, she made a goodwill visit to Jiujiang City and presented a model of the ship to the Jiujiang Municipal Government. The Jiujiang Municipal Government also awarded officers and soldiers with the certificate of Jiujiang Honorary Citizen.

In August 2011, Liao Kaibo, then Deputy Mayor of Jiujiang Municipal Government, visited the ship in Fujian. In January 2012, the then Deputy Mayor of Jiujiang Municipal Government Yang Jian led the heads of the Civil Affairs Bureau, Shuangyong Office, and other departments to visit the officers and soldiers of the ship in Fujian. Beginning in September 2012, she patrolled the waters near Pingtan. In February 2013, Feng Jing, then deputy secretary of the Jiujiang Municipal Party Committee, led a Jiujiang City Supporting Army delegation to visit the ship.

On 31 July 2015, the Jiujiang Civil Affairs Bureau staff and the Municipal Shuangyou Office visited the officers and soldiers of the ship in Fujian on the eve of the August, 1st Army Day. In January 2016, Shi Rongguo, Deputy Mayor of Jiujiang City, led the heads of the Municipal Government Office, Civil Affairs Bureau, Double Support Office, and other departmental/model representatives of the Double Support to visit Fujian's navy officers and soldiers stationed at the Ningde Military Port.

She was decommissioned on 12 June 2018.
