= UMS Maha Bandula =

Type 053 frigate

History

China
- Name: Anshun; (安顺)
- Namesake: Anshun
- Builder: Zhonghua shipyard, Shanghai
- Launched: 10 March 1986
- Commissioned: 27 June 1986
- Decommissioned: March 2012
- Identification: Pennant number: 554
- Fate: Sold to Myanmar Navy in 2012

History

Myanmar
- Name: Maha Bandula
- Namesake: Maha Bandula
- Acquired: 2012
- Commissioned: 2012
- Identification: Pennant number: F23
- Status: Active

General characteristics
- Class & type: Type 053H1 frigate
- Displacement: 1,450 standard; 1,730 full load
- Length: 103.2 m (339 ft)
- Beam: 10.7 m (35 ft)
- Draught: 3.1 m (10 ft)
- Propulsion: Two type 12 E 390V diesels; 16,000 hp (m) (11.9MW) sustained; 2 shafts
- Speed: 26 knots
- Range: 2,700 nmi (5,000 km; 3,100 mi) at 18 knots (33 km/h; 21 mph)
- Complement: 300 (27 officers)
- Sensors & processing systems: Radar System: Surface: Square Tie (Type 254); I-band; Air & Surface: MX 902 Eye Shield (Type 922-1); G-band; Navigation: Fin Curve (Type 352); I-band; Fire Control: Wok Won director (Type 752A); Square Tie (Type 254), I-band; Echo Type 5 (Hull Mounted)
- Electronic warfare & decoys: Watchdog; Radar warning
- Armament: 2 × Chinese 3.9 in (100 mm) /56 (twin) guns; 8 × Chinese 37 mm /63 (6 twin) guns; AShM: 2 × 4 C-802; 2 × RBU-1200 5-tubed fixed launchers; Depth Charge: DCL-003D; Mines: Can carry up to 60; Decoys: 2 × loral Hycor SRBOC Mk 36; 6-barreled chaff launcher

Anshun (554) was a Type 053 frigate of the People's Liberation Army Navy. She was sold to the Myanmar Navy and renamed Maha Bandula.

== Development and design ==
The class has four anti-ship SY-1s in two twin-box launchers, and armaments consisted of two single 100 mm dual-purpose hand-loaded guns with fire control by a very simple stereoscopic rangefinder, limiting the guns to effective fire against surface targets in daylight/clear weather only. The six twin 37 mm short-range anti-aircraft guns were all locally controlled, severely limiting their effectiveness. These ships are equipped with Chinese SJD-3 sonar, which is a modification of Soviet Tamir-11 (MG-11, with NATO reporting name Stag Hoof) hull mounted sonar: instead of being fixed to the hull, SJD-3 has a telescoping arm, so when not in use, the sonar is stored in the hull, and when deployed, the sonar is lowered into water several meter below the hull, thus increased detection range by avoiding baffles generated by the hull. Anti-submarine armament was limited to short-range rockets and depth charges. Damage control arrangements were minimal.

Type 053H was improved with newer electronics, engine, and replenishment equipment. The sonar for Jianghu-II is SJD-5, which is a Chinese development of Soviet Tamir-11, with transistors replacing vacuum tubes in the original Soviet MG-11, armed with six SY-2 in two triple-box launchers.

== Construction and career ==
She was launched on 10 March 1986 at Hudong-Zhonghua Shipyard in Shanghai and commissioned on 27 June 1986.

In March 2012, Anshun was decommissioned and sold to Myanmar Navy and renamed UMS Maha Bandula. On 11 until 14 March of the same month, UMS Maha Bandula and UMS Maha Thiha Thura carrying 246 sailors and officers was docked in Tiên Sa Seaport, Da Nang.
