= Chinese frigate Huaiyin =

Type 053 frigate

Coordinates: 30.5809580°N 114.2968670°E

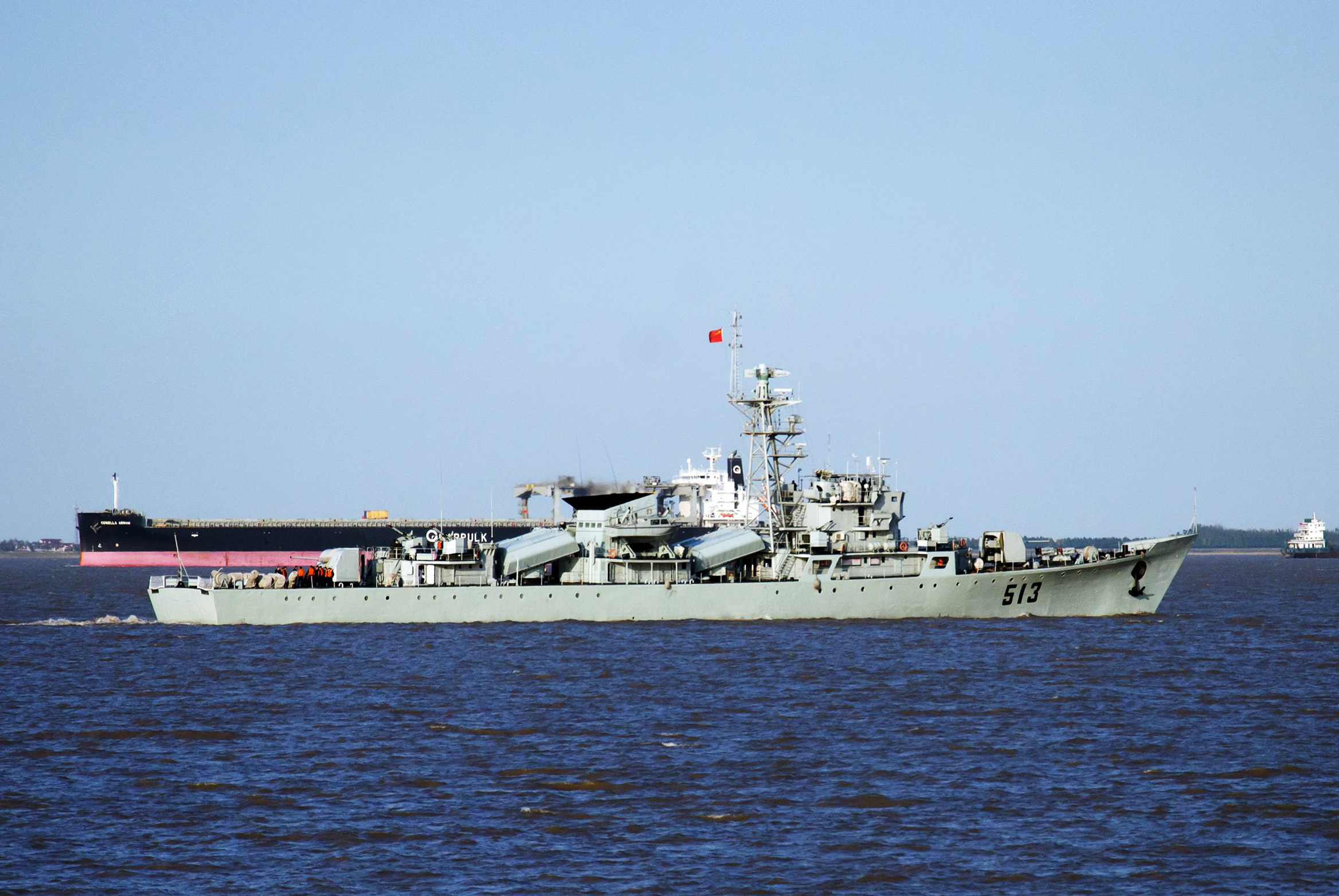
- Huai'an on 19 October 2012

History

China
- Name: Huaiyin; (淮阴)
- Namesake: Huaiyin
- Builder: Zhonghua shipyard, Shanghai
- Launched: 19 April 1977
- Commissioned: 31 December 1977
- Decommissioned: 20 May 2013
- Renamed: Huai'an
- Identification: Pennant number: 513
- Status: Museum ship at Wuhan Science and Technology Museum, Wuhan

General characteristics
- Class & type: Type 053H frigate
- Displacement: 1,450 standard; 1,730 full load
- Length: 103.2 m (339 ft)
- Beam: 10.7 m (35 ft)
- Draft: 3.1 m (10 ft)
- Propulsion: Two type 12 E 390V diesels; 16,000 hp (m) (11.9MW) sustained; 2 shafts
- Speed: 26 knots
- Range: 2,700 nmi (5,000 km; 3,100 mi) at 18 knots (33 km/h; 21 mph)
- Complement: 300 (27 officers)
- Sensors & processing systems: Radar System: Surface: Square Tie (Type 254); I-band; Air & Surface: MX 902 Eye Shield (Type 922-1); G-band; Navigation: Fin Curve (Type 352); I-band; Fire Control: Wok Won director (Type 752A); Square Tie (Type 254), I-band; Echo Type 5 (Hull Mounted)
- Electronic warfare & decoys: Watchdog; Radar warning
- Armament: 2 × 2 Chinese 3.9 in (100 mm) /56 (twin) guns; 4 × 2 Chinese 37 mm /63 (6 twin) guns; SAM: 2 × 2 HQ-61; Depth Charge: DCL-003D; Mines: Can carry up to 60; Decoys: 2 × loral Hycor SRBOC Mk 36; 6-barreled chaff launcher

Huaiyin (513) was a Type 053H frigate of the People's Liberation Army Navy. She was renamed Huai'an in 2006.

== Development and design ==
The class have four anti-ship SY-1s in two twin-box launchers, armaments consisted to two single 100mm dual-purpose hand-loaded guns with fire control by a very simple stereoscopic rangefinder, limiting the guns to effective fire against surface targets in daylight/clear weather only. The six twin 37mm short-range anti-aircraft guns were all locally controlled, severely limiting their effectiveness. These ships are equipped with Chinese SJD-3 sonar, which is modification of Soviet Tamir-11 (MG-11, with NATO reporting name Stag Hoof) hull mounted sonar: instead of being fixed to the hull, SJD-3 has a telescoping arm, so when not in use, the sonar is stored in the hull, and when deployed, the sonar is lowered into water several meter below the hull, thus increased detection range by avoiding baffles generated by the hull. 11 Anti-submarine armament was limited to short-range rockets and depth charges. Damage control arrangements were minimal.

From 1965 to 1967, the No. 701 Institute designed the Type 053K (Kong for air-defence), an air-defence variant of the Type 065. This met a PLAN requirement for air-defence ships to accompany the surface-warfare Type 051 destroyers. The Type 053K was originally intended to have three screws powered by a combined gas-turbine and diesel engine, with a speed of 38 knots. However, technical constraints forced the Chinese to settle for a diesel engine, powering two screws for a maximum speed of 30 knots.

The Type 053Ks were armed with HQ-61 surface-to-air missiles, launched from two twin-armed launchers; these did not enter service until the mid-1980s. The 100 mm. gun armament was also delayed. This class received NATO reporting name as Jiangdong class.

== Construction and career ==
She was launched on 19 April 1977 at Hudong-Zhonghua Shipyard in Shanghai and commissioned on 31 December 1977.

On 20 December 2006, she was renamed to Huai'an.

She was decommissioned on 20 May 2013 and currently she sits at Wuhan Science and Technology Museum, Wuhan as a museum ship.
