= BNS Abu Bakr =

Two ships of Bangladesh Navy carried the name BNS Abu Bakr or Abu Bakar:

- BNS Abu Bakr (1982), a Leopard-class frigate transferred from the Royal Navy.
- BNS Abu Bakr (2014), a Type 053H2 (Jianghu-III) frigate transferred from the People's Liberation Army Navy.
