= BNS Osman =

Guided missile frigate of the Bangladesh Navy

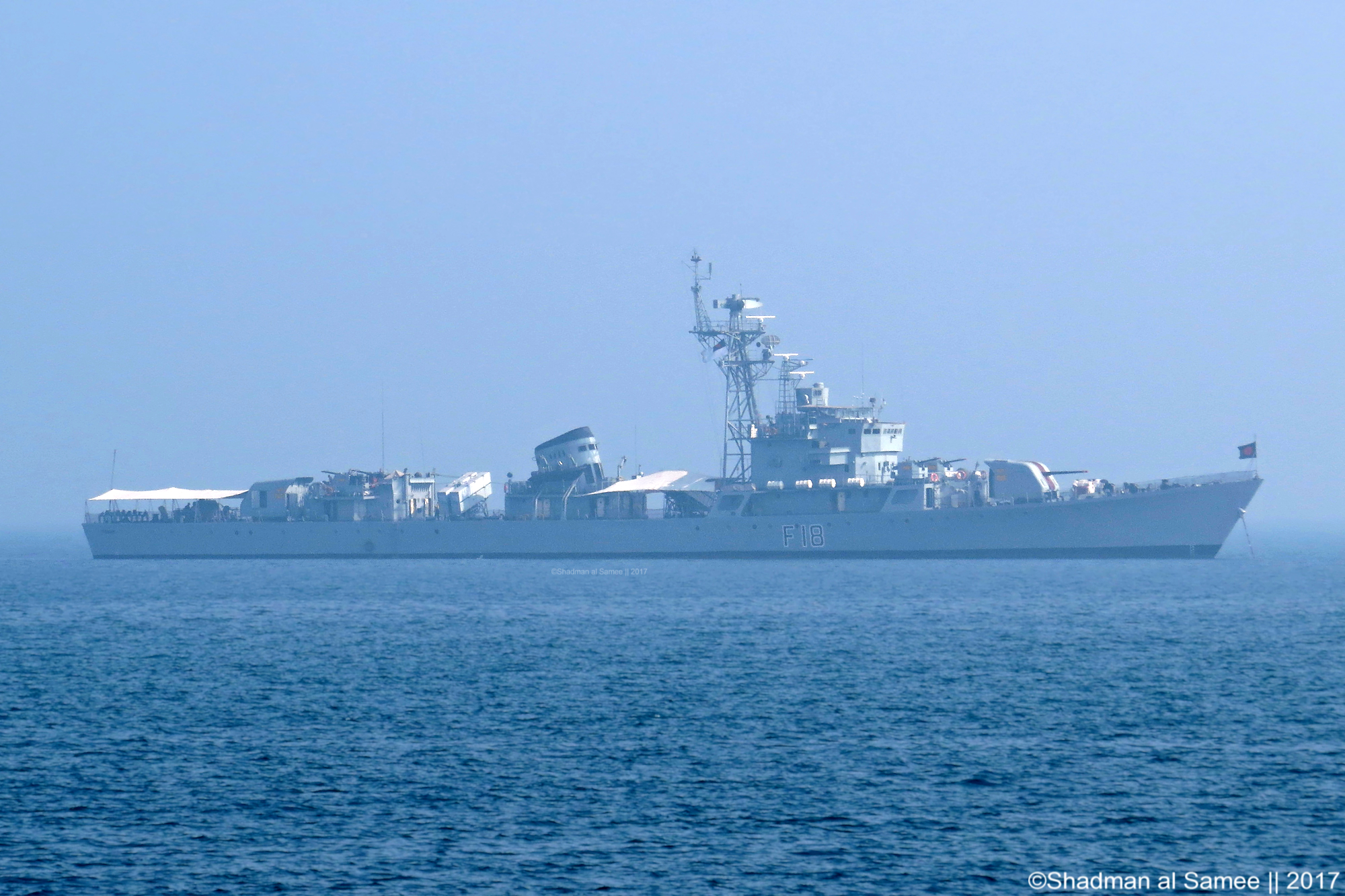
- BNS Osman (F18)

History

Bangladesh
- Name: BNS Osman
- Namesake: Osman Gazi
- Builder: Hudong Shipyard, Shanghai
- Laid down: 1986
- Launched: 14 July 1987
- Acquired: 1989
- Commissioned: 4 November 1989
- Decommissioned: 2020
- In service: 1989–2020
- Reclassified: 053H1/Jianghu-II (Mod.)
- Home port: Chattogram
- Identification: Pennant number: F 18
- Honours and awards: National Standard of Bangladesh
- Fate: Scrapped

General characteristics
- Class & type: Modified Type 053H frigate
- Displacement: 1,450 standard; 1,730 full load
- Length: 103.2 m (339 ft)
- Beam: 10.7 m (35 ft)
- Draught: 3.1 m (10 ft)
- Propulsion: Two type 12 E 390V diesels; 16,000 hp (m) (11.9MW) sustained; 2 shafts
- Speed: 26 knots
- Range: 2,700 nmi (5,000 km; 3,100 mi) at 18 knots (33 km/h; 21 mph)
- Complement: 160 (27 officers)
- Sensors & processing systems: Radar System: Surface: Square Tie (Type 254); I-band; Air & Surface: MX 902 Eye Shield (Type 922-1); G-band; Navigation: Fin Curve (Type 352); I-band; Fire Control: Wok Won director (Type 752A); Square Tie (Type 254), I-band; Echo Type 5 (Hull Mounted)
- Electronic warfare & decoys: Watchdog; Radar warning
- Armament: 2 × Chinese 3.9 in (100 mm) /56 (twin) guns; 8 × Chinese 37 mm /63 (6 twin) guns; AShM: 2 × 4 C-802; 2 × RBU-1200 5-tubed fixed launchers; Depth Charge: DCL-003D; Mines: Can carry up to 60; Decoys: 2 × loral Hycor SRBOC Mk 36; 6-barreled chaff launcher

BNS Osman was a modified Type 053H frigate of the Bangladesh Navy, bought in 1988 from China. She was the first guided missile frigate to enter service with the Bangladesh Navy.It was named in honor of the third Rashidun Caliph, Hazrat Osman (RA).

== Design ==
Powered by two 8,000 horsepower (6,000 kW) type 12 E 390V diesel engines that drive two propellers, Osman had a maximum speed of 26 knots (48 km/h; 30 mph). She had a range of 2,700 nautical miles (5,000 km; 3,100 mi) at 18 knots (33 km/h; 21 mph).

=== Armament ===
The ship's primary armament consisted of eight C-802 anti-ship missiles. Her secondary armament consisted of two twin 100 mm guns, mounted on the bow and stern. Anti-aircraft armament consisted of four twin 37 mm guns. For anti-submarine warfare, she was equipped with two RBU-1200 anti-submarine rocket launchers and two BMB-2 depth charge mortars. She could carry up to 60 mines.

=== Electronics ===
Osman was equipped with one MX 902 radar for air and surface search and one Type 352 Square Tie radar for surface search and fire control. One Type 352 radar was present for navigational purpose. I band Type 752A and Type 254 radar was present on the ship as fire control radar for different weapons. An Echo Type 5 hull mounted sonar was there for underwater detection.

== History ==
The Type 053H1 Frigate Osman was previously known as Xiangtan, which served with People's Liberation Army Navy (PLAN) in South Sea Fleet. The ship was commissioned in PLAN on 20 December 1987. In PLAN service, this ship participated in the Johnson South Reef Skirmish against the Vietnamese Navy on 14 March 1988 and sank the Vietnamese transport ship HQ-605. In 1989 the ship was sold to the Bangladesh Navy. She was commissioned into the Bangladesh Navy as Osman on 4 November 1989. She is the first guided missile frigate to enter in service with the Bangladesh Navy.

== Career ==
Osman was based at Chattogram, serving with the Commodore Commanding BN Flotilla (COMBAN). About 250 personnel served aboard Osman, with most living on board. She was the first frigate of Bangladesh Navy who test fired C-802A missile in Bay of Bengal on 12 May 2008, which successfully hit the target. The ship had gone through major upgrades which included replacement of propulsion system, new missile launching platforms and an addition of a combat data link.

Osman was deployed to Lebanon with the UN mission United Nations Interim Force in Lebanon (UNIFIL) from 17 May 2010 to 14 June 2014. She returned to Bangladesh on 11 August 2014. On her way, she visited the Port of Salalah and Port Sultan Qaboos of Oman, Port of Colombo of Sri Lanka and Mumbai and Chennai Port of India on a goodwill mission.

On 11 October 2014, Osman was awarded the title of National Standard in recognition of the ship's quarter century of outstanding service in the Bangladesh Navy at home and abroad.

After serving the Bangladesh Navy for around 31 years, the ship was decommissioned in 2020. Later on, she was scrapped.

== See also ==
- List of historic ships of the Bangladesh Navy
