= Chinese frigate Xiamen =

Type 053 frigate

Coordinates: 32.2453187°N 119.8916866°E

History

China
- Name: Xiamen; (厦门)
- Namesake: Xiamen
- Builder: Zhonghua shipyard, Shanghai
- Launched: 27 October 1975
- Commissioned: 31 December 1975
- Decommissioned: August 2013
- Identification: Pennant number: 515
- Fate: Museum ship at Taizhou Naval Museum, Taizhou

General characteristics
- Class & type: Type 053H frigate
- Displacement: 1,450 standard; 1,730 full load
- Length: 103.2 m (339 ft)
- Beam: 10.7 m (35 ft)
- Draft: 3.1 m (10 ft)
- Propulsion: Two type 12 E 390V diesels; 16,000 hp (m) (11.9MW) sustained; 2 shafts
- Speed: 26 knots
- Range: 2,700 nmi (5,000 km; 3,100 mi) at 18 knots (33 km/h; 21 mph)
- Complement: 300 (27 officers)
- Sensors & processing systems: Radar System: Surface: Square Tie (Type 254); I-band; Air & Surface: MX 902 Eye Shield (Type 922-1); G-band; Navigation: Fin Curve (Type 352); I-band; Fire Control: Wok Won director (Type 752A); Square Tie (Type 254), I-band; Echo Type 5 (Hull Mounted)
- Electronic warfare & decoys: Watchdog; Radar warning
- Armament: 2 × Chinese 3.9 in (100 mm) /56 (twin) guns; 8 × Chinese 37 mm /63 (6 twin) guns; AShM: 2 × 4 C-802; 2 × RBU-1200 5-tubed fixed launchers; Depth Charge: DCL-003D; Mines: Can carry up to 60; Decoys: 2 × loral Hycor SRBOC Mk 36; 6-barreled chaff launcher

Xiamen (515) was a Type 053 frigate of the People's Liberation Army Navy.

== Development and design ==
The PLAN retired many older frigates in the 1970s, and the No. 701 Institute developed the Type 053H (Hai for anti-ship) as a replacement. The initial design was armed with four SY-1 anti-ship missiles in two twin-missile box launchers, two single 100 mm. guns, six twin 37mm guns, depth charges and short-range ASW rockets. The Type 053H received the NATO codename Jianghu-I. The first was constructed by the Hudong Shipyard and entered service in the mid-1970s. At least a dozen were built and entered service with the PLAN East Sea Fleet.

The Type 053H was improved in four successive subclasses, receiving NATO codenames Jianghu-II through Jianghu-V. The Type 053Hs were succeeded by the PLAN's first multirole frigates, the Type 053H2G and Type 053H3 frigates.

== Construction and career ==
She was launched on 27 October 1975 at Hudong-Zhonghua Shipyard in Shanghai and commissioned on 31 December 1975.

She was decommissioned in August 2013 and currently she lies at Taizhou Naval Museum, Taizhou as a museum ship near the Taizhou Yangtze River Bridge.
