= Type 342 Radar =

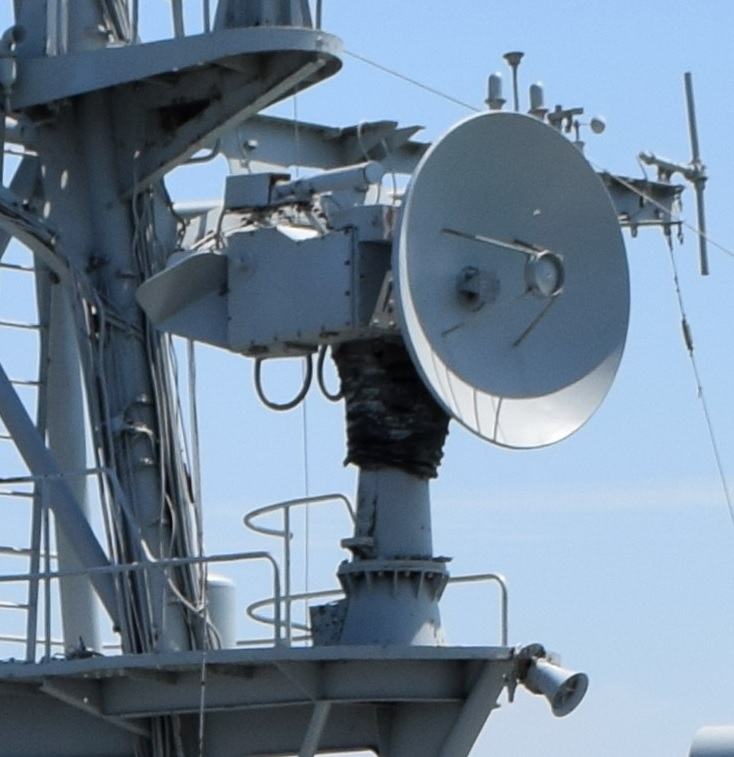

Type 342 radar is a Chinese fire control radar for HQ-61 SAM, and since has been retired from active service from Chinese navy (PLAN) when HQ-61 SAM is replaced by more advanced SAM systems.

Type 342 is a centimeter wave, mono-pulse tracking radar for HQ-61 SAM. The radar was installed on Type 053K Jiangdong class frigate. Each radar is capable of engage a single target, and a maximum of three Type 342 radars can be installed on Type 053K frigate. Type 342 has been replaced by more advanced Type 345, as in the case onboard Type 053H2G frigate.

== See also ==
- Chinese radars
- Naval Weaponry of the People's Liberation Army Navy
