= Type 053 frigate =

Family of Chinese frigates

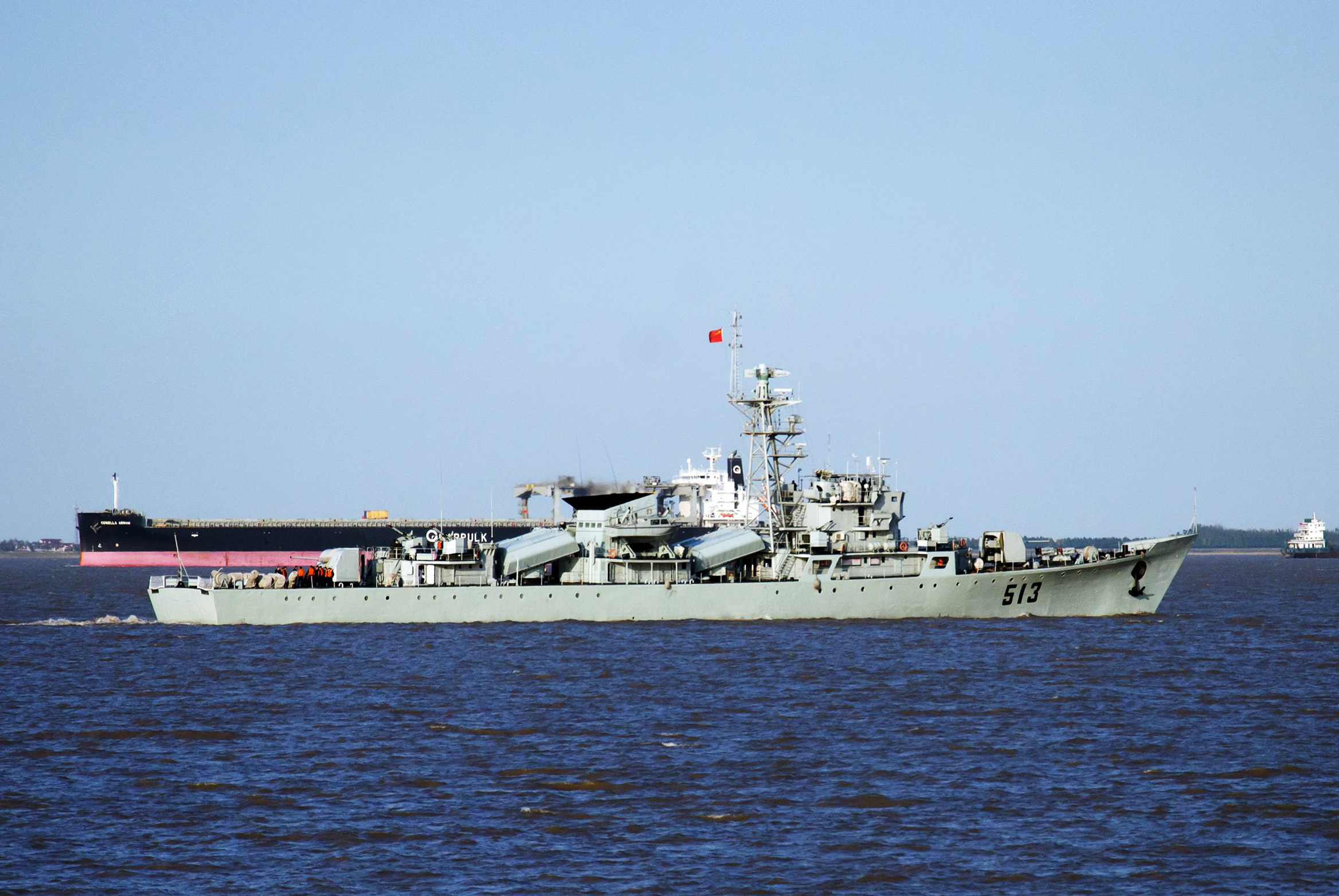
- Type 053H frigate Huai'an in Shanghai, 2012

Class overview
- Builders: Hudong Shipyard; Jiangnan Shipyard
- Operators: People's Liberation Army Navy Surface Force; Royal Thai Navy; Bangladesh Navy; Egyptian Navy; Myanmar Navy
- Preceded by: Type 065 frigate (modified Riga-class design)
- Succeeded by: Type 053H2G frigate in People's Liberation Army Navy; Naresuan class in Royal Thai Navy
- Subclasses: Type 053H; Type 053H1; Type 053H2; Type 053H1Q; Type 053H1G; Type 053K; Najim al Zafir (Egyptian Navy Type 053H); Chao Phraya (Royal Thai Navy Type 053H2)
- In service: 1974
- Completed: 14 Type 053H; 9 Type 053H1; 3 Type 053H2; 1 Type 053H1Q; 6 Type 053H1G; 2 Type 053K; 4 Chao Phraya (Royal Thai Navy Type 053H2)
- Active: China: 0; Bangladesh: 2 (Type 053H2); Thailand: 4 (Type 053H2); Myanmar: 2 (Type 053H1); Egypt: 0; (Excluding all reclassified Coast Guard and training ships)
- Retired: 28
- Preserved: 8

General characteristics
- Type: Frigate
- Displacement: 1,700 to 2,000 tons
- Length: 103 to 112 m
- Beam: 10 to 12 m
- Draught: 3 to 4 m
- Propulsion: 2 to 4 diesel engines; 16,000 to 22,000 shp
- Speed: 32 knots (59 km/h)
- Range: 7408km (4000nm)
- Complement: 160 to 200
- Sensors & processing systems: Type 354 Radar (Eye Shield) 2D air/surface search, I-band; Type 352 Radar (Square Tie) surface search fire-control, I-band; Type 343 (Wasp Head) fire control radar for main gun, G/H-band; Type 341 fire control radar for dual Type 76 twin 37 mm AA gun; 2 x Racal RM-1290 navigation radars, I-band
- Armament: Many variations amongst sub-classes
- Aircraft carried: Some carry 1 helicopter: Harbin Z-9C

The Type 053 is a family of Chinese frigates that served with the People's Liberation Army Navy Surface Force, and a small number of foreign navies.

Nomenclature for Chinese warships was temporarily changed during the Cultural Revolution, and some subclasses gained different NATO reporting names.

== Nomenclature ==
The naming of the Type 053/Type 6601/Type 065 frigates reflected contemporary Chinese political turmoil. The PLAN originally named major surface combatants after geographical areas in China, but this practice was abolished during the Cultural Revolution. During that period, most of the third batch of Type 065s were either not named or had their names stripped. Ships were referred to only by their hull numbers.

The naming of ships resumed in the latter half of the 1980s. By that time the Type 065s were nearing retirement, and the traditional geographic names were given to newer ships. For example, Jinan was allocated to a Type 051 destroyer. When the older Type 053/Type 6601/Type 065 were renamed, none received the same one they had held before.

== History ==
=== Replicating the Riga and the Type 065 ===
In the 1950s, the Soviets provided China with four kits for Riga-class frigates and four completed Gnevny-class destroyers. These entered PLAN service as the Type 01 Chengdu class and the Type 07 Anshan class, respectively. The Riga kits were assembled by the Huangpu Shipyard in Guangzhou, and the Hudong Shipyard in Shanghai, from 1955 to 1958. These ships formed the PLAN's backbone in the 1950s and 1960s.

Following the Sino-Soviet split and the withdrawal of Soviet aid, the Wuhan-based No. 701 Institute began reverse-engineering the Type 01 in 1962. The result was the Type 065. It was based on the Riga class hull, with the flush deck replaced by a long forecastle. This modification was needed to accommodate a large medium-speed diesel powerplant; the civilian diesel was a substitute for the Riga class' compact high-pressure steam turbine powerplant that the Chinese were unable to replicate. The first Type 065, Haikou (529), was laid down at Huangpu in August 1964 and commissioned by August 1966.

=== Type 053K air-defence frigate ===
From 1965 to 1967, the No. 701 Institute designed the Type 053K (Kong for air-defence), an air-defence variant of the Type 065. This met a PLAN requirement for air-defence ships to accompany the surface-warfare Type 051 destroyers. The Type 053K was originally intended to have three screws powered by a combined gas-turbine and diesel engine, with a speed of 38 knots. Technical constraints forced the Chinese to settle for a diesel engine, powering two screws for a maximum speed of 30 knots.

The Type 053Ks were armed with HQ-61 surface-to-air missiles, launched from two twin-armed launchers. These entered service in the mid-1980s. The 100 mm. gun armament was also delayed. This class received NATO reporting name as Jiangdong class.

Only two Type 053Ks were completed, possibly due to unsatisfactory performance and the long development time for their intended armament. Yingtan (531) was laid down in 1970 and commissioned in 1977, and followed by Zhongdong (532). Both ships were withdrawn from service in 1992, with one scrapped in 1994 and the other preserved as a museum ship.

=== Type 053H surface-warfare frigate ===
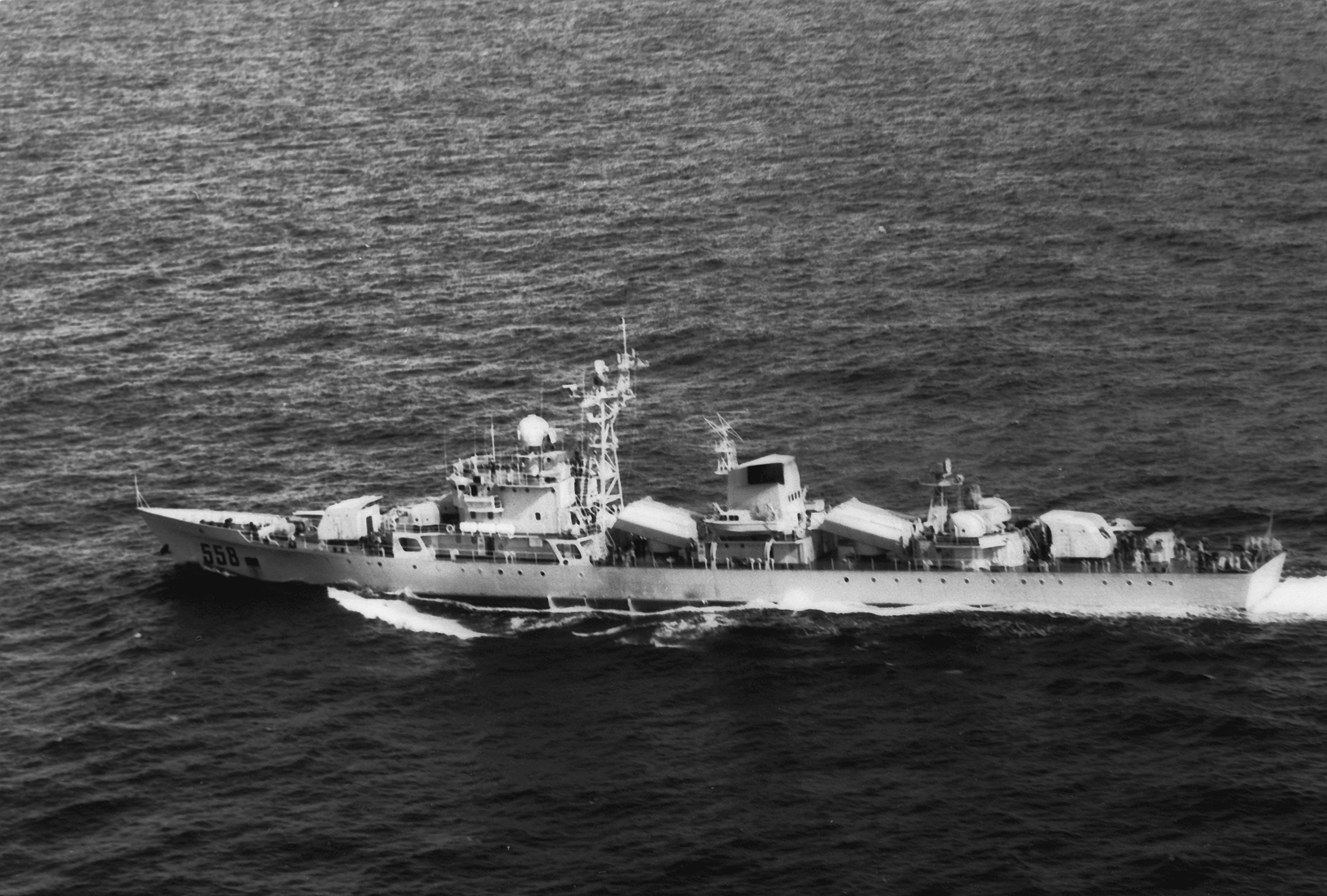
Type 053H1G Zigong (558) was armed with four SY-1 anti-ship missiles

The PLAN retired many older frigates in the 1970s, and the No. 701 Institute developed the Type 053H (Hai for anti-ship) as a replacement. The initial design was armed with four SY-1 anti-ship missiles in two twin-missile box launchers, two single 100 mm. guns, six twin 37mm guns, depth charges and short-range ASW rockets.

The Type 053H received the NATO codename Jianghu-I. The first was constructed by the Hudong Shipyard and entered service in the mid-1970s. At least a dozen were built and entered service with the PLAN East Sea Fleet.

The Type 053H was improved in four successive subclasses, receiving NATO codenames Jianghu-II through Jianghu-V. The Type 053Hs were succeeded by the PLAN's first multirole frigates, the Type 053H2G and Type 053H3 frigates.

=== Type 053H2 surface-warfare frigate ===
The Type 053H2, NATO codename Jianghu-III, is an improved version of Type 053H1 frigates. Between 1985 and 1992, Hudong Shipyard built seven hulls for the People's Liberation Army Navy (three ships) and Royal Thai Navy (four ships).

In 2013, two of PLAN Type 053H2 frigates were transferred to Bangladesh Navy. Basically, Type 053H2 is an anti-surface warfare (ASuW) frigate for the littoral environment featuring a sophisticated combat management system and enhanced electronic warfare and countermeasures capabilities.

==== Foreign sales ====
The Chinese sold the Type 053H, and derivatives to foreign navies. One refurbished Type 053H1 and two Type 053H2 was sold to the Bangladesh Navy. Two refurbished Type 053Hs went to the Egyptian Navy. Sonars for these ships are Echo Type 5, a development of EH-5 sonar used on Type 053H2's, adopting LSIC technology. The PLAN added Type 343 fire control radar for the gun. They mounted Silkworm anti-ship missiles.

In the early-1990s, the Royal Thai Navy received four new Type 053HTs, based on the then-latest Type 053H2. Each cost ฿2 billion. Two were modified with rear helicopter decks. The sonar on these ships is SJD-5A, a further development of Echo Type 5 sonars on the same class of ships sold to Egyptian and Bangladesh navies, with VLSIC replacing LSIC.

In the mid-1990s, the Thai Navy again ordered two enlarged Type 053 hulls as the F25T Naresuan-class frigates. The general designer of F25T frigate is Mr. Zhu Yingfu (朱英富). The F25Ts were fitted with Western engines and armament, and their construction was supervised by technical advisers from the German ship building industry. Sonars on these F25Ts are SO-7H, which is the Chinese version of French DUBA25.

=== Transfers to the Coast Guard ===
In 2007, the Type 053H frigates "509" and "510" were transferred to the China Coast Guard and refitted as Ocean Patrol Vehicles "1002" and "1003". The superstructure was heavily modified. Armament was reduced to a small cannon forward and heavy machine guns; some of freed space was used to stow small patrol boats and add crew quarters.

=== Transfers to Bangladesh Navy ===
One used Type 053H1 frigate was sold to the Bangladesh Navy as BNS Osman in 1989. She was the first guided missile frigate to enter in service with the Bangladesh Navy. In 2013, two Type 053H2 frigates were transferred to Bangladesh Navy as BNS Abu Bakr and BNS Ali Haider respectively.

=== Transfers to Myanmar ===
In 2012, two Type 053H1 frigates, Anshun (FFG 554) and Jishou (FFG 557) were transferred to Myanmar Navy as UMS Mahar Bandoola (F-21) and UMS Mahar Thiha Thura (F-23) respectively.

=== Incidents ===
On 11 July 2012, a Type 0531G ship, Dongguan (560), ran aground on a shoal off the coast of the Philippines. The area where the incident occurred, known as Half Moon Shoal (Hasa Hasa Shoal in the Philippines) in the Spratly Islands is 60 miles west of Rizal, Palawan. By 15 July the ship had been refloated and was returning to port with no casualty and only minor damage. Confrontations over territorial disputes in the South China Sea, and particularly the disputed status of the Spratly Islands, have become more frequent in recent years, and caused noticeable friction at the 2012 ASEAN summit in Phnom Penh that was taking place at the same time as the incident.

== Versions ==
- Type 6601

Four ships were assembled in China from Soviet-supplied kits of Riga-class frigates. Slightly more heavily armed than the Soviet Riga class (Project 50) it is based on, in that the two twin 25 mm gun mounts on the original Riga class were replaced by a second pair of twin 37 mm gun mounts in the Chengdu class. The original RBU-2500 ASW launchers on the original Riga class were replaced by RBU-1200 on Type 6601. All four units were converted to Type 01 in the early 1970s.

- Type 01

By the early 1970s, Type 6601 class went through mid-life upgrade with their torpedo tubes replaced by a twin launcher for SY-1 anti-ship missiles. Although redesignated as Type 01, these ships were still called Chengdu class. Retired in the 1980s.

- Type 065 (NATO codename Jiangnan)

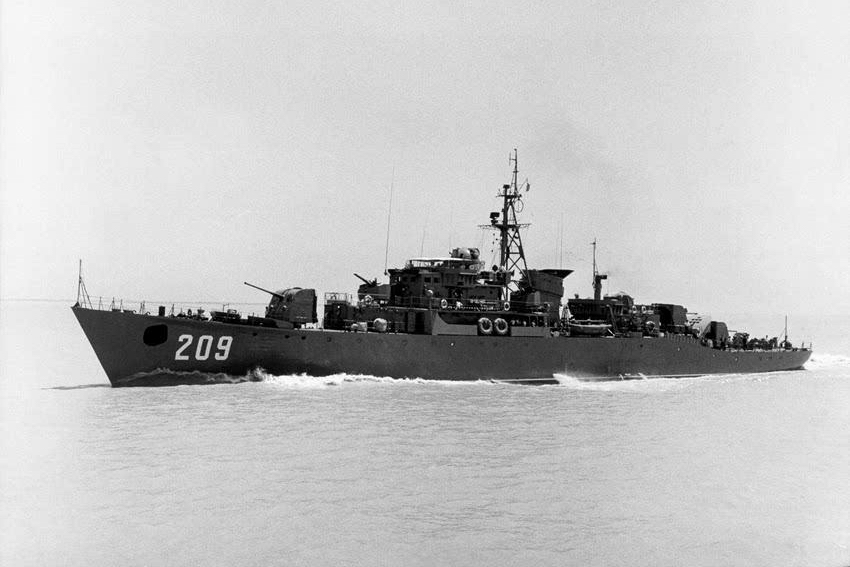
Type 065 frigate Haikou

Based on the Type 6601/01. The design was first started in Dec 1962 by the 701st Institute at Wuhan, and the construction begun in Aug 1964, with the first ship entering service in August 1966. These five ships were powered by modified civilian diesel engine rather than military-grade steam turbines. Main guns were mounted one forward and two aft, instead of two forward and one aft on the Riga class. Completely withdrawn from active duty in the 1980s, but remained as training, museum, and public relations ships. The ships remain on the PLAN's roster, and their upkeep at museums is provided by the PLAN.

- Type 053K (NATO codename Jiangdong)

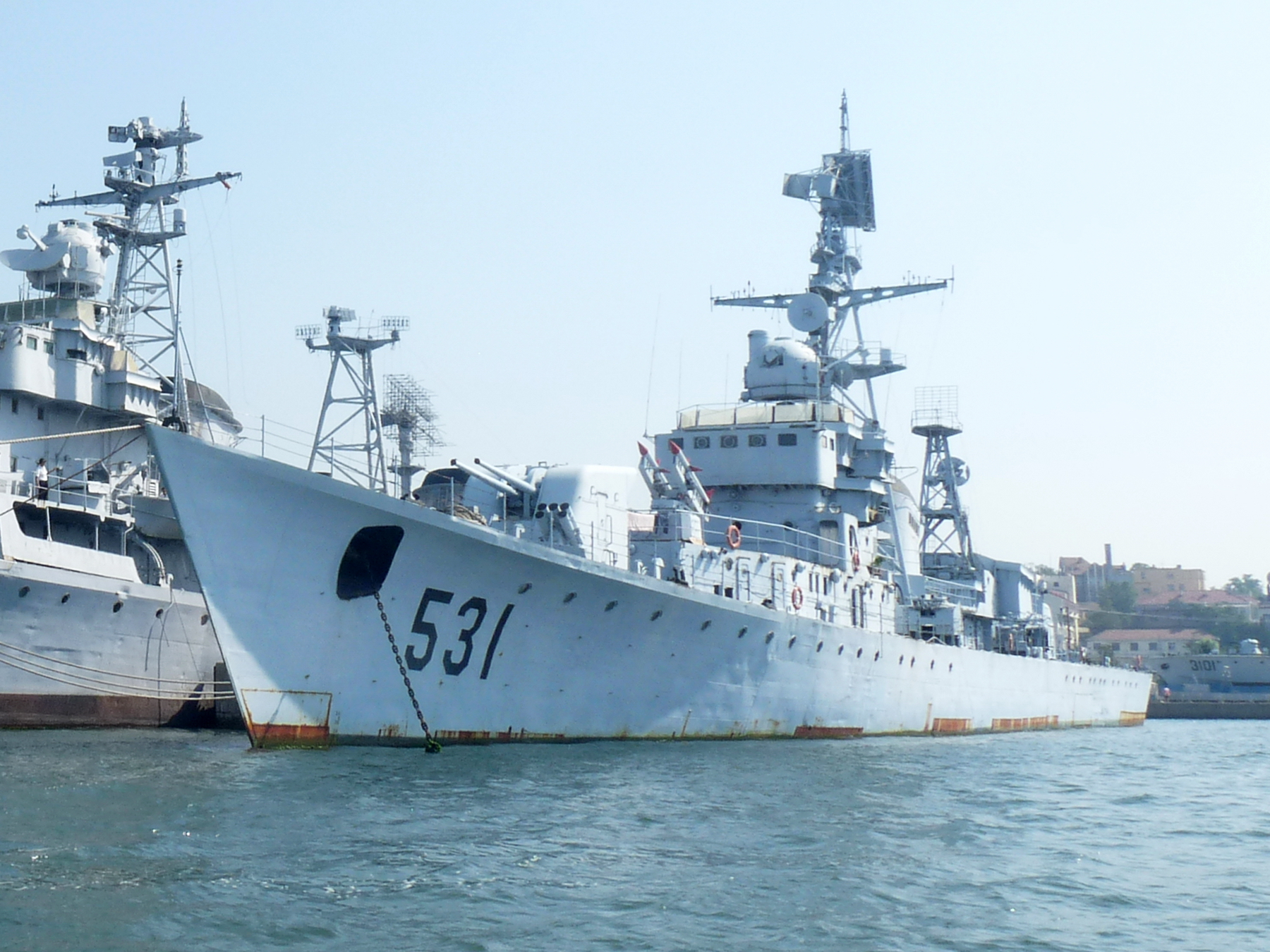
Type 053K frigate Yingtan

Air-defense frigate armed with two twin-armed HQ-61 surface-to-air missile (SAM) launchers. Only two built, and retired from active service in the early 1990s. Yingtan (531) is docked at a museum in Qingdao; the PLAN retains ownership and provides upkeep, while Zhongdong (532) was scrapped.

- Type 053H (NATO codename Jianghu-I)

"Mass production" surface warfare frigate whose design and equipment were hopelessly outdated before the first ship even completed. The only nod to modernity was the four anti-ship SY-1s in two twin-box launchers. Remaining armament consisted to two single 100mm dual-purpose hand-loaded guns with fire control by a very simple stereoscopic rangefinder, limiting the guns to effective fire against surface targets in daylight/clear weather only. The six twin 37mm short-range anti-aircraft guns were all locally controlled, severely limiting their effectiveness. These ships are equipped with Chinese SJD-3 sonar, which is modification of Soviet Tamir-11 (MG-11, with NATO reporting name Stag Hoof) hull mounted sonar: instead of being fixed to the hull, SJD-3 has a telescoping arm, so when not in use, the sonar is stored in the hull, and when deployed, the sonar is lowered into water several meter below the hull, thus increased detection range by avoiding baffles generated by the hull.11 Anti-submarine armament was limited to short-range rockets and depth charges. Damage control arrangements were minimal. Of the original fourteen ships built to this variant, all are now decommissioned except one reserved as an experiment platform.

- Type 053H1 (NATO codename Jianghu-II)

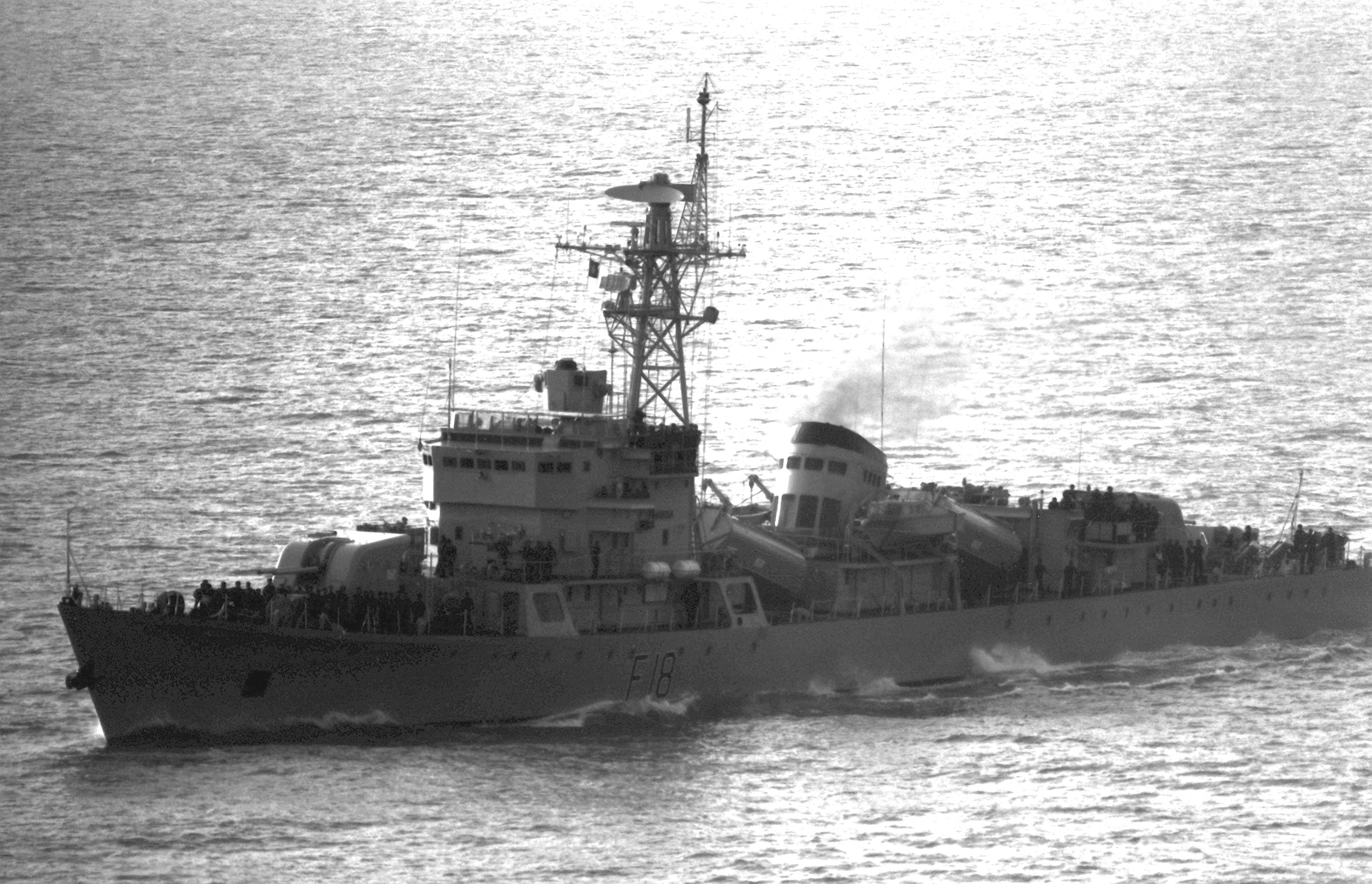
Type 053H1 frigate BNS Osman

Improved Type 053H with newer electronics, engine, and replenishment equipment. The sonar for Type 053H1 is SJD-5, which is a Chinese development of Soviet Tamir-11 (MG-11), (NATO reporting name Stag Hoof), with transistors replacing vacuum tubes in the original Soviet MG-11. Armed with six SY-2 in two triple-box launchers.

Zhaotong (555) was modified with more advanced systems as a test bed. PL-9C SAMs were added to its 37mm AA gun mounts.

8 remained in service in 2007, but most were decommissioned by 2021.

- Type 053H2 (NATO codename Jianghu-III)

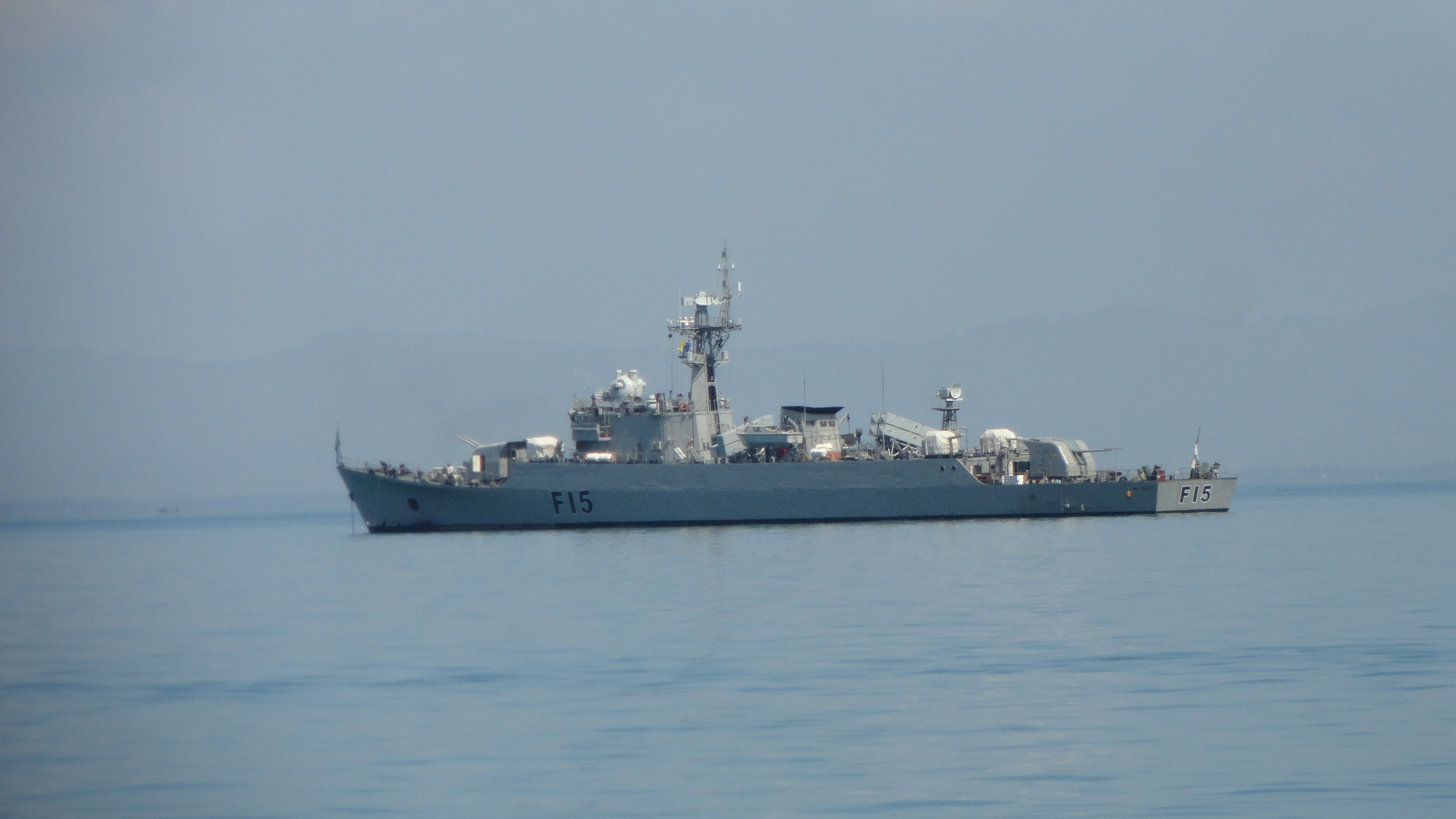
Type 053H2 frigate BNS Abu Bakr

Designed on an enlarged Type 053 hull, and displayed European influence. Considered the first "modern" Chinese frigate with airtight cabins, central air condition, NBC protection, and integrated combat system (British CTC-1629/Chinese ZKJ-3A). The sonar for Type 053H2 is EH-5, a development of earlier SJD-5 used on Type 053H1, with integrated circuits replacing transistors. Armed with two four-box missile launchers, carrying YJ-8 or YJ-82 surface-to-surface missiles (SSM), and four Type 79A 100mm guns in two two-gun turrets. Three were in service with the East Sea Fleet in 1997.

- Type 053H1Q (NATO codename Jianghu-IV)

Modified Type 053H with aft weapons replaced with a helicopter deck for Harbin Z-9 helicopter. Armed with one SY-1 SSM dual-box launcher, and a compact French-made 100mm gun. Only one ship was built; Siping (544) served with the North Sea Fleet. This ship was renamed as Lushun in July 2010, and later transferred to Chinese Naval Academy to serve as a training ship.

- Type 053H1G (NATO codename Jianghu-V)

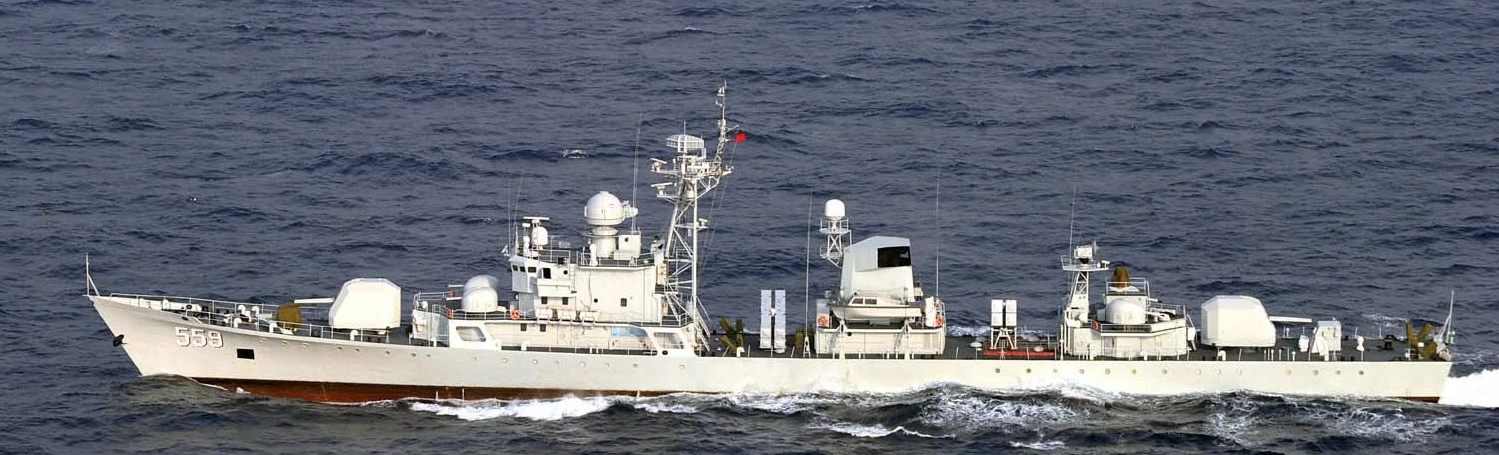
Upgraded Type 053H1G frigate Foshan

Originally an economy class based on the Type 053H1. Six built by the Guangzhou-based Huangpu Shipyard in the 1990s to meet an urgent need for ships by the South Sea Fleet. Incorporated improvements from the Type 053H2, including air-tight cabins, central air conditioning, NBC protection, and integrated combat system. The sonar for Type 0531G is EH-5A, the latest variant of SJD-5/EH-5/Echo Type 5 family, and it's a highly digitized version. Initially armed with six obsolescent SY-1A in two tripled-box launchers, later upgraded to eight YJ-83 SSM in two four-box launchers.

- Type 053H2G (NATO codename Jiangwei-I)
- Type 053H3 (NATO codename Jiangwei-II)
- Naresuan class

== General characteristics ==
	Type 053K	Type 053H	Type 053H2
Displacement	1,674 tons (normal); 1,924 tons (full)	1,457 tons (normal); 1,702 tons (full)	1,720 tons (normal); 1,960 tons (full)
Length	103 m (338 ft)	103.2 m (339 ft)	103.2 m (339 ft)
Beam	10.8 m (35 ft)	10.8 m (35 ft)	11.3 m (37 ft)
Draft	3.1 m (10 ft)	3.05 m (10.0 ft)	3.19 m (10.5 ft)
Powerplant	2 x 14,000 hp diesels	2 x 12E390VA,880 kW (7,885 hp) at 480 rpm.; 4 x SEMT Pielstick 16PA6V280BTC diesel generators (license-built by Shaanxi Diesel Engine Works).	2 x 12E390VA,880 kW (7,885 hp) at 480 rpm.
Speed	26 kn (48 km/h; 30 mph) (design); 30 kn (56 km/h; 35 mph)+ (trials)	26 kn (48 km/h; 30 mph)	26.5 kn (49.1 km/h; 30.5 mph)
Crew	200	190	190-200
Electronics		Type 354 Radar (Eye Shield) 2D air/surface search; Type 352 Radar (Square Tie); G/H-band radar for SSM and 100 mm gun targeting; EH-5 hull-mounted MF sonar; Jug Pair intercept ECM/EW system; ZKJ-3 combat data system (with reported speed of 1 Mbit/s) in some units; Data link: HN-900 (Chinese equivalent of Link 11A/B, to be upgraded); Communication: SNTI-240 SATCOM	Type 354 Radar (Eye Shield) 2D air/surface search, I-band; Type 517H-1 (Knife Rest) 2D long-range air search, A-band; Type 352 Radar (Square Tie) surface search fire-control, I-band; Type 343 (Wasp Head) fire control radar, G/H-band; 2 x Type 341 fire control radar for dual 37 mm AA gun; 2 x Racal RM-1290 navigation radars, I-band; SJD-5 medium-frequency sonar; SJC-1B reconnaissance sonar; SJX-4 communications sonar; CTC-1629 combat data system (or Chinese copy ZKJ-3A); Data link: HN-900 (Chinese equivalent of Link 11A/B, to be upgraded); Communication: SNTI-240 SATCOM; RWD-8 (Jug Pair) intercept EW suite; Type 9230I radar warning receiver; Type 651A IFF
Armament	2 x twin 100 mm gun (22 km range); 2-4 x twin 37mm AAA (8.5 km range); 2 x twin HQ-61B SAM (10 km range); 2 x Type 62, 5-tube ASW RL (1.2 km range); DC rack	6 x SY-1 SSM; 2 x 100 mm gun; 4 x dual 37 mm AA guns; 2 x Type 81 (RBU-1200) 5-tube ASW RL (30 rockets), or 2 x Type 3200 6-tube ASW RL (36 rockets); 2 x Type 62 5-tube A/S mortar launchers; 2 x depth charge (DC) racks & projector	8 x YJ-8 or YJ-82 SSM; 2 x Type 79A dual-100 mm gun; 4 x Type 76 dual-37 mm AA guns; 2 x 5-tube Type 81 ASW rocket launcher (30 rounds); 4 x Type 64 DC projectors; 2 x DC racks; 2 x Mk-36RBOC 6-barrel decoy rocket launchers

== Ships ==
=== Type 053K (Jiangdong) Ships of Class ===
Number	Pennant Number	Name	Namesake	Builder	Launched	Commissioned	Fleet	Status
1	531	鹰潭 / Yingtan	City of Yingtan	Hudong	October 1971	March 1975	East Sea Fleet	Decommissioned in July 1994. Preserved as a museum ship.
2	532	Unknown	Unknown	Qiuxin	May 1975	July 1977	East Sea Fleet	Decommissioned in June 1986. Scrapped.

=== Type 053H Ships of Class ===
Number	Pennant Number	Name	Namesake	Builder	Launched	Commissioned	Fleet	Status
1	516	九江 / Jiujiang	City of Jiujiang	Hudong	28 June 1975	31 December 1975	East Sea Fleet	Decommissioned on June 12, 2018. Ex-Changsha, renamed on August 1, 1981. Converted into fire support ship with MRL's in 2002.
2	515	厦门 / Xiamen	City of Xiamen	Hudong	27 October 1975	31 December 1975	East Sea Fleet	Decommissioned in August 2013. Preserved as a museum ship.
3	517	南平 / Nanping	City of Nanping	Hudong	16 April 1976	31 October 1977	East Sea Fleet	Active. Transferred to Chinese Naval Academy as training ship in 2012.
4	511	南通 / Nantong	City of Nantong	Hudong	9 November 1976	31 March 1977	East Sea Fleet	Decommissioned in August 2012.
5	513	淮安 / Huai'an	City of Huai'an	Hudong	19 April 1977	31 December 1977	East Sea Fleet	Decommissioned on 20 May 2013. Ex-Huaiyin, renamed on December 20, 2006. Transferred to University of Naval Engineering as training ship.
6	512	无锡 / Wuxi	City of Wuxi	Hudong	27 July 1977	14 December 1978	East Sea Fleet	Decommissioned on 16 August 2012.
7	514	镇江 / Zhenjiang	City of Zhenjiang	Hudong	11 February 1978	25 January 1979	East Sea Fleet	Decommissioned on 12 May 2013. Used as a target ship.
8	518	吉安 / Ji'an	City of Ji'an	Hudong	10 July 1978	31 March 1979	South Sea Fleet	Decommissioned in 2012. After retiring, settled in Wuxue Binjiang Park National Defense Education Base.
9	510	绍兴 / Shaoxing	City of Shaoxing	Hudong	26 January 1979	30 June 1979	South Sea Fleet	Decommissioned in March 2007. Transferred to Coast Guard as Coast Guard Patrol Ship #1003.
10	509	常德 / Changde	City of Changde	Hudong	29 April 1979	30 September 1979	South Sea Fleet	Decommissioned in March 2007. Transferred to Coast Guard as Coast Guard Patrol Ship #1002.
11	519	长治 / Changzhi	City of Changzhi	Hudong	24 July 1979	16 December 1979	North Sea Fleet	Active. Reserved as an experiment platform.
12	520	开封 / Kaifeng	City of Kaifeng	Hudong	7 October 1979	28 June 1980	North Sea Fleet	Decommissioned in 1992. Running aground on reef in 1985. Scrapped.
13	551	茂名 / Maoming	City of Maoming	Hudong	10 May 1980	30 September 1980	South Sea Fleet	Decommissioned in October 2012. Scrapped.
14	552	宜宾 / Yibin	City of Yibin	Hudong	17 July 1980	19 December 1980	South Sea Fleet	Decommissioned in October 2012. Scrapped.

=== Type 053H1 Ships of Class ===
Number	Pennant Number	Name	Namesake	Builder	Launched	Commissioned	Fleet	Status
1	533	台州 / Taizhou	City of Taizhou	Hudong	13 December 1981	30 June 1982	East Sea Fleet	Decommissioned on July 13, 2019. Ex-Ningbo, renamed on 6 March 2003.
2	534	金华 / Jinhua	City of Jinhua	Hudong	21 May 1982	13 December 1982	East Sea Fleet	Decommissioned on July 13, 2019. Plans to move her to Hengdian as a museum ship.
3	543	丹东 / Dandong	City of Dandong	Hudong	25 January 1985	30 May 1985	North Sea Fleet	Decommissioned in May 2021. Moved to Dandong as a museum ship.
4	553	韶关 / Shaoguan	City of Shaoguan	Hudong	2 May 1985	24 September 1985	South Sea Fleet	Active.
5	554	安顺 / Anshun	City of Anshun	Hudong	10 March 1986	27 June 1986	South Sea Fleet	Decommissioned in March 2012. Transferred to Burmese Navy as UMS Maha Bandula (F21).
6	555	昭通 / Zhaotong	City of Zhaotong	Hudong	7 September 1986	24 March 1987	South Sea Fleet	Decommissioned on April 29, 2021.
7	545	临汾 / Linfen	City of Linfen	Hudong	9 November 1986	30 September 1987	North Sea Fleet	Decommissioned on July 13, 2019.
8	556	湘潭 / Xiangtan	City of Xiangtan	Hudong	14 July 1987	20 December 1987	South Sea Fleet	Decommissioned in 1989. Transferred to Bangladesh Navy as BNS Osman (F18).Decommissioned in 2020.
9	557	吉首 / Jishou	City of Jishou	Hudong	8 November 1987	15 June 1988	South Sea Fleet	Decommissioned in March 2012. Transferred to Burmese Navy as UMS Maha Thiha Thura (F23).

=== Type 053H1Q Ships of Class ===
Number	Pennant Number	Name	Namesake	Builder	Launched	Commissioned	Fleet	Status
1	544	旅顺 / Lushun	City of Lushun	Hudong	29 September 1985	24 December 1985	North Sea Fleet	Ex-Siping, renamed on 28 July 2010. Active. Transferred to Chinese Naval Academy as training ship in 2010.

=== Type 053H2 Ships of Class ===
Number	Pennant Number	Name	Namesake	Builder	Launched	Commissioned	Fleet	Status
1	535	黄石 / Huangshi	City of Huangshi	Hudong	28 December 1985	14 December 1986	East Sea Fleet	Decommissioned in April 2013. Sold to Bangladesh Navy as BNS Abu Bakr (F15).
2	536	芜湖 / Wuhu	City of Wuhu	Hudong	9 August 1986	29 December 1987	East Sea Fleet	Decommissioned in April 2013. Sold to Bangladesh Navy as BNS Ali Haider (F17).
3	537	沧州 / Cangzhou	City of Cangzhou	Hudong	30 October 1989	17 November 1990	East Sea Fleet	Decommissioned in August 2019. Ex-Zhoushan, renamed on 31 July 2006. Transferred to North Sea Fleet

=== Type 053H1G Ships of Class ===
Number	Pennant Number	Name	Namesake	Builder	Launched	Commissioned	Fleet	Status
1	558	北海 / Beihai	City of Beihai	Huangpu	January 1993	May 1993	East Sea Fleet	Ex-Zigong. Active.
2	560	东莞 / Dongguan	City of Dongguan	Huangpu	March 1993	October 1993	South Sea Fleet	Decommissioned in February 2020
3	561	汕头 / Shantou	City of Shantou	Huangpu		October 1993	South Sea Fleet	Decommissioned in February 2020
4	559	佛山 / Foshan	City of Foshan	Huangpu	December 1993	June 1994	East Sea Fleet	Ex-Kangding. Active
5	562	江门 / Jiangmen	City of Jiangmen	Huangpu		1995	South Sea Fleet	Active. Transferred to Chinese Naval Academy as training ship
6	563	肇庆 / Zhaoqing	City of Zhaoqing	Huangpu		1995	South Sea Fleet	Active. Transferred to Chinese Naval Academy as training ship

=== Service with other navies ===
11 total:

- Bangladesh Navy
  - BNS Osman (F18) (Type 053H1): ex-PLAN Xiangtan (556), sold to Bangladesh in 1989. Decommissioned in 2020.
  - BNS Abu Bakr (F15) (Type 053H2): ex-PLAN Huangshi (535), sold to Bangladesh in 2013.
  - BNS Ali Haider (F17) (Type 053H2): ex-PLAN Wuhu (536), sold to Bangladesh in 2013.
- Myanmar Navy
  - UMS Maha Bandula (F21) (Type 053H1): ex-PLAN Anshun (554), sold to Burma in 2012.
  - UMS Maha Thiha Thura (F23) (Type 053H1): ex-PLAN Jishou (557), sold to Burma in 2012.
- Egyptian Navy
  - ENS Najim al-Zafir (951) (Type 053HE): Decommissioned.
  - ENS Al-Nasser (956) (Type 053HE): Decommissioned.
- Royal Thai Navy
  - HTMS Chao Phraya (455) (Type 053HT): Based on the Type 053H2, built for export in 1991 as 053T (T = Thailand).
  - HTMS Bangpakong (456) (Type 053HT): Same as above
  - HTMS Kraburi (457) (Type 053HT(H)): Improved 053HT-H design, built in 1992 for export. Helicopter deck + YJ-81 (C-801) SSM's.
  - HTMS Saiburi (458) (Type 053HT(H)): Same as above.

== Coast Guard ship class ==
History

China
- Operator: China Coast Guard
- Builder: Jiangnan Shipyard
- Launched: 1974-1975
- Commissioned: 1975-1976
- Recommissioned: 2006 in China Coast Guard
- Decommissioned: 2006 in PLAN
- In service: 2008-present
- Reclassified: Coast Guard Cutter
- Refit: 1996 with PLAN
- Status: in active service

General characteristics
- Type: Ocean patrol vessel - converted (Type 053 frigate Type H)
- Displacement: 1,600 tonnes (1,763.70 short tons)
- Length: 103 metres (338 ft)
- Beam: 10.8 metres (35 ft)
- Height: 3.19 metres (10.5 ft)
- Ice class: N/A
- Propulsion: 2 12PA68TC DE 16000hp
- Speed: 25.6 knots (47.4 km/h)
- Boats & landing craft carried: 2 high speed boats
- Complement: 160-200
- Armament: Small cannon forward and heavy machine guns - replacing 1x dual 37mm gun, 2x dual 14.55mm AA MG; 2x water cannons
- Aircraft carried: Harbin Z-9C
- Notes: 25.6 kn

Two Type 053H are now classed as coast guard cutters following transfer and modifications:

- Changde (509) - now Haijing 1002
- Shaoxing (510) - now Haijing 1003

== See also ==
- List of frigate classes by country

Equivalent frigates of the same era

- Wielingen class
- Lupo class
- Koni class
- Type 21
- Almirante Padilla class
- Ulsan class
