= Type 053H2G frigate =

Chinese navy ships

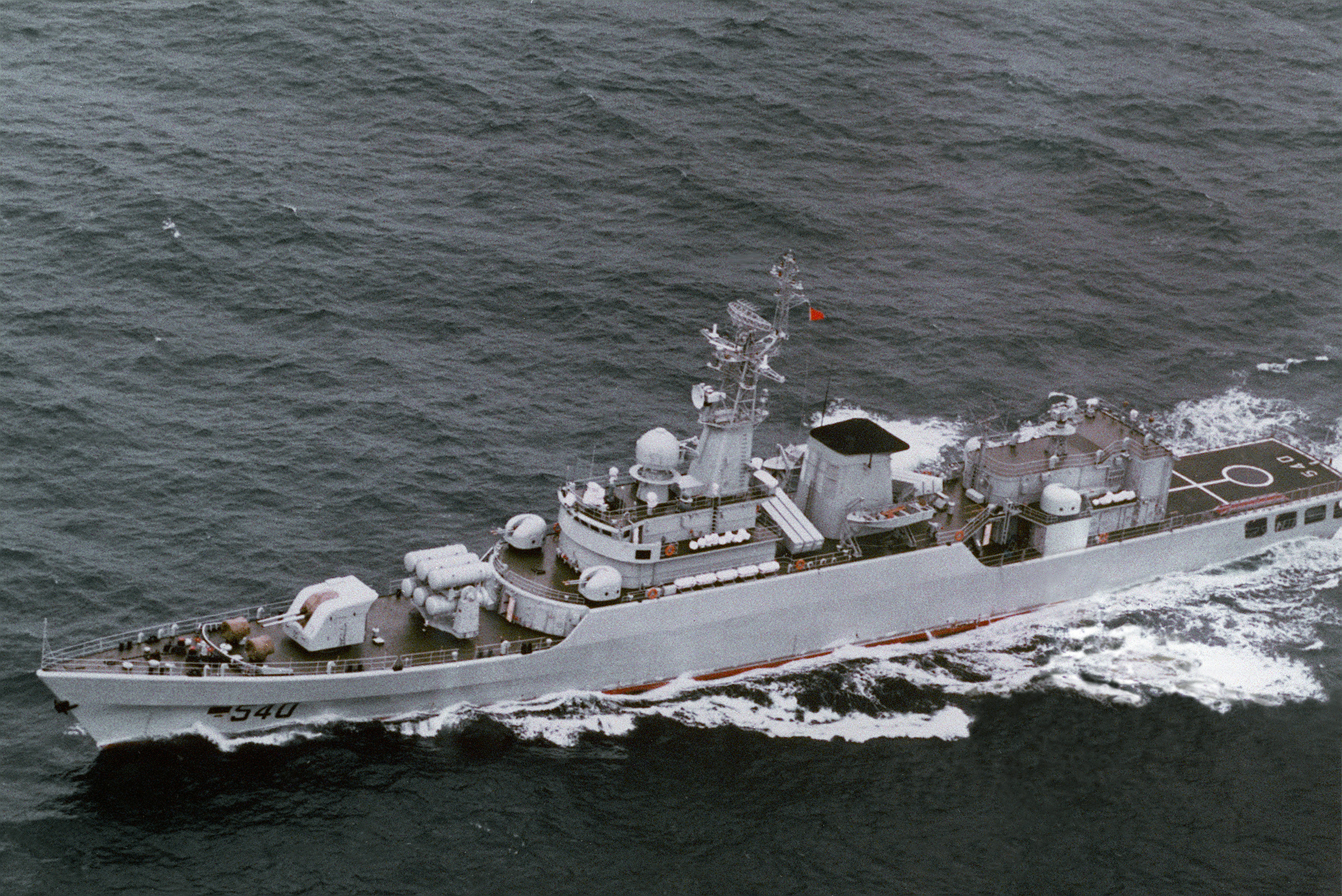
- PLAN Type 053H2G (Jiangwei I) frigate Huainan (540) in 1994

Class overview
- Operators: People's Armed Police China Coast Guard; Sri Lanka Navy; People's Liberation Army Navy Surface Force (former)
- Preceded by: Type 053H frigate
- Succeeded by: Type 053H3 frigate
- Planned: 4
- Completed: 4
- Active: 4

General characteristics
- Type: Large patrol vessel (current); Frigate (formal)
- Displacement: 2,250 tons standard; 2,393 tons full load
- Length: 112 m (367 ft 5 in)
- Beam: 12.4 m (40 ft 8 in)
- Draught: 4.3 m (14 ft 1 in)
- Propulsion: CODAD, 2 shaft, 2 x 18E390VA diesel at 14,000 hp (10,000 kW) & 2x MTU diesel at 8,840 hp (6,590 kW)
- Speed: 28 knots (52 km/h; 32 mph)
- Range: 5,000 mi (8,000 km) at 15 to 16 knots (28 to 30 km/h; 17 to 18 mph)
- Complement: 168 (with 30 officers)
- Sensors & processing systems: Type 360 Radar (SR60) Surface Search, E/F band; Type 517H-1 (Knife Rest) 2D long-range air search, A-band; Type 345 Radar (MR35) Surface-to-air missile and 100 mm gun fire-control, J-band; Type 352 Radar (Square Tie) surface search and SSM fire control, I-band; 2 × Type 347G/EFR-1 (Rice Lamp) dual 37 mm AA gun fire control, I-band; 2 × Racal RM-1290 Navigation radar, I-band
- Electronic warfare & decoys: Data link: HN-900 (Chinese equivalent of Link 11A/B, to be upgraded); Communication: SNTI-240 SATCOM; Combat Data System: ZKJ-3C; RWD-8 (Jug Pair) intercept; Type 981-3 EW Jammer; SR-210 Radar warning receiver; Type 651A IFF
- Armament: China Coast Guard: 4 × Type 76A dual-37 mm AA guns (replaced with 25mm cannons on Haijing 2201); Sri Lanka Navy: 1 × PJ33A dual 100 mm gun (automatic); 4 × Type 76A dual-37 mm AA guns; PLAN frigate configuration: 6 × YJ-83 SSM in 2 x 3-cell box launchers; 1 × 6-cell HQ-61 Surface-to-air missile system; 1 × PJ33A dual 100 mm gun (automatic); 4 × Type 76A dual-37 mm AA guns; 2 × 6-tube Type 3200 ASW rocket launchers (36 rockets); 2 × DC racks & launcher; 6 × torpedo launchers; 2 × Type 946/PJ-46 15-barrel decoy rocket launchers
- Aircraft carried: Harbin Z-9C (Replaced with Z-8 in Chinese Coast Guard Service)
- Aviation facilities: Hangar

The Type 053H2G (NATO codename Jiangwei I) are a class of Frigates which were later converted as patrol vessels. The ship class entered service with the People's Liberation Army Navy Surface Force as frigate in the 1990s. They were later variants of the Type 053 frigate family, and were the PLAN's first multi-role frigates. Only four units were built before the class was superseded by the more capable Type 053H3 frigate. Three vessels were converted to patrol use and are currently serving as coast guard cutters and the frigate Tongling was transferred to the Sri Lanka Navy in 2019 as a patrol vessel, which was commissioned as SLNS Parakramabahu.

== History ==
In the 1980s, the PLAN ordered Shanghai-based Hudong Shipyard (now Hudong-Zhonghua Shipyard) to build a replacement for the Type 053K air defence frigate. The new class was based on the Type 053H2 frigate and designated Type 053H2G. Development was carried out under Project 055.

The Type 053H2G was slightly larger than the Type 053H2, and equipped with HQ-61B surface-to-air missiles (SAM). Four Type 053H2G were built between 1988 and 1991. Some sources claim they were called Type 055 and uprated with HQ-7 SAMs; the alternate designation may have been confused with the Type 053H2G's development designation.

The HQ-61 SAM proved unsatisfactory and the class was superseded by the Type 053H3 which was an improved Type 053H2G equipped with HQ-7 SAMs.

When the first three ships (Anqing, Huaibei and Huainan) of the class were transferred to the Coast Guard, all weapons except for the 4 Type 76 twin 37 mm naval guns were removed; the Z-9C helicopter was also replaced with a Z-8. On Jintang(former Anqing) the twin 37mm guns were further replaced with twin 25mm cannons.

All of the ships handed to the CCG are in the 2nd Bureau of the China Coast Guard, stationed in Ningbo.

== Ships of Class ==
Number	Pennant Number	Name	Namesake	Builder	Launched	Commissioned	Fleet	Status
1	539 (In navy service) 31239 (Pre-2018 Coast guard service); 2201 (Post-2018 Coast Guard Servcice)	安庆 / Anqing (In Navy service) 金塘 / Jintang (In Coast Guard service)	City of Anqing (In navy service) Jintang island (In coast guard service)	Hudong, Shanghai	June 1990	July 1992	East Sea Fleet	Decommissioned in 2015. Transferred to Coast Guard as Jintang (31239), later renumbered to 2201.(now ready to transfer friend countries like a opv)
2	540 (In navy service) 31240 (Pre-2018 Coast guard service); 2202 (Post-2018 Coast Guard service)	淮南 / Huainan (In navy service) 洞头 / Dongtou (In Coast Guard service)	City of Huainan (In navy service) District of Dongtou (in coast guard service)	Hudong, Shanghai	December 1990	December 1992	East Sea Fleet	Decommissioned in 2015. Transferred to Coast Guard as Dongtou (31240), later renumbered to 2202.(now ready to transfer friend countries like a opv )
3	541 (In navy service) 31241 (Pre-2018 coast guard service); 2203 (Post-2018 coast guard service)	淮北 / Huaibei (in navy service) 玉环 / Yuhuan (in coast guard service)	City of Huaibei (In navy service) City of Yuhuan (In coast guard service)	Hudong, Shanghai	December 1992	July 1993	East Sea Fleet	Decommissioned in 2015. Transferred to Coast Guard as Yuhuan (31241), later renumbered to 2203.(now ready to transfer to frind countries like a opv)
4	542	铜陵 / Tongling	City of Tongling	Hudong, Shanghai	December 1993	July 1994	East Sea Fleet	Decommissioned in 2015. Transferred to Sri Lanka Navy in September 2018 as SLNS Parakramabahu (P625)
