= Type 354 radar =

Chinese naval radar

Type 354 Radars are one of the most widely deployed air and surface search naval radars in Chinese service. The Type 354 was predominantly found on major People's Liberation Army Navy (PLAN) surface combatants such as the Luda class destroyer and Jianghu class frigate in the 1980s and 1990s. By 2006 it was slowly being replaced in favour of the Type 360 radar, which in turn, itself being replaced by Type 364 radar for new vessels.

Type 354 is the first generation low altitude air search radar indigenously developed by China. Originally assigned designers were the 706th Institute and 714th Institute in October 1965, but the design work was subsequently transferred to the 724th Institute in August 1970. Sea trials begun in 1972 and completed in the following year. Certification received in January 1974, and production begun three months later. There are three types of displays A, B, & P for various platforms.

The radar can be recognised by its distinctive large "orange-peel" paraboloid reflector antenna.

== Specifications ==
- G/H band (4–8 GHz)
- Beam: 1.2 × 5 deg
- Peak power: 500 kW
- Pulse width: 4 μs
- Polarisation: linear
- Beam width: 1.20 (horizontal); 1.30 (vertical)
- PRF: 400 or 800 Hz
- Scan rate: 4–10 rpm
- Resolution: 800 m (range); 1.30 (azimuth)
- Range: more than 93 km on aircraft with RCS of 10 m^{2}
- Other reported names:
  - MX902
  - H/LJQ-354

== See also ==
- Type 051 Luda class destroyer
- Type 053 Jianghu class frigate
