= Type 341 radar =

Chinese fire control radar

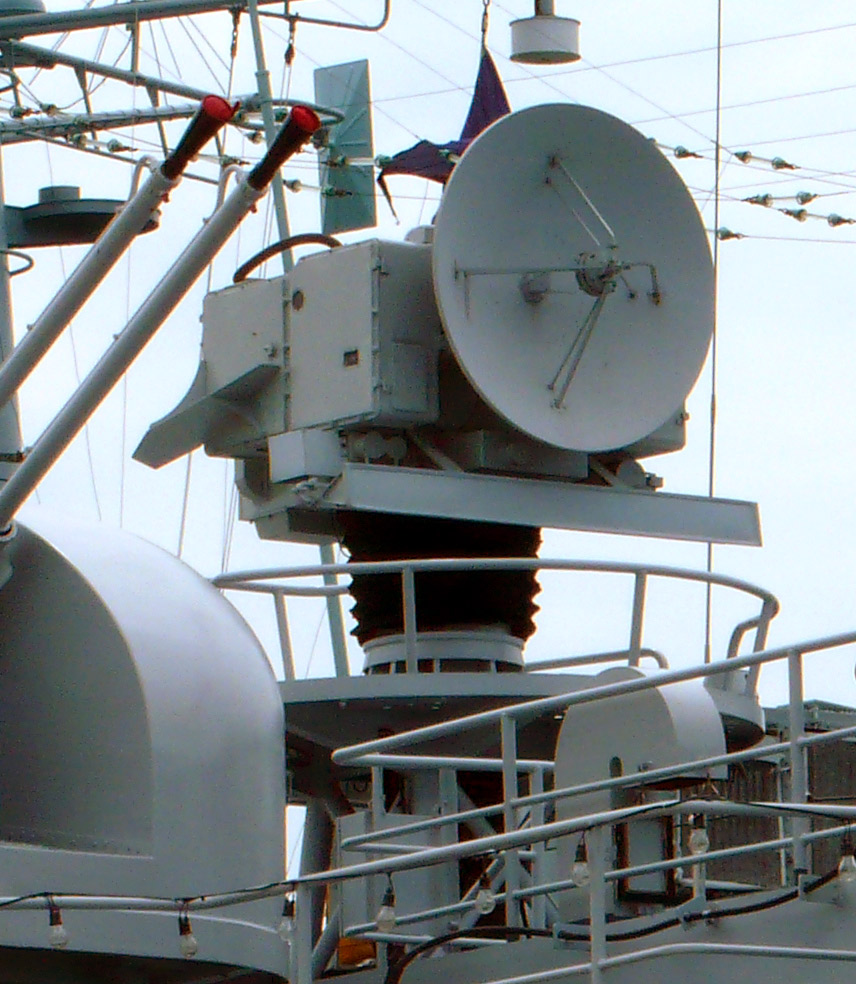
Front view of Type 341 radar deployed on Type 053H3 Frigate. Photo taken at IMDEX 2007, Singapore

The Type 341 Radar is a fire control radar in conjunction with the Type 76A dual-37mm automatic AAA gun used on a number of early PLA-N frigates and destroyers. It has been succeeded by Type 347 Radar in Chinese service. Type 341 is the first generation gun control radar indigenously developed in China and it is used to control 30 mm and 37 mm guns. Type 341 radar can direct two guns simultaneously against a single target. Development begun in 1970, with design finalized in December 1974. First prototype was completed in May 1975, and two more delivered for further evaluation in December 1979. Design was finalized in March 1984, and seven months later, production was transferred from the original Shanghai 2nd Radio Factory to Factory 4110 in Guizhou. In 1983, Type 341 won the Scientific and Technological Achievement Award in Fourth Ministry of Machine-Building of the PRC.

== Specifications ==
- I - band
- Other reported names:
  - RICE LAMP
  - H/LJP-341A

== See also ==
- Type 051 Luda class destroyer
