= Type 343 Radar =

Chinese fire control radar

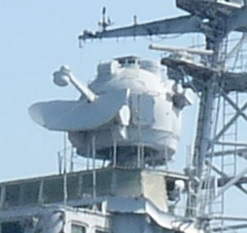
Type 343 on destroyer Jinan.

Type 343 radar (Chinese: 343型雷达) is a Chinese fire control radar installed on Type 051 destroyer, and has been since retired from active service.

Type 343 radar is the first generation Chinese fire control radar for large caliber guns, with development begun in 1968, with 720th Research Institute assigned as the develop in October of the same year. Sea trials begun in July 1970 and design completed in 1976, with state certification received in 1979. A total of 12 sets were produced, with first five built by 720th Institute, and production subsequently transferred to Plant 410 in Guizhou in 1982. The radar operates in two bands, X-band is usually used, with Ku-band as backup. The radar can detect and track medium-sized surface target around 30 and 20 km away respectively.

Type 343 is a 2-D air search radar with MTBF of 40 hours, and in addition to control guns, it is also used for anti-ship missile fire control. As a 2-D air search radar, Type 343 can only provide bearing and range, and to provide altitude information on the target, a large optical ranging set is needed, which requires an operator. Therefore, an operator's cupola is attached to the radar, immediately behind the antenna. An improved version Type 343-Gai (改), has the operator cupola deleted and the bulky complex optical ranging set replaced by a compact, but far more capable electro-optical sensor (EO) that is only a tiny fraction size of the original equipment it replaced. As more advanced radars available, Type 343 has been phased from active service in Chinese navy.

== See also ==
- Chinese radars
- Naval Weaponry of the People's Liberation Army Navy
