= Rangout radar =

Search and targeting radar

The Rangout (NATO reporting name: Square Tie) is a Soviet naval radar. It was used by small ships for navigation, air and surface search, and target acquisition for the P-15 Termit anti-ship missile.

The People's Republic of China produced a copy or variant called Type 352.
