= Type 79 100 mm naval gun =

Chinese naval gun

The Type 79 Twin 100 mm gun is the first indigenously developed large caliber Chinese naval gun. A decision was made in 1970 to replace the Soviet 100/56 B-34 single 100 mm semi-enclosed gun mount. By June 1973, the first batch was completed and two were installed onboard frigates for test and evaluation. Two more upgrades were eventually developed.

== Type 79 ==
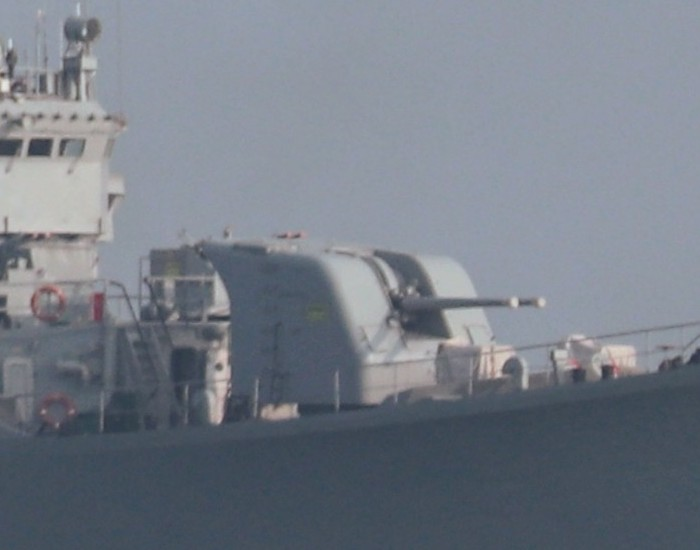
Type 79 twin 100 mm gun in Type 053H2 class frigate BNS Abu Bakr of the Bangladesh Navy.

The first of the family, this gun was fully automatic and controlled by Type 343 radar. However, being the first fully automatic gun and the first indigenously developed gun at the same time, the Chinese was not confident enough on the design, and thus incorporated manual backup systems. This proved to be baseless because later operation proved that the reliability of the automated system was just as good as the simpler manual system.

== Type 79A (H/PJ33A) ==
Based on the successful performance of the automated system, the manual backup system was eliminated in this upgrade. As a result, the total weight and size of the gun mount was reduced. Beside the obvious different in size, the most obvious visual external difference between Type 79 and Type 79A is that the Type 79 version has sharp edges, thus a very boxy look like the cars of the 1970s, while Type 79A has round and curved edges, thus a rather smooth look like the cars of the 1990s.

== H/PJ-33B ==
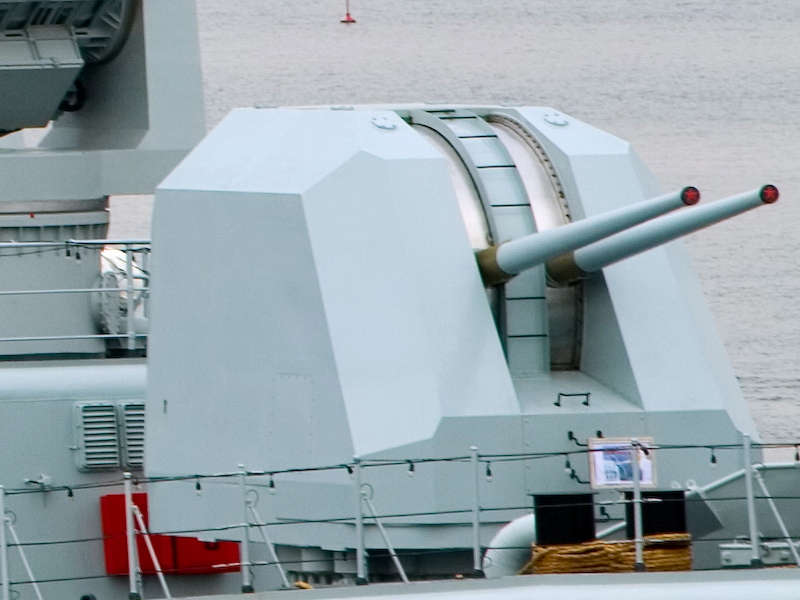
A Dual barrel H/PJ-33B 100 mm gun in Type 053H3 class frigate.

The newest family of the Type 79 family is the PJ33A Twin 100 mm gun, and this version has a redesigned gun turret with stealthy features. This newest version was originally planned to replace the Type 79A, which in turn, was replacing the Type 79, however the plan was cut short when newer single barreled 100 mm such as Type 210 and its successor H/PJ87 entered service.
