= Type 76 twin 37 mm naval gun =

H/PJ-76
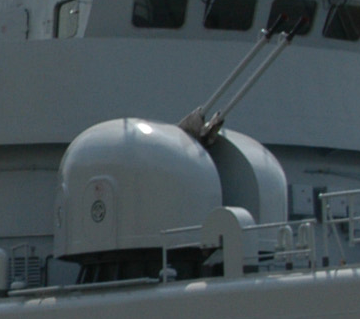
- Type 76A on the Type 053H3 frigate Sanming (524)
- Place of origin: China

Service history
- In service: 1976–present

Production history
- Designed: 1970s

Specifications
- Shell: 37×252SR
- Calibre: 37 mm (1.5 in)
- Barrels: 2
- Elevation: -10°/+85°
- Traverse: 360°
- Rate of fire: 750-800 rounds per minute
- Muzzle velocity: 1,000 m/s (3,300 ft/s)
- Effective firing range: 4,500 m (4,900 yd)
- Maximum firing range: 9,400 m (10,300 yd)

The Type 76 twin 37mm naval gun (also known by the designation H/PJ-76) is a small caliber naval artillery piece from the People's Republic of China. The Type 76A was in naval service in the 1990s.

== See also ==
- Denel 35mm Dual Purpose Gun
- Aselsan GOKDENIZ
