= List of equipment of the Royal Thai Navy =

This article is the list of equipment of the Royal Thai Navy, including active and historic equipments. The equipment of the Royal Thai Navy have been produced in many countries, such as Canada, China, France, Germany, Italy, Japan, Netherlands, Singapore, South Korea, Spain, the United States, and the United Kingdom along with India.

== Ships ==
=== Submarine ===
Class	Origin	Ship	Hull No. /Commissioned	Displacement	Notes
Submarine (1 under construction)
Type S26T	China	HTMS Matchanu		2,600 tonnes	As of 28 May 2024, one vessel is under construction and two more are planned. The first submarine is scheduled to be delivered in 2027.

=== Helicopter carrier ===
Class	Origin	Ship	Hull No. /Commissioned	Displacement	Notes
Helicopter carrier (1 in service)
Chakri Narubet class	Spain	HTMS Chakri Naruebet	CVH-911/1997	11,486 tonnes	Armament: 4 × Rheinmetall Rh 202; 2 × 0.5-inch machine guns; 3 × hextuple Sadral launchers for Mistral SAM; Helicopter carried: 6 × SH-70B Seahawk; 2 × MH-60S Knighthawk; Up to 14 additional helicopters; a mix of SH-70B Seahawk, MH-60S Knighthawk, S-76B and Mi-17

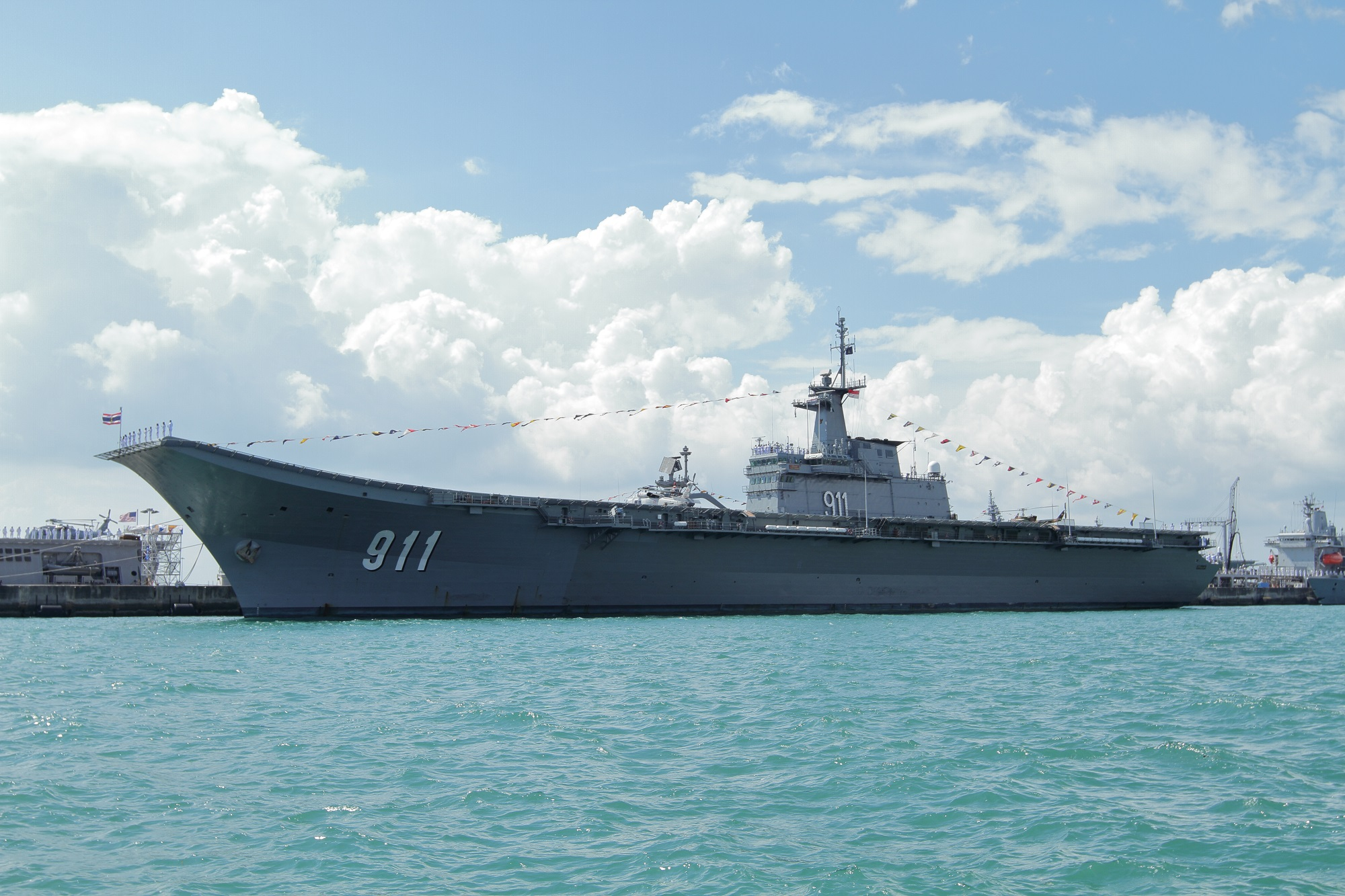
Royal Thai Navy helicopter carrier HTMS Chakri Naruebet at Changi Naval Base, Singapore 2017.

=== Amphibious warfare ship ===
Class	Origin	Ship	Hull No. /Commissioned	Displacement	Notes
Amphibious warfare ship (4 in service)
Type 071E	China	HTMS Chang	LPD-792/2023	22,000 tonnes	Can embark 600 to 800 troops with three transport helicopters. Armament: 1 × OTO Melara 76 mm/62 compact; 2 × RWS EM&E Sentinel 30 mm; 2 × Rheinmetall Rh 202; 6 × 12.7 mm M2HB
Endurance class	Singapore	HTMS Angthong	LPD-791/2012	7,600 tonnes	Can embark 400 to 500 troops with two transport helicopters. Armament: 1 × OTO Melara 76 mm/62 compact; 2 × DS-30M; 6 × 12.7 mm M2HB
Sichang class	Thailand	HTMS Sichang HTMS Surin	LST-721/1987 LST-722/1988	4,520 tonnes	Thai designation and built locally based on Normed PS 700 class can embark 300 to 350 troops with one transport helicopters. Armament: 2 × Bofors 40mm/60; 2 × Rheinmetall Rh 202; 2 × 12.7 mm M2HB

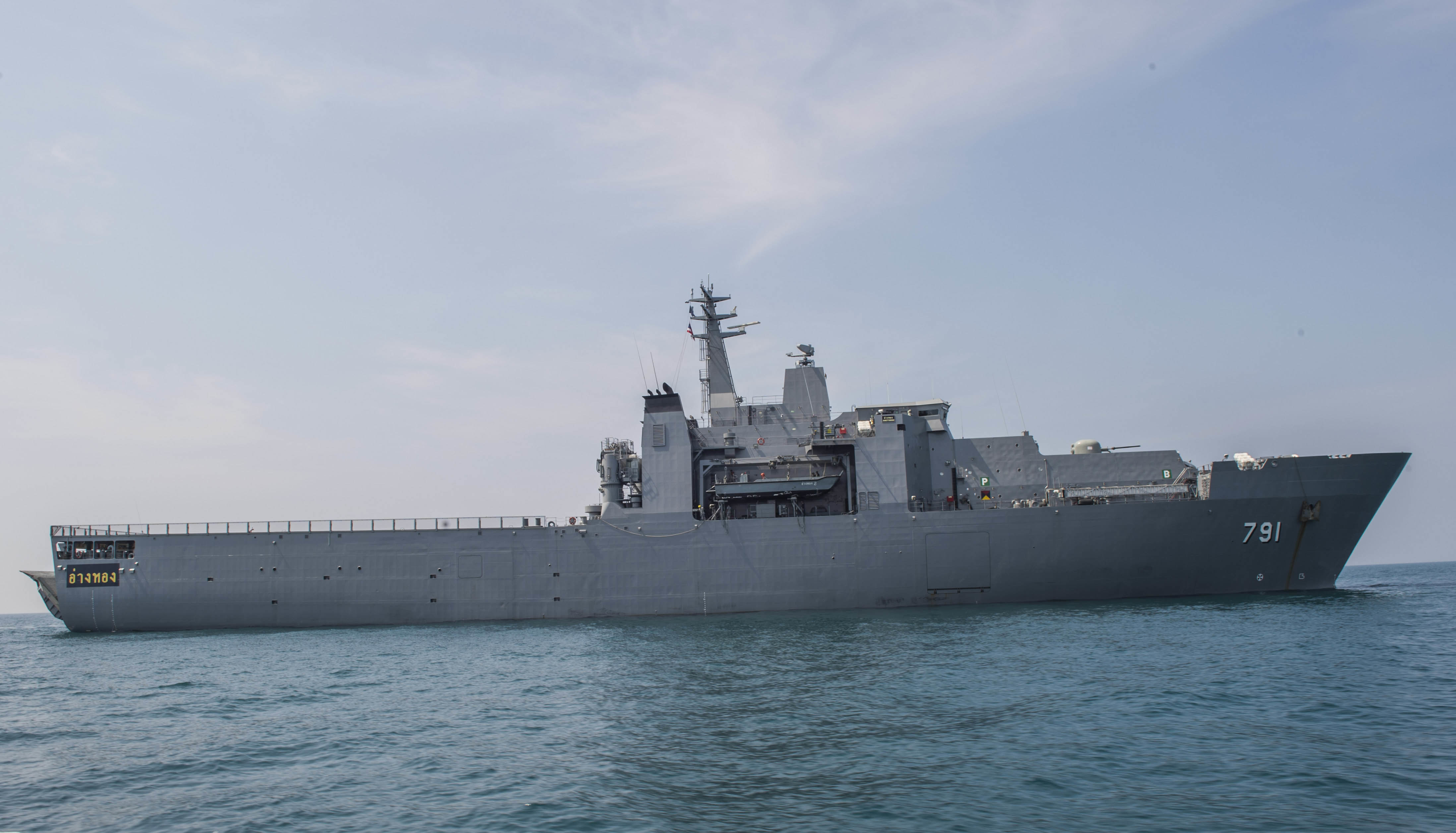
The Royal Thai Navy ship HTMS Angthong navigates the waters off the coast of Thailand

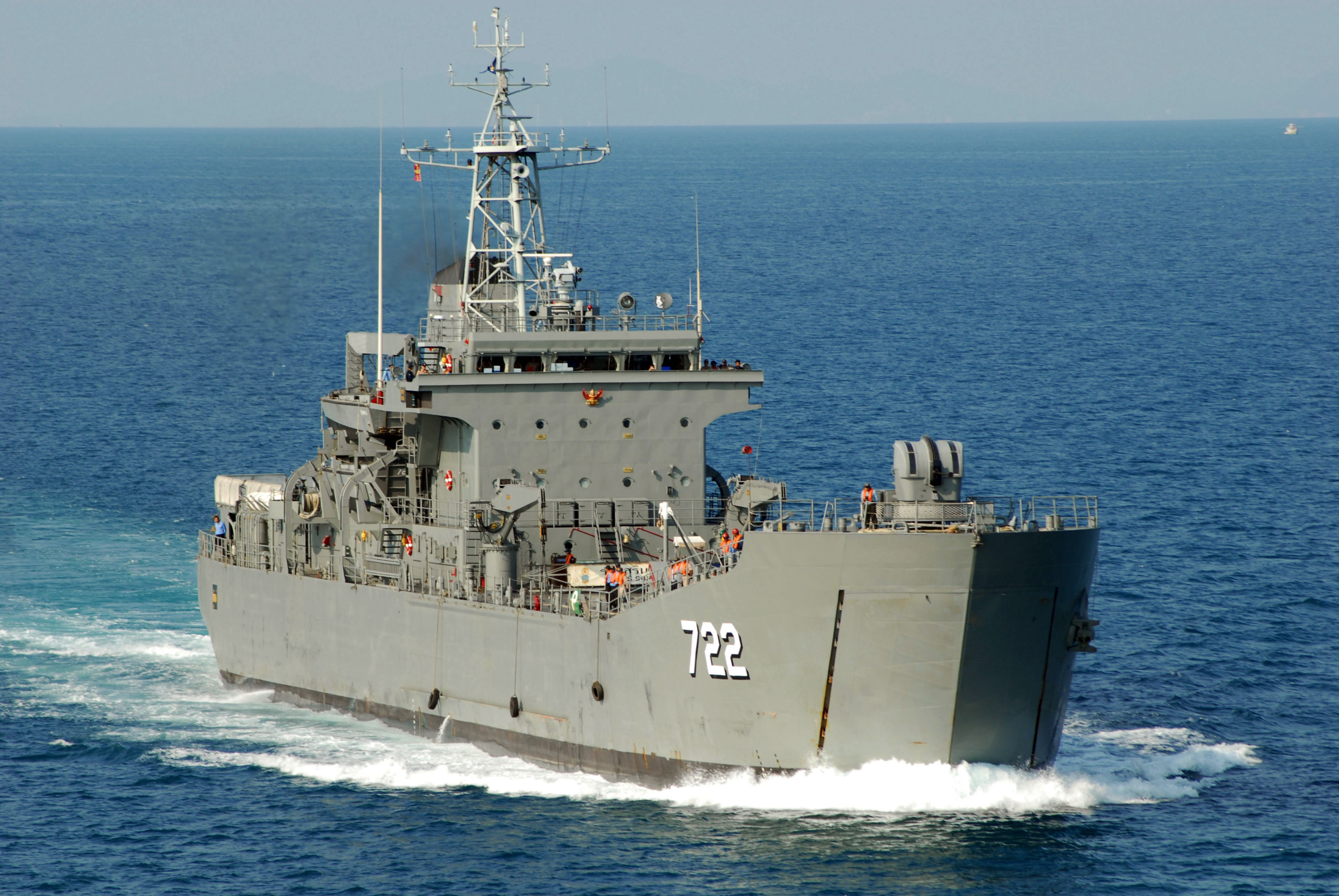
The Royal Thai Navy ship medium landing ship HTMS Surin transits the Gulf of Thailand.

=== Frigate ===
Class	Origin	Ship	Hull No. /Commissioned	Displacement	Notes
Frigate (7 in service)
Bhumibol Adulyadej class	South Korea	HTMS Bhumibol Adulyadej	FFG-471/2019	3,700 tonnes	Thai designation, built in South Korea. Multi-role stealth frigate. Armament: 1 × OTO Melara 76 mm Super Rapid; 1 × 20 mm Phalanx CIWS; 2 × DS-30M; 8 cell Mk.41 vertical launch system for 32 x RIM-162 ESSM; 8 × RGM-84 Harpoon SSM; 2 × Triple SEA torpedo launchers with Mark 54 torpedo
Naresuan class	China	HTMS Naresuan HTMS Taksin	FFG-421/1995 FFG-422/1995	2,985 tonnes	Thai designation, built in China. Frigate. Armament: 1 × Mk-45 Mod 2 - 127mm; 2 × DS-30M; 8 cell Mk.41 vertical launch system for 32 × RIM-162 ESSM; 8 × RGM-84 Harpoon SSM; 2 × Triple Mark 32 torpedo tubes
Chao Phraya class	China	HTMS Chao Phraya HTMS Bangpakong HTMS Kraburi HTMS Saiburi	FFG-455/1995 FFG-456/1995 FFG-457/1995 FFG-458/1995	1,924 tonnes	Thai designation, built in China. Frigate. Armament: 2 × Type 79 100 mm naval gun; 4 × Type 76A twin 37 mm naval gun; 8 × C802A missiles; 2 × Type 86 ASW rocket launcher

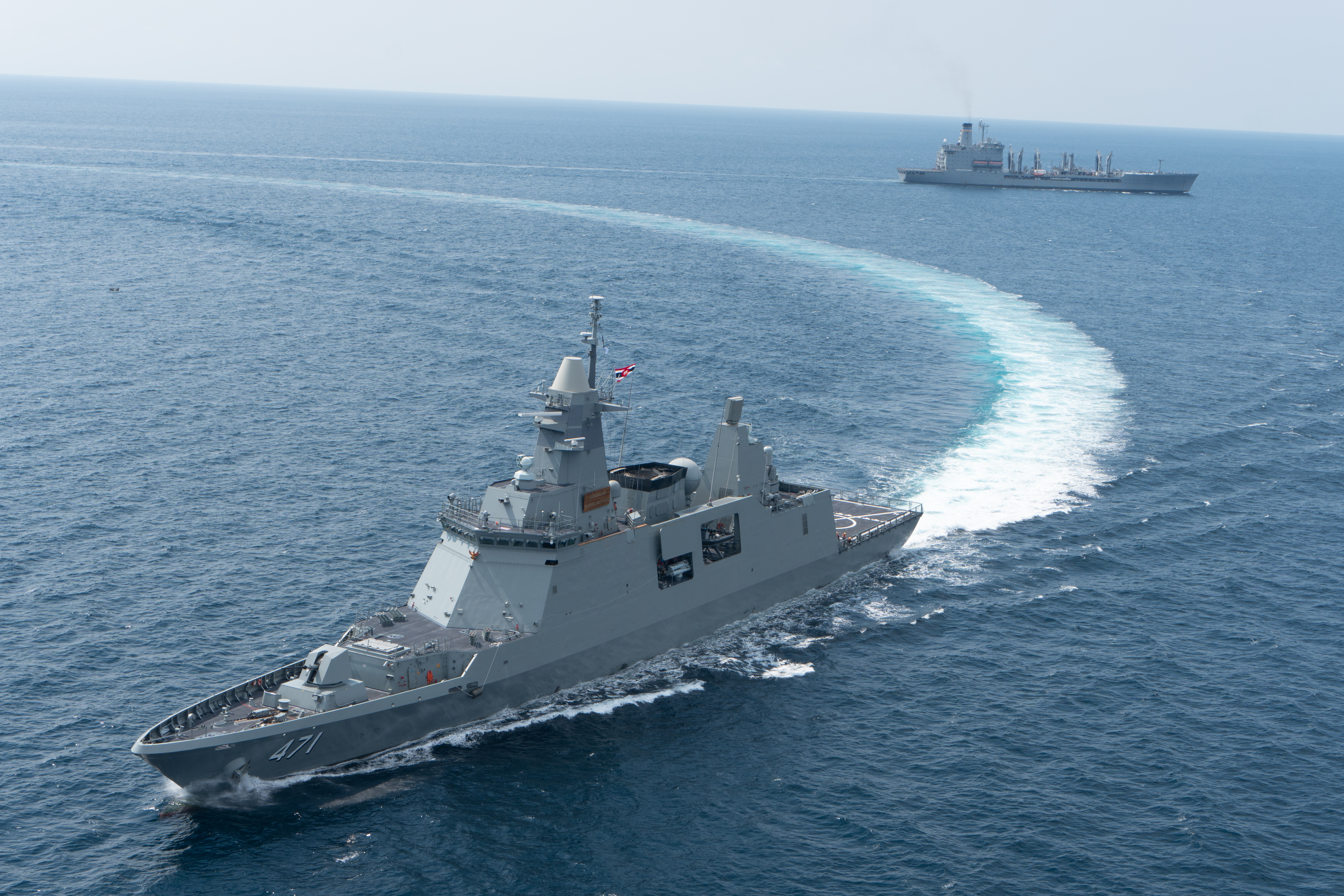
The Royal Thai Navy frigate HTMS Bhumibol Adulyadej sails in formation Guardian Sea 2019.

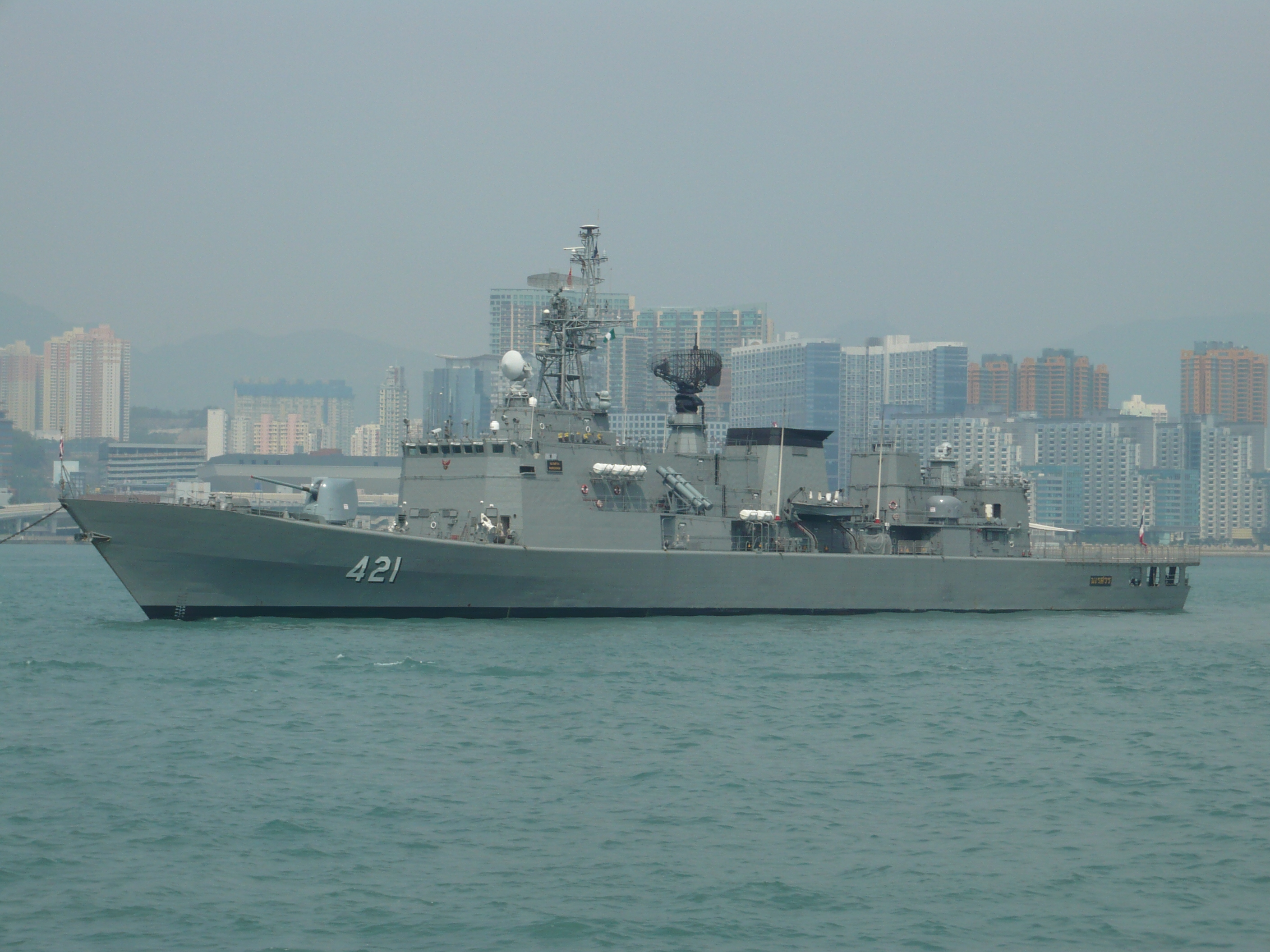
Thai Navy frigate HTMS Naresuan moored in Victoria Harbour, Hong Kong, China.

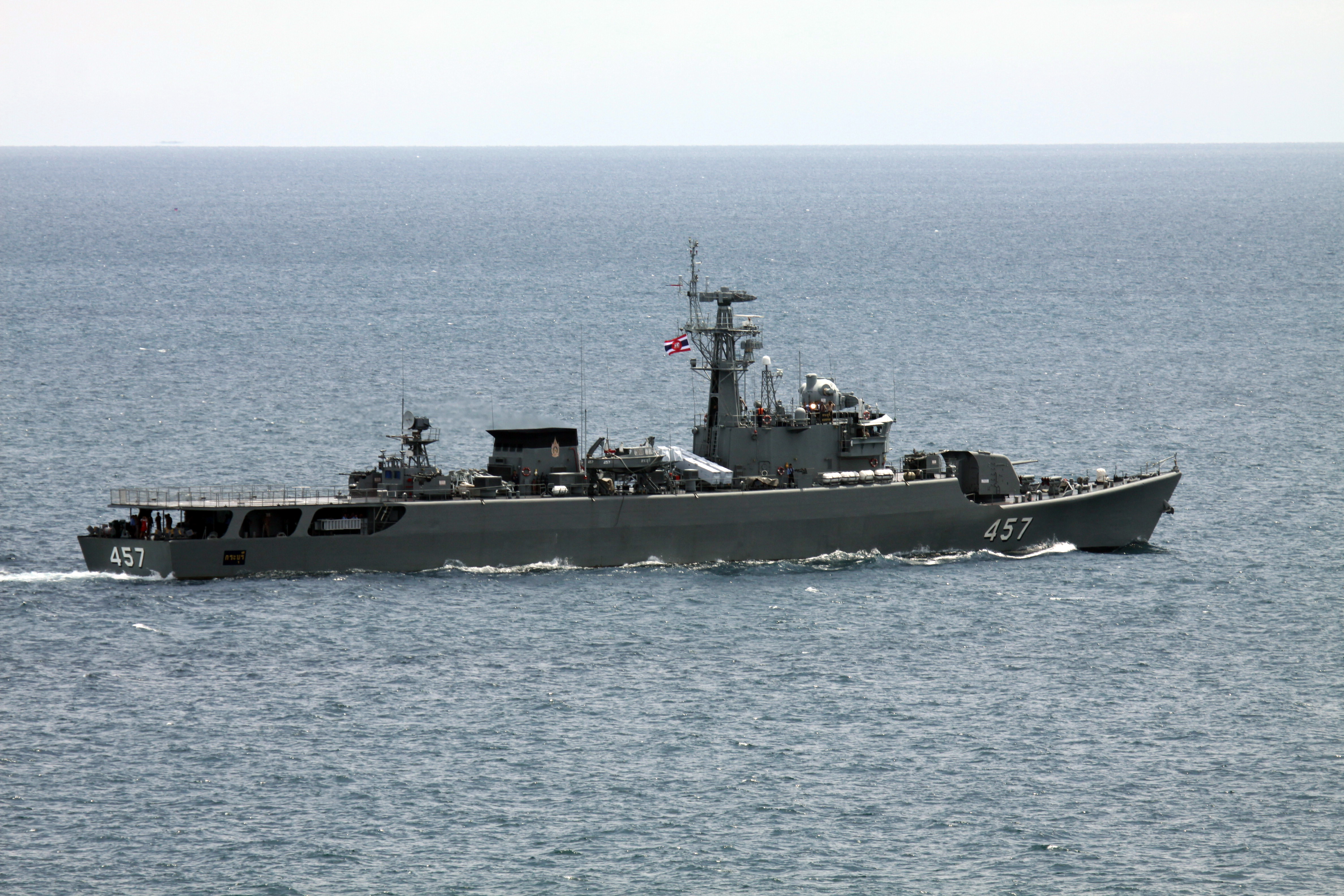
Thai Navy frigate HTMS Kraburi underway in the Pacific Ocean.

=== Corvette ===
Class	Origin	Ship	Hull No. /Commissioned	Displacement	Notes
Corvette (4 in service)
Ratanakosin class	United States	HTMS Ratanakosin	FS-441/1986	960 tonnes	Guided missile corvette. Armament: 1 × OTO Melara 76 mm/62 compact; 1 × DARDO CIWS; 2 × 20 mm Oerlikon GAM-B01 cannon; 24 × Selenia Aspide; 8 × RGM-84 Harpoon SSM; 2 × Triple Mark 32 torpedo tubes
Khamronsin class	Thailand	HTMS Khamronsin HTMS Thayanchon HTMS Longlom	FS-531/1992 FS-532/1992 FS-533/1992	630 tonnes	Anti-submarine warfare corvette. Armament: 1 × OTO Melara 76 mm/62 compact; 1 × DS-30M; 2 × Triple torpedo tubes

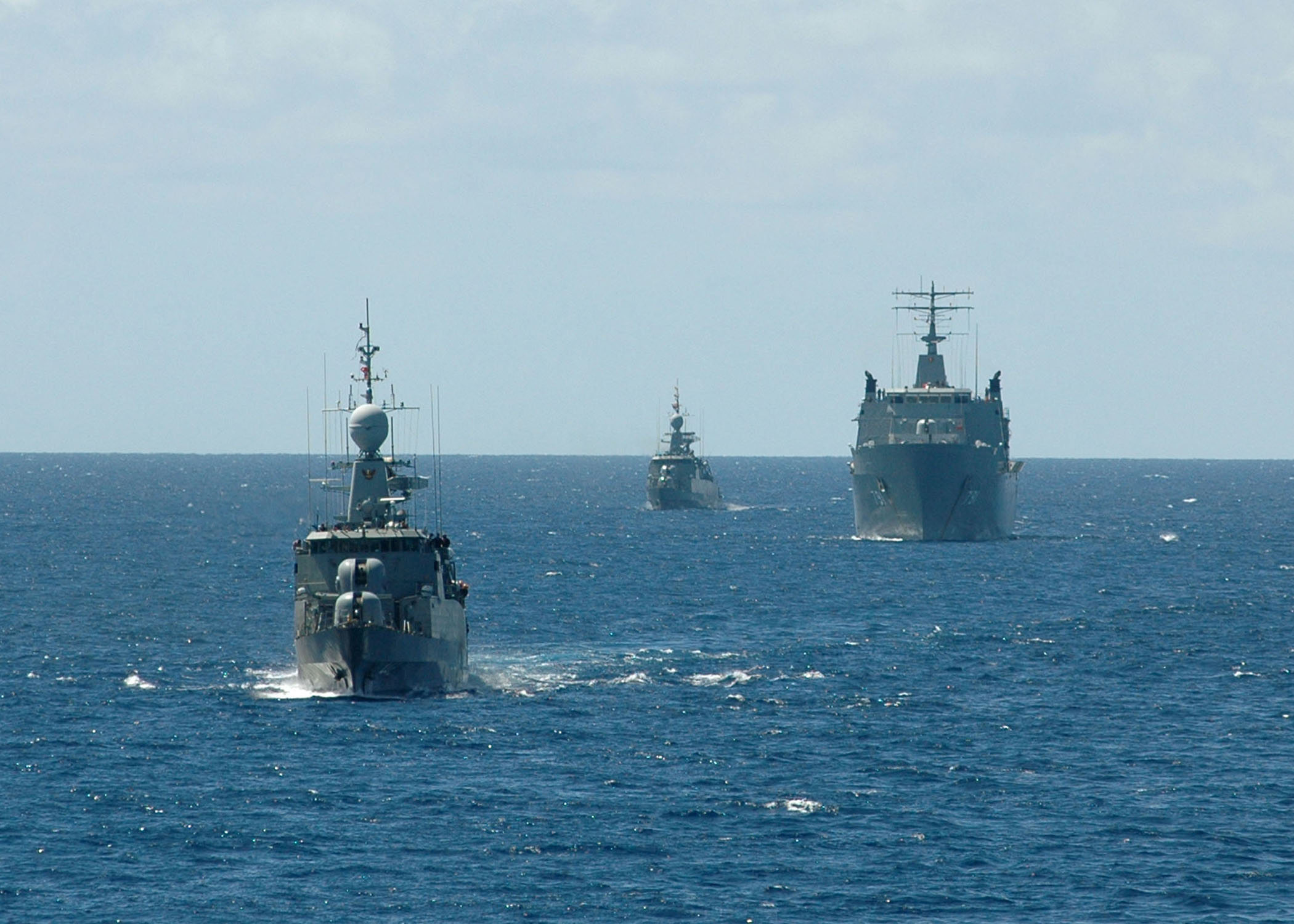
HTMS Sukhothai and its sister HTMS Ratanakosin sail alongside HTMS Angthong during the CARAT 2013 naval exercise.

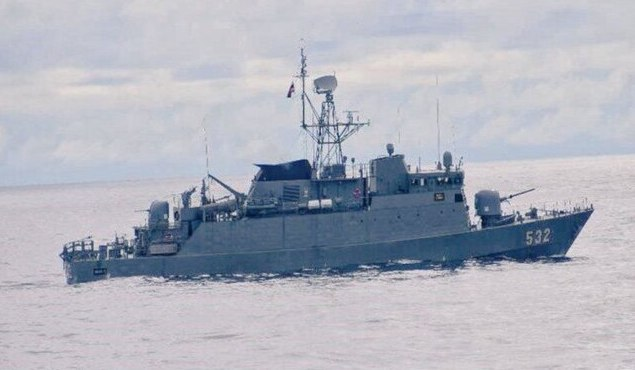
His Majesty’s Thailand Ship (HTMS) Tayanchon, a Khamrosin Class Anti-submarine Corvette.

=== Offshore patrol vessel ===
Class	Origin	Ship	Hull No. /Commissioned	Displacement	Notes
Offshore patrol vessel (4 in service)
Krabi class	Thailand	HTMS Krabi HTMS Prachuap Khiri Khan	OPV-551/2013 OPV-552/2019	1,969 tonnes	Armament: 1 × OTO Melara 76 mm gun; 2 × DS-30MR; 2 × 12.7 mm M2HB; 4 × RGM-84 Harpoon SSM (on 552 only); bought blueprints from BAE system, built domestically
Pattani class	China	HTMS Pattani HTMS Naratiwat	OPV-511/2005 OPV-512/2005	1,460 tonnes	Thai design built in China. Armament: 1 × OTO Melara 76 mm/62 compact; 2 × Denel Land Systems GI-2 20mm autocannon; 2 × US Ordnance M2HB .50 calibre machine gun

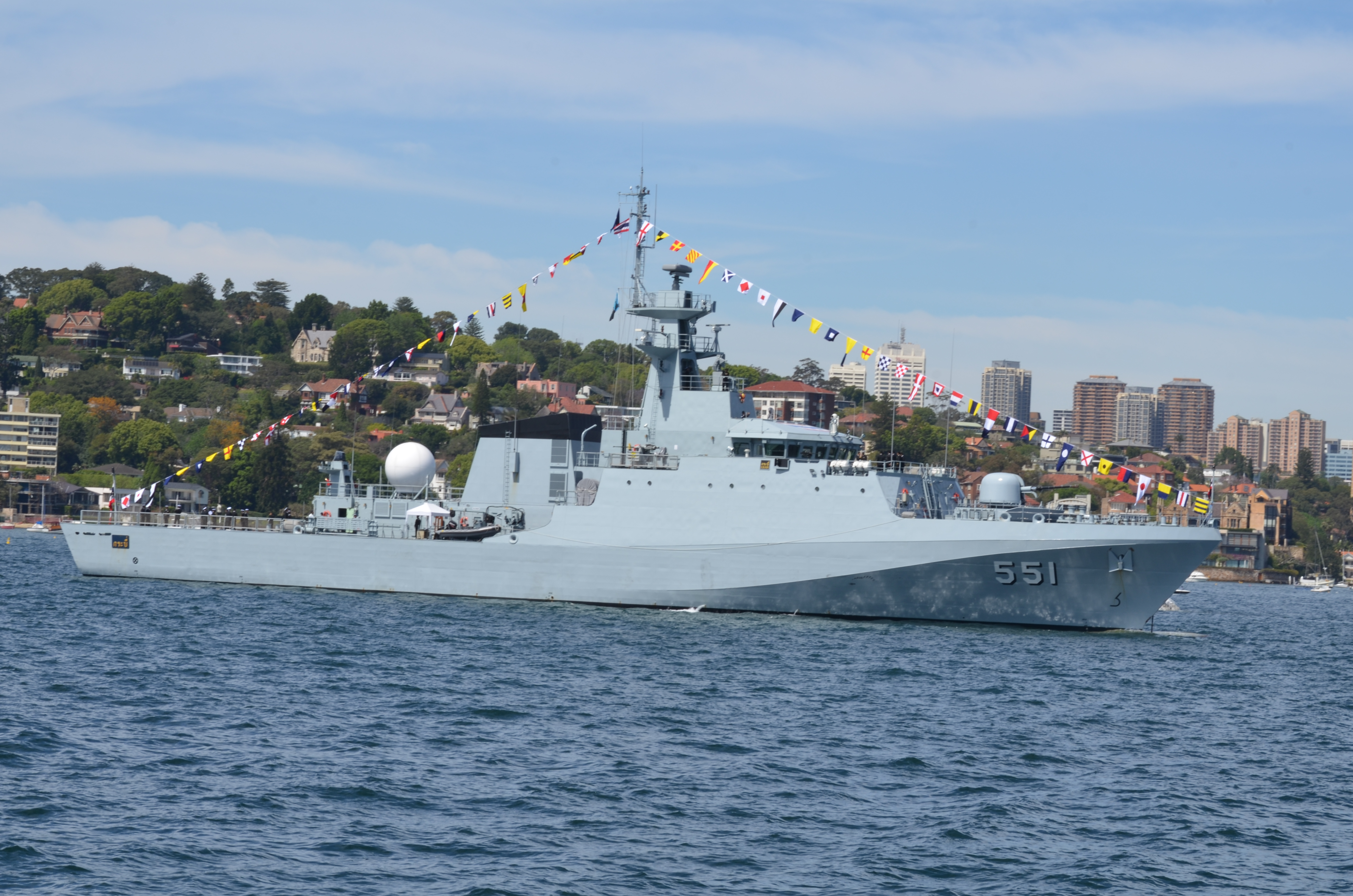
Thai offshore patrol vessel HTMS Krabi, moored in Sydney Harbour, Australia.

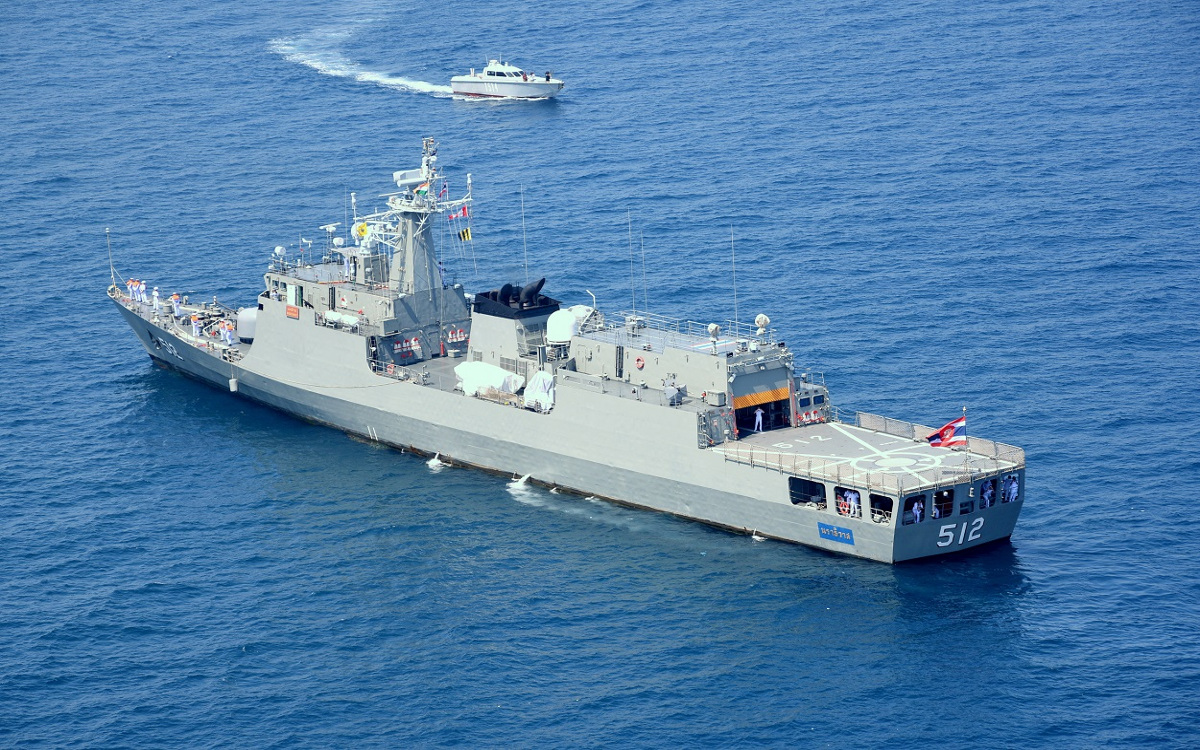
Thai offshore patrol vessel HTMS Naratiwat during Milan 2018 exercise.

=== Patrol craft ===
Class	Origin	Ship	Hull No. /Commissioned	Displacement	Notes
Patrol craft (47 in service)
Chonburi class	Italy	HTMS Chonburi HTMS Songkla	FAC-331/1983 FAC-332/1983	450 tonnes	Armament: 2 × OTO Melara 76 mm/62 compact; 1 × 40 mm/70 Bofors gun; 2 × M2 Browning
M58 class	Thailand	HTMS Laemsing	PC-561/2016	520 tonnes	Armament: 1 × OTO Melara 76 mm/62 compact; 1 × DS-30M; 2 × M2 Browning
Hua Hin class	Thailand	HTMS Huahin HTMS Klang HTMS Sriracha	PC-541/2001 PC-542/2001 PC-543/2001	590 tonnes	Armament: 1 × Mk.22 3"/50 caliber gun; 1 × Bofors 40 mm/60; 2 × M2 Browning
Sattahip class	Thailand	HTMS Sattahip HTMS Klongyai HTMS Takbai HTMS Thepa	PC-521/1983 PC-522/1984 PC-523/1985 PC-525/1985	300 tonnes	locally built based on PSMM Mk.5 Armament: 1 × OTO Melara 76 mm/62 compact or Mk.22 3"/50 caliber gun; 1 × Bofors 40 mm/60; 2 × Oerlikon 20 mm cannon; 2 × M2 Browning
Tor 991 class	Thailand	Tor.991; Tor.992; Tor.993	T.991/2007; T.992/2007; T.993/2007	185 tonnes	Armament: 2 × DS-30M
Tor 994 class	Thailand	Tor.994; Tor.995; Tor.996	T.994/2011; T.995/2011; T.996/2011	223 tonnes	Armament: 1 × DS-30M; 1 × M2 Browning
Tor 997 class	Thailand	Tor.997; Tor.998	T.997/2023; T.998/2023	223 tonnes	Armament: 2 x RWS EM&E Sentinel 30 mm; 1 × M2 Browning
M36 class	Thailand	Tor.111; Tor.112; Tor.113 Tor.114; Tor.115	T.111/2014; T.112/2014; T.113/2014 T.114/2020; T.115/2020	150 tonnes	Armament: 1 × Denel Land Systems GI-2 20 mm autocannon; 1 × DS-30M; 2 × M2 Browning
Tor 227 class	Thailand	Tor.227	T.227/2004	43 tonnes	Armament: 1 × Oerlikon GAM-CO1 20 mm autocannon; 1 × M2 Browning
M21 class	Thailand	Tor.228; Tor.229; Tor.230 Tor.232; Tor.233; Tor.234; Tor.235; Tor.236; Tor.237 Tor.261; Tor.262; Tor.263; Tor.264 Tor.265; Tor.266; Tor.267; Tor.268; Tor.269 Tor.270; Tor.271; Tor.272; Tor.273; Tor.274	T.228/2013; T.229/2013; T.230/2013 T.232/2016; T.233/2016; T.234/2016; T.235/2016; T.236/2016; T.237/2016 T.261/2017; T.262/2017; T.263/2017; T.264/2017 T.265/2018; T.266/2018; T.267/2018; T.268/2018; T.269/2018 T.270/2018; T.271/2018; T.272/2018; T.273/2018; T.274/2018	45 tonnes	Armament: 1 × Denel Land Systems GI-2 20 mm autocannon; 1 × M2 Browning with 81 mm grenade launcher (co-axial type)

=== Training ship ===
Class	Origin	Ship	Hull No. /Commissioned	Displacement	Notes
Training ship / Salute ship (1 in service)
Makut Rajakumarn class	United Kingdom	HTMS Makut Rajakumarn	FF-433/1973	1,900 tonnes	Armament: 2 × 4.5 inch Mark 8 naval gun; 1 × Bofors 40mm/70; 2 × triple torpedo launcher; Ultra Electronics EMS SSM

=== Landing craft utility ===
Class	Origin	Ship	Hull No. /Commissioned	Displacement	Notes
Landing craft utility (9 in service)
M55 class	Thailand	HTMS Mattaphon HTMS Ravi	LCU-784/2010 LCU-785/2010	550 tonnes	Armament: 4 × Oerlikon 20 mm cannon; 2 × 12.7 mm M2HB
Mannok class	Thailand	HTMS Mannok HTMS Mannai HTMS Manklang	LCU-781/2001 LCU-782/2001 LCU-783/2001	550 tonnes	Armament: 2 × Rheinmetall Rh 202
Thongkaeo class	Thailand	HTMS Thongkaeo HTMS Thonglang HTMS Wangnok HTMS Wangnai	LCU-771/1982 LCU-772/1983 LCU-773/1983 LCU-774/1983	396 tonnes	Armament: 2 × Oerlikon 20 mm cannon

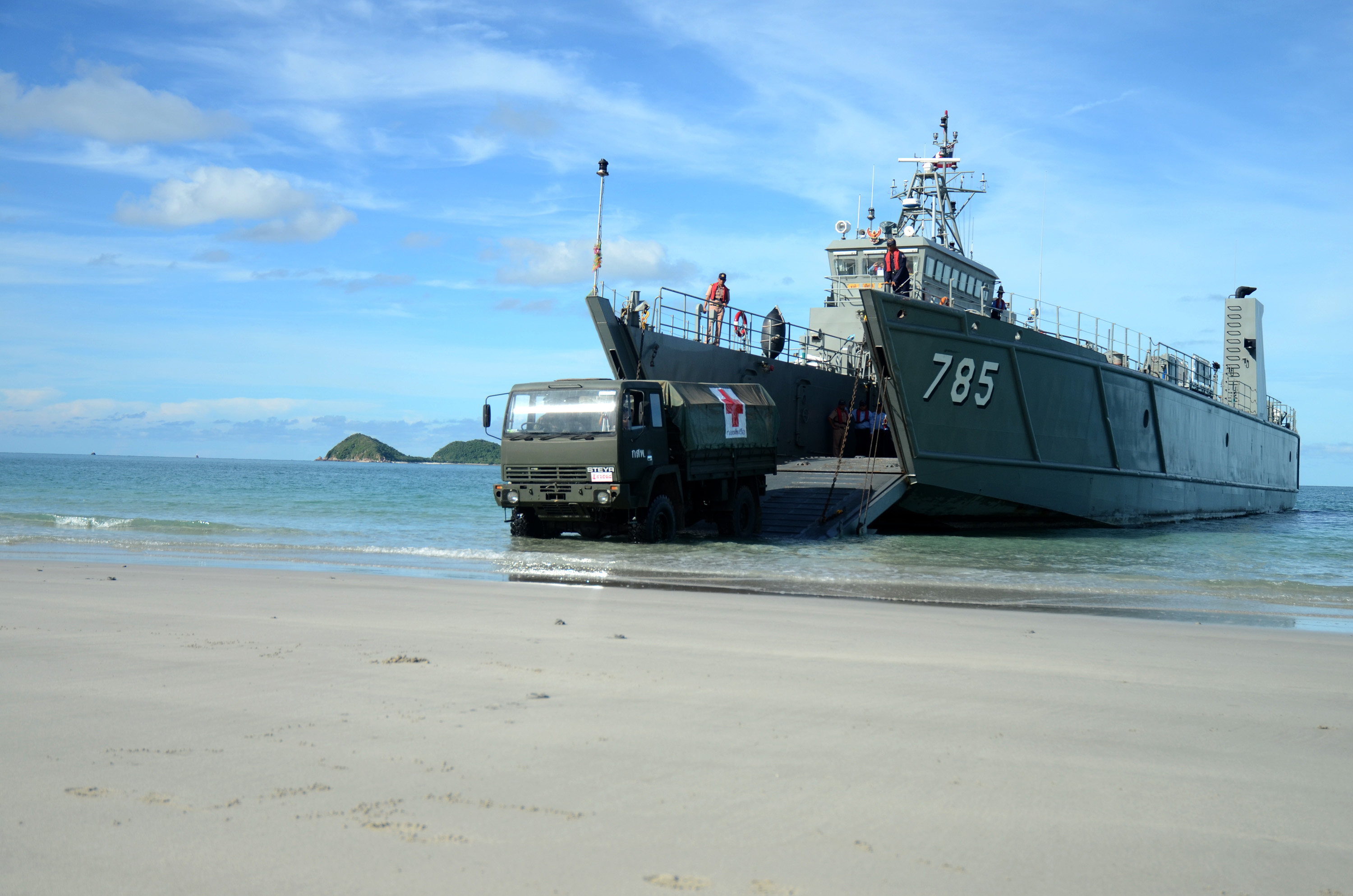
HTMS Ravi during a humanitarian assistance and disaster relief training of CARAT, Thailand 2013.

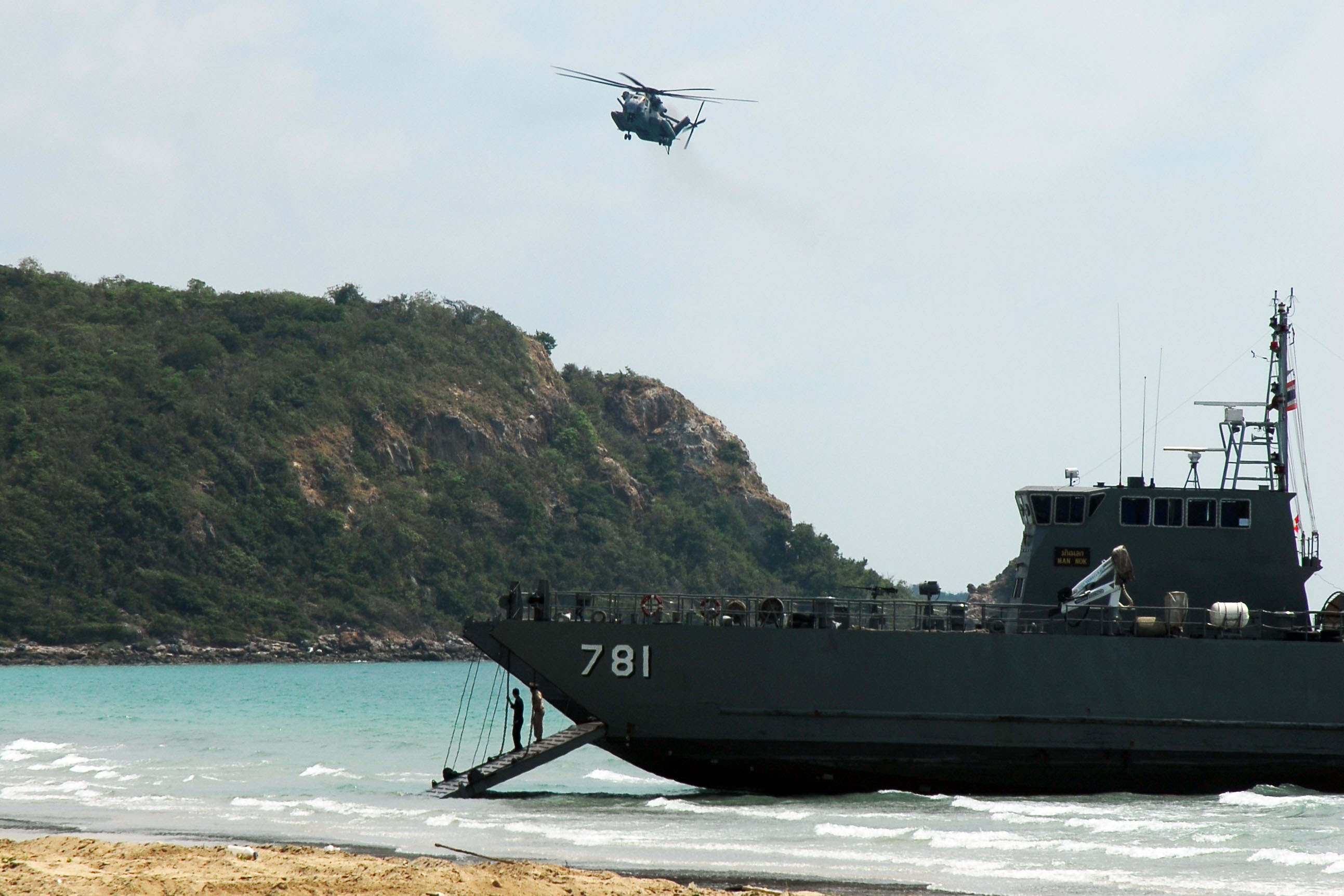
HTMS Mannok during a Cobra Gold 2010 non-combatant evacuation demonstration

=== Replenishment ship ===
Class	Origin	Ship	Hull No. /Commissioned	Displacement	Notes
Replenishment ship (7 in service)
Matra class	Thailand	HTMS Matra	YO-836/2014	500 tonnes	
Proet class	Thailand	HTMS Proet HTMS Samed	YO-834/1969 YO-835/1970	410 tonnes	
Jula class	Singapore	HTMS Jula	YO-831/1980	1,661 tonnes	
Chuang class	Thailand	HTMS Chuang HTMS Chik	YO-841/1966 YO-842/1974	360 tonnes	
Prong class	Thailand	HTMS Prong	YO-833/1941	412 tonnes	

=== Minesweeper ===
Class	Origin	Ship	Hull No. /Commissioned	Displacement	Notes
Minesweeper ship (5 in service)
Thalang class	Thailand	HTMS Thalang	MCS-621/1980	1,095 tonnes	Designed for production in Thailand.
Lat Ya class	Italy	HTMS Lat Ya HTMS Tha Din Daeng	MCS-633/1999 MCS-634/2000	697 tonnes	Thai designation based on Gaeta class.
Bang Rachan class	Germany	HTMS Bangrajun HTMS Nong Sarai	MCS-631/1987 MCS-632/1987	444 tonnes	Thai designation based on M48 class.

=== Research and survey vessel ===
Class	Origin	Ship	Hull No. /Commissioned	Displacement	Notes
Research and survey vessel (2 in service)
Paruehasabordee class	Thailand	HTMS Paruehasabordee	AGOR-813/2008	1,636 tonnes	
Suriya class	Thailand	HTMS Suriya	ABU-822/2026	1,460 tonnes	

=== Tugboat ===
Class	Origin	Ship	Hull No. /Commissioned	Displacement	Notes
Tugboat (6 in service)
Panyee class	Thailand	HTMS Panyee HTMS Lipe HTMS Ta Chai	YTM-857/2017 YTM-858/2020 YTM-859/2023	800 tonnes	
Rin class	Singapore	HTMS Rin	YTM-853/1981	421 tonnes	
Samsan class	Thailand	HTMS Samsan HTMS Rad	YTM-855/1994 YTM-856/1994	385 tonnes	

=== Riverine patrol boat ===
Class	Origin	Hull No.	Type	In service	Notes
Riverine patrol boat (191 in service)
R.21 class	United States	R.21 – R.26	Riverine patrol boat	6	
R.31 class	Thailand	R.31 – R.3129 / R.3133 – R.3135	Riverine patrol boat	132	
R.3130 class	Thailand	R.3130 – R.3132	Riverine patrol boat	3	
R.41 class	United States	R.41-R.43	Riverine patrol boat	3	
R.51 class	United States	R.51-R.56	Riverine patrol boat	6	
Mk II-class PBR	United States	R.11 – R.145	Riverine patrol boat	32	
R.121 class	Thailand	R.121 – R.128	Riverine patrol boat	8	
R.161 class	Thailand	R.161 – R.163	Riverine patrol boat	3	
R.164 class	Thailand	R.164 – R.169	Riverine patrol boat	6	

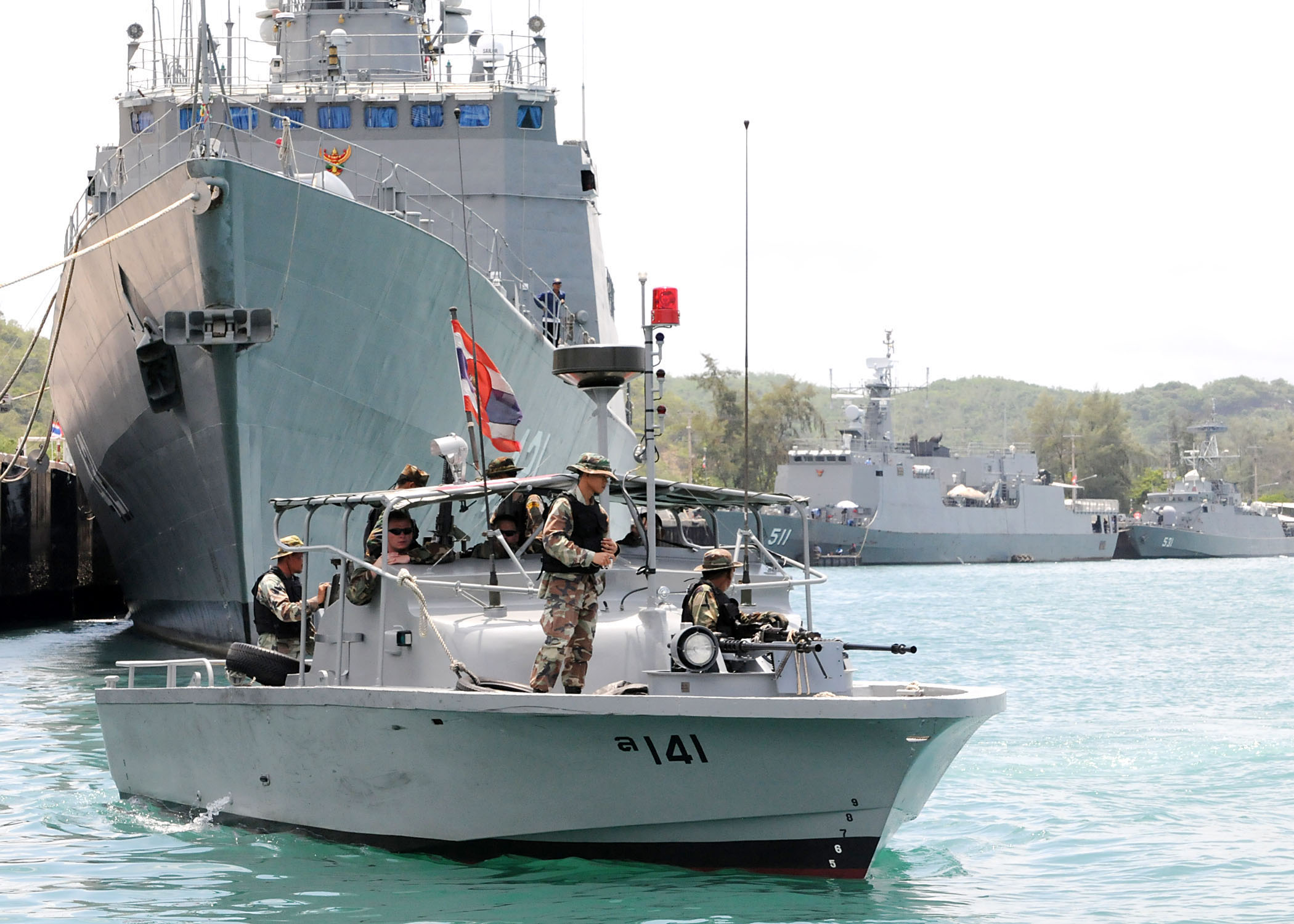
A Royal Thai Navy (RTN) riverine patrol boat. Naresuan, Pattani and Khamronsin are moored in the background.

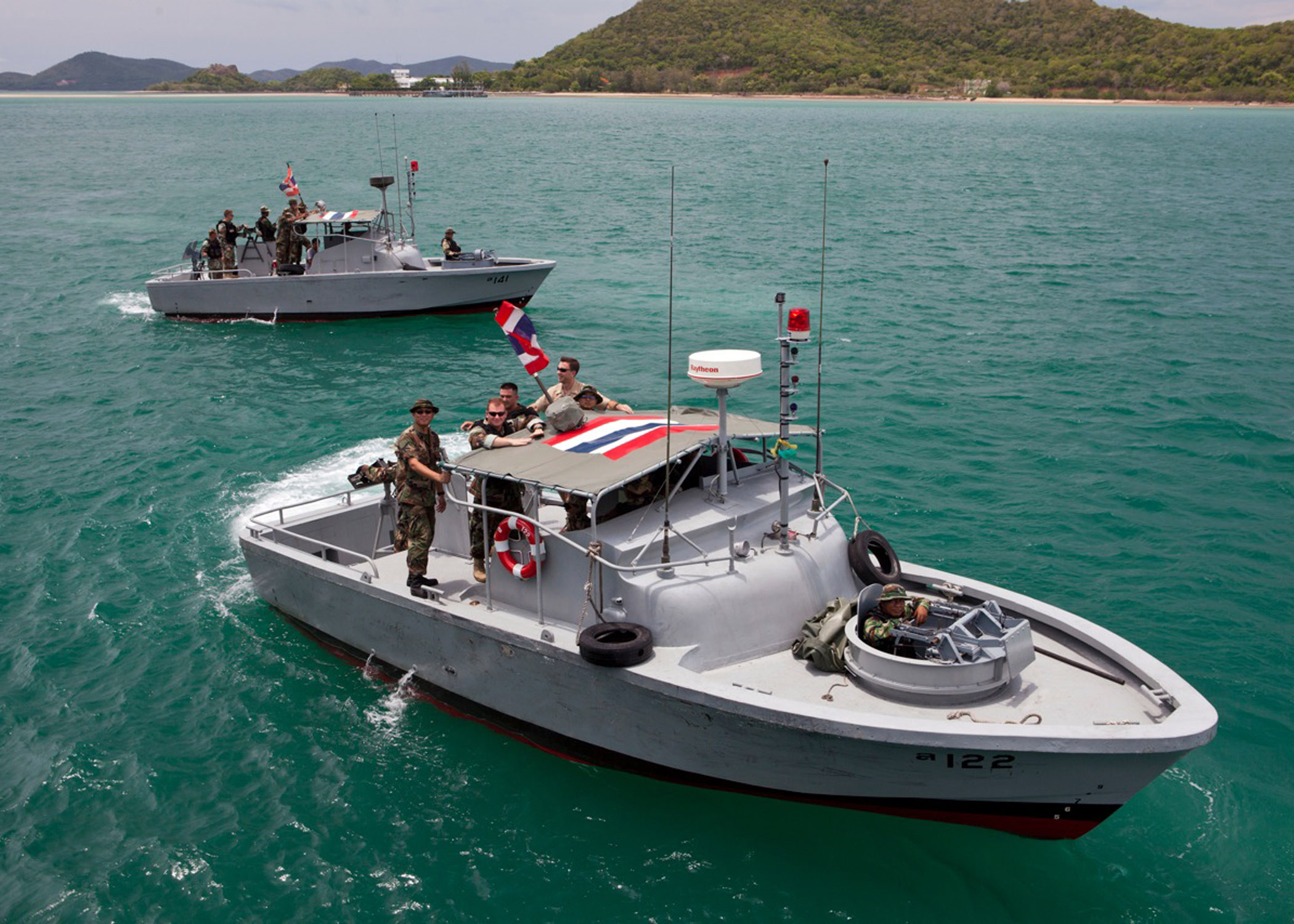
Royal Thai Navy Riverine Sailors on patrol boats during the CARAT 2010 naval exercise.

== Armaments ==
Model	Origin	Type	Notes
Naval Gun
OTO Melara	Italy	76 mm; naval gun	Main Naval gun of RTN fleet
Mk 45	United States	127 mm; naval gun	Mk 45 Mod 2 for Naresuan class
Type 79	China	100 mm; naval gun	For Chao Phraya class
Mk 22	United States	76 mm; naval gun	For the Hua Hin class patrol boat
Mark 8	United Kingdom	113 mm; naval gun	For HTMS Makut Rajakumarn
Auto Cannon Naval Gun
Oerlikon	Switzerland	20 mm; auto cannon gun	Main autocannon of the RTN fleet
Rheinmetall Rh 202	Germany	20 mm; auto cannon gun	
DLS GI-2	South Africa	20 mm; auto cannon gun	Often mounted on patrol craft
Type 76	China	37 mm; auto cannon gun	
Bofors	Sweden	40 mm; auto cannon gun	
Remote Controlled Weapon Station
DS30M	United Kingdom	30 mm; auto cannon gun	Main RCWS of the Royal Thai Navy
Sentinel 30	Spain	30 mm; auto cannon gun	For Tor.997-998 and HTMS Chang
Close-in Weapon System
Phalanx	United States	20mm Gun CIWS	Bhumibol Adulyadej-class frigate
DARDO	Italy	40mm Gun CIWS	For Ratanakosin class corvette
Anti-Submarine Armament
Yu-8	China	Anti-submarine torpedo	Yu-8 533mm for S26T submarine
Mark 46	United States	Anti-submarine torpedo	Main Torpedo of the RTN fleet, may be replaced by the Mk54
Mark 54	United States	Anti-submarine torpedo	Used on the Bhumibol Adulyadej-class frigate, will most likely become the RTN fleet’s main torpedo in the future
Type 86	China	Anti-submarine mortar	For Chao Phraya class
Heavy Machine Gun
M2HB	United States	Heavy machine gun	Main Heavy machine gun in RTN fleet
Surface to Air Missile
Selenia Aspide	Italy	Surface-to-air missile	24 ordered in 1984 for use on Ratanakosin-class corvette
RIM-162 ESSM	United States	Surface-to-air missile	Nine on order (Plan 64), Bhumibol Adulyadej-class frigate and Naresuan-class frigate
Mistral	France	Surface-to-air missile	For SADRAL launchers on HTMS Chakri Naruebet
Anti-Ship Missile
Harpoon	United States	Anti-ship missile	Main Anti-ship missile of RTN fleet
C-708UNA	China	Anti-ship missile	For S26T submarines
C-802A	China	Anti-ship missile	For modernized Chao Phraya class
Naval Mine
Mk.6	United States	Naval mine	Mk6 mod 5
Mk.18	United States	Naval mine	
Mi 9	Thailand	Stealth naval mine	
Mi 11	Thailand	Stealth naval mine	

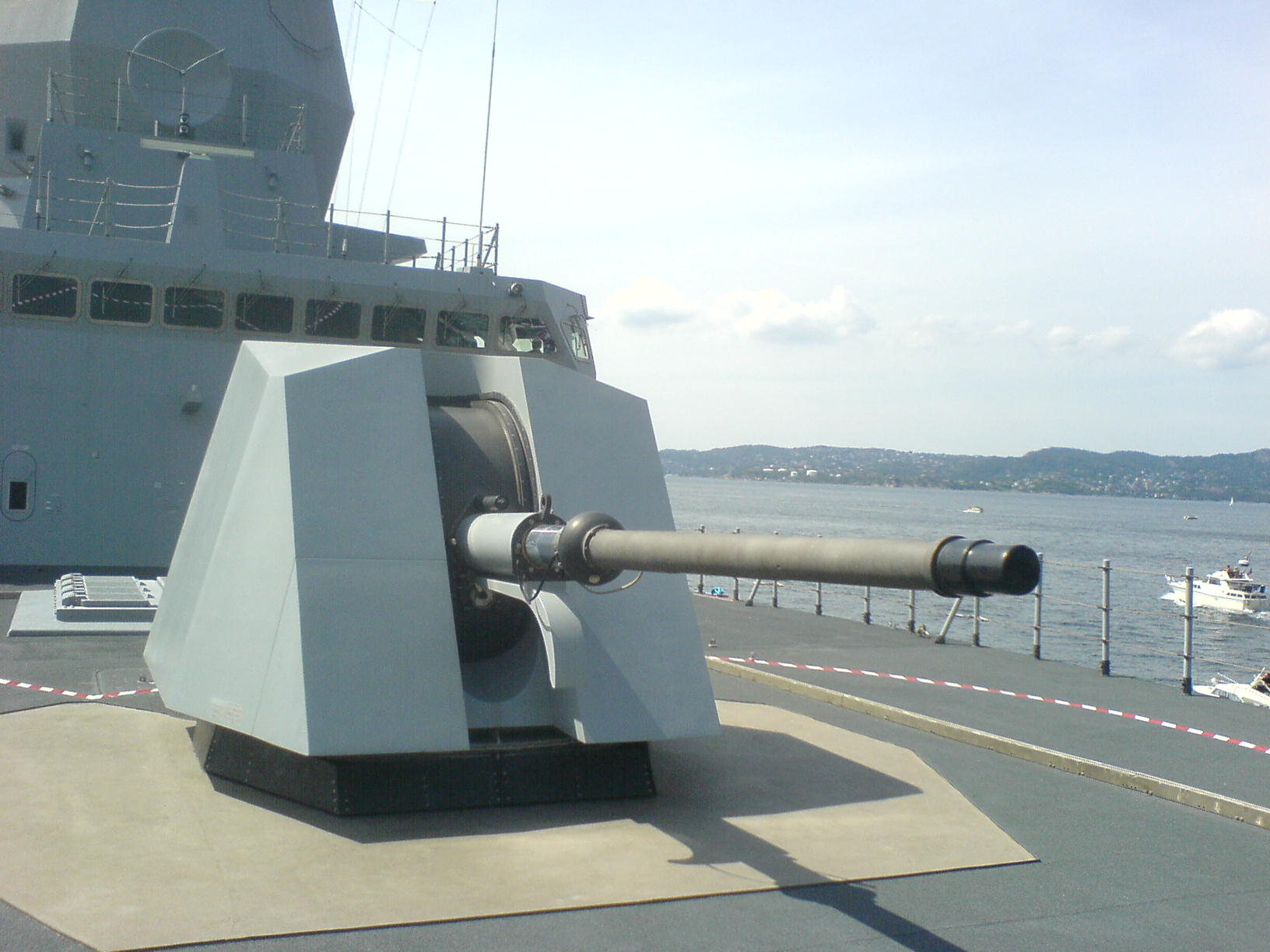
OTO Melara 76 mm

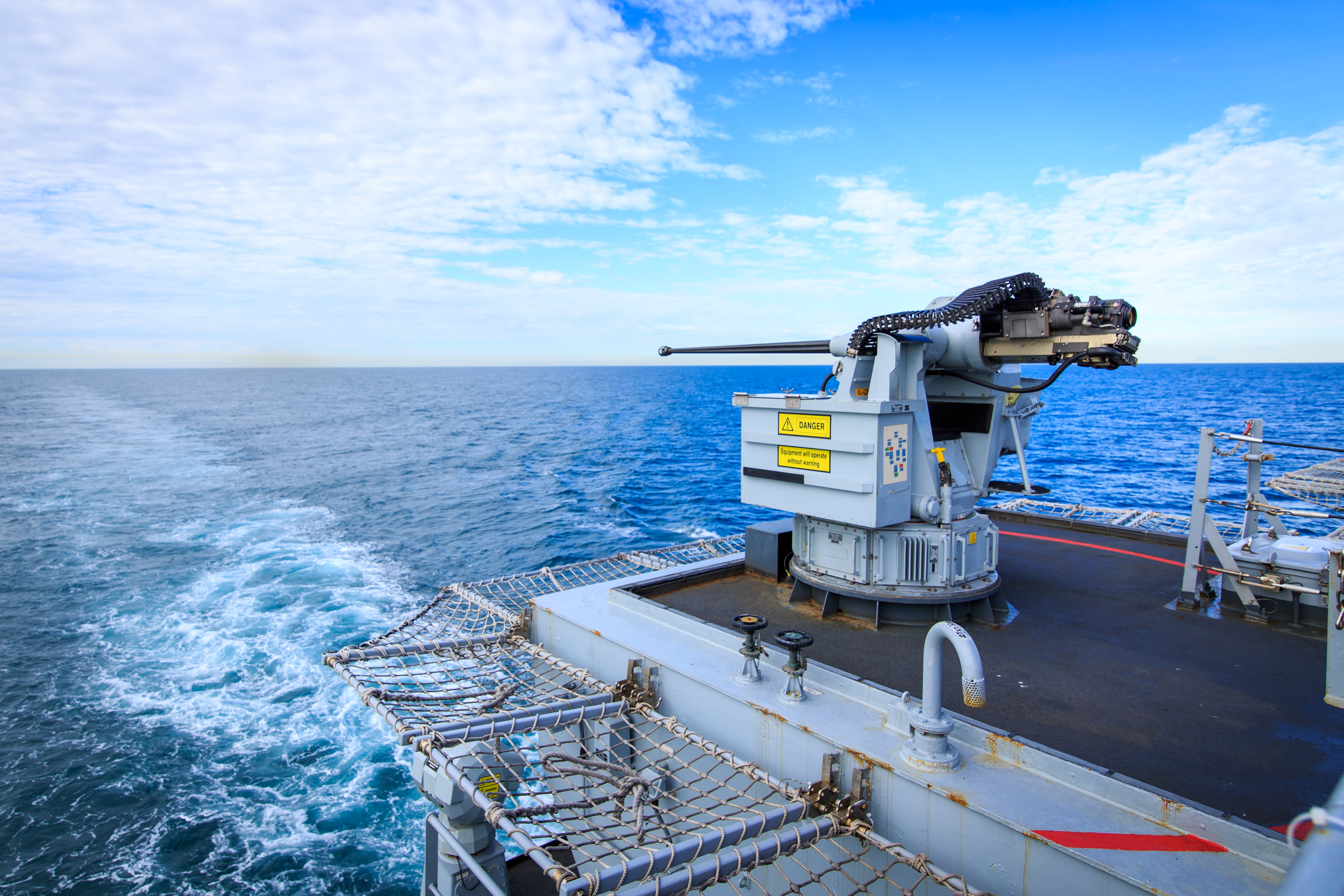
DS30M

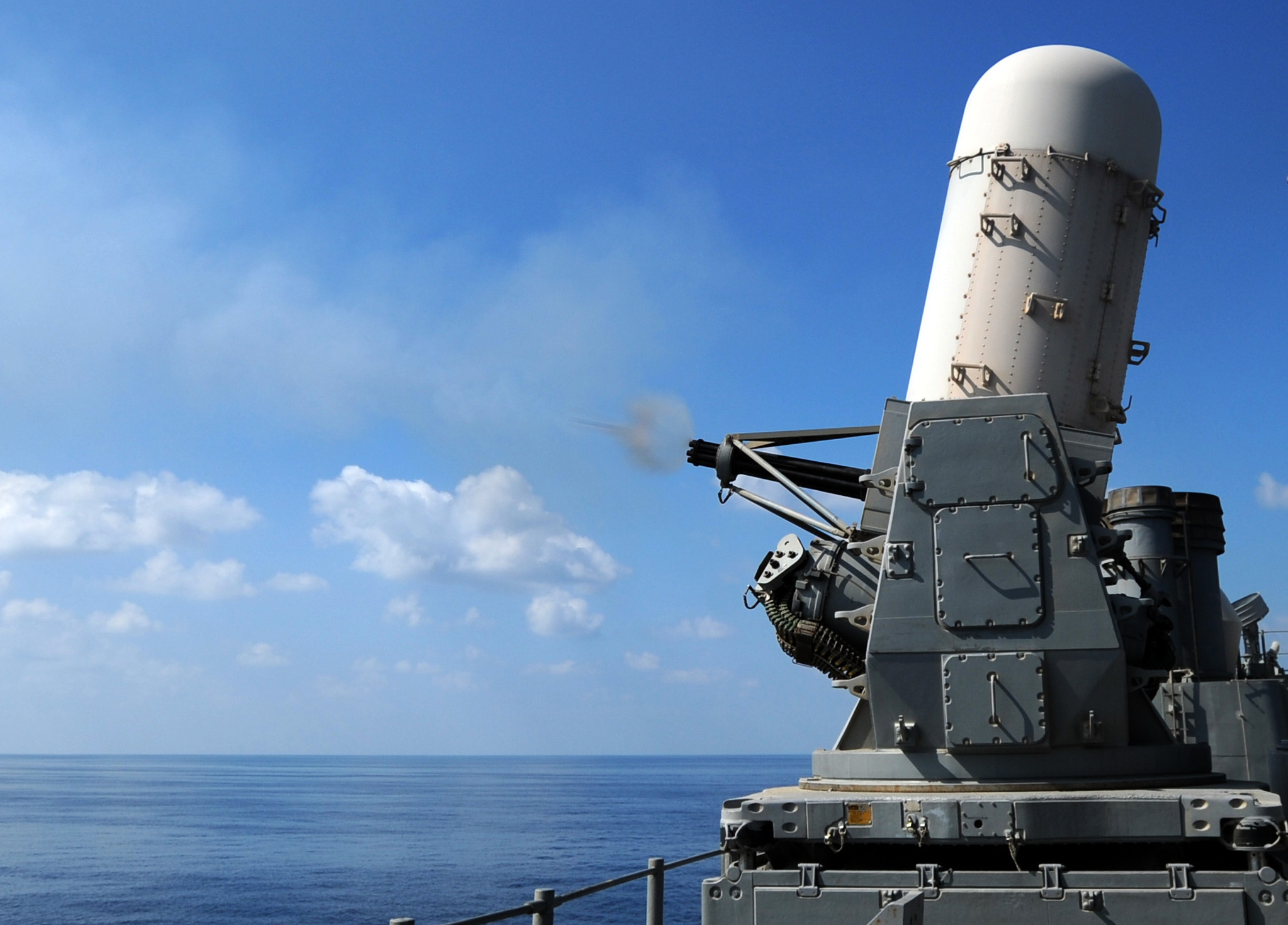
Phalanx CIWS

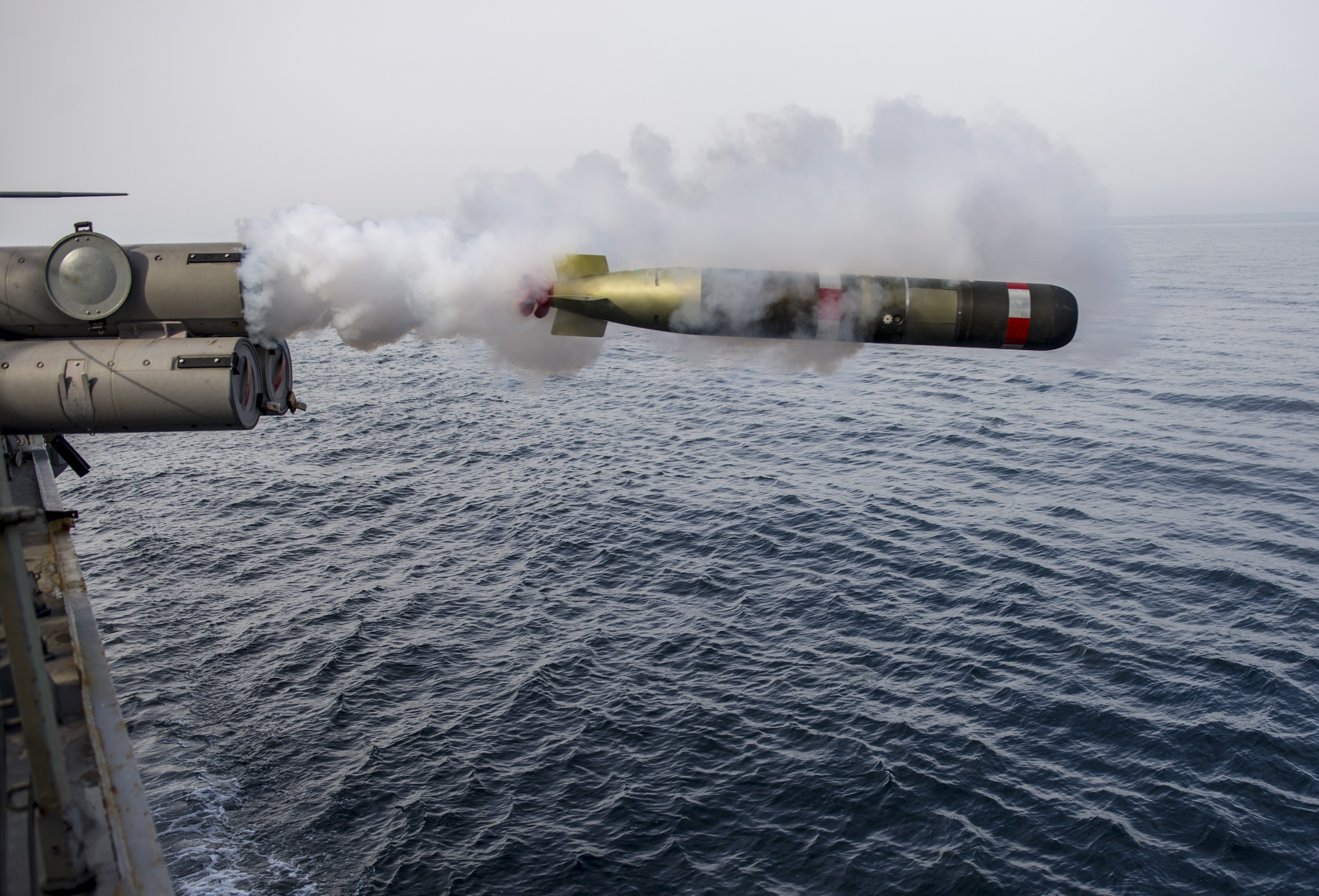
Mk 54 torpedo

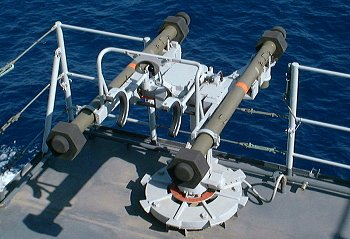
Mistral missile

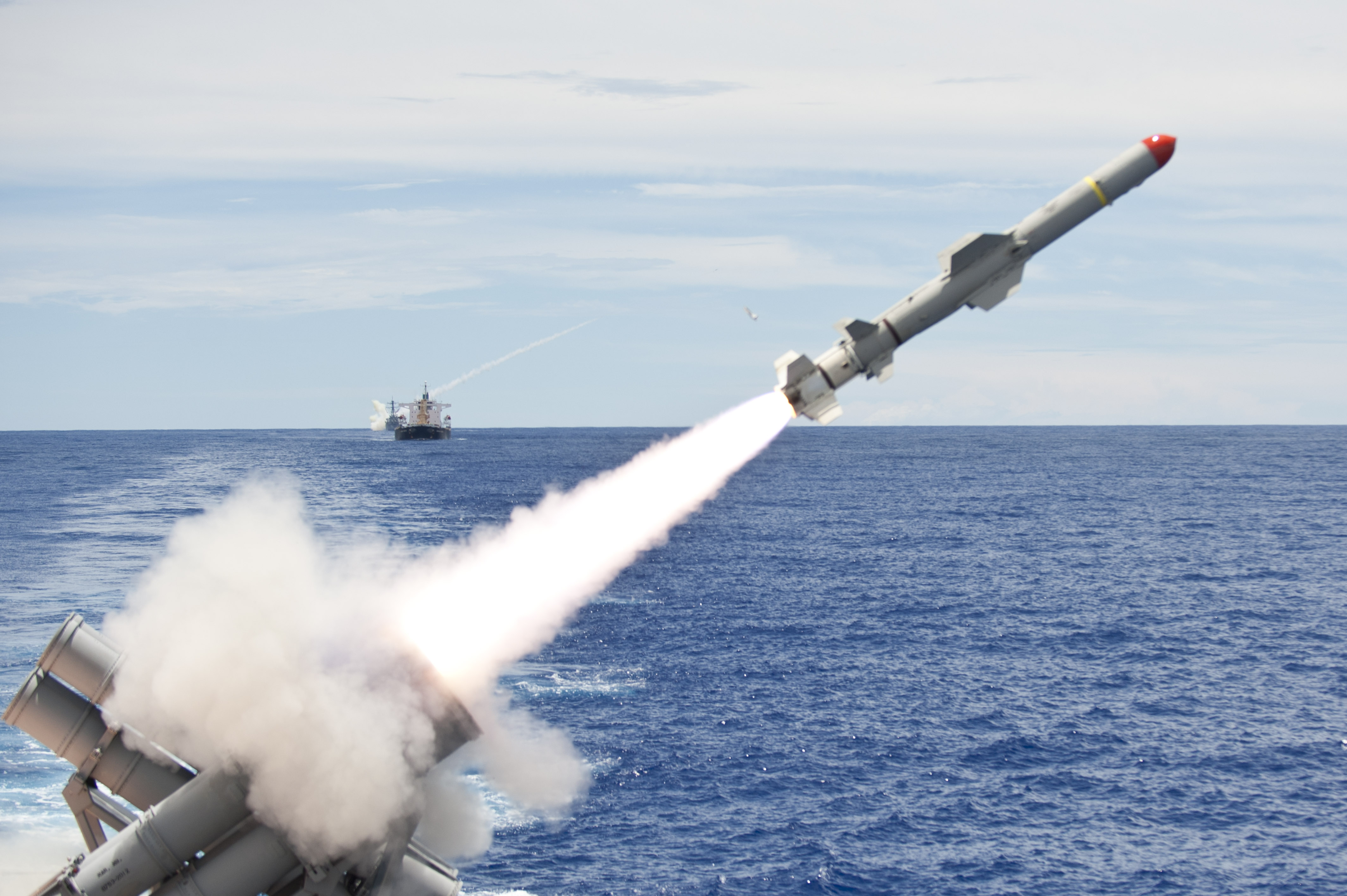
Harpoon missile

== Aircraft ==
Related article:Royal Thai Naval Air Division

Model	Origin	Type	Number	Notes
Fixed Wing
Airbus C295	France	Search and rescue	2	On order.
Dornier 228	Germany	MPA	7	
Cessna 337 Super Skymaster	United States	FAC aircraft	4 3 2	H-SP SP G
F-27	Netherlands	Transport	2	
ERJ-135	Brazil	Transport	2	
Helicopter
S-70B/MH-60S	United States	ASW, Multi-Mission	8	6 S-70B-7 and 2 MH-60S
Super Lynx	United Kingdom	ASuW	2	
H-145	France	Utility	5	
UH-1N Twin Huey	United States	Utility	6	
S-76	United States	Utility	5	
Surveillance Unmanned Aerial Vehicles
Aeronautics Orbiter 3B	Israel	Surveillance Unmanned Aerial Vehicles	6	In use since 2020.
Elbit Hermes 900	Israel	Surveillance Unmanned Aerial Vehicles	7	Ordered in 2022.
Boeing Insitu RQ-21 Blackjack	United States	Surveillance Unmanned Aerial Vehicles	5	[Documented by a few sources, not yet seen].
DTI D-Eyes 02	Thailand	Surveillance Unmanned Aerial Vehicles	Unknown	It is unknown whether they are only in the army service. (In use since 2017.)
VTOL Surveillance Unmanned Aerial Vehicles
TOP Falcon-V	China; Thailand	VTOL Surveillance Unmanned Aerial Vehicles	Unknown	In use since 2017.
Narai 3.0	Thailand	VTOL Surveillance Unmanned Aerial Vehicles	20+	In use since 2018. (In use with the Navy and Armed Forces HQ).
Schiebel Camcopter S-100	Austria	VTOL Surveillance Unmanned Aerial Vehicles	6	In use since 2020.
NRDO MARCUS-B	Thailand	VTOL Surveillance Unmanned Aerial Vehicles	2	In use since 2020. (For use on board the Chakri Naruebet aircraft carrier).

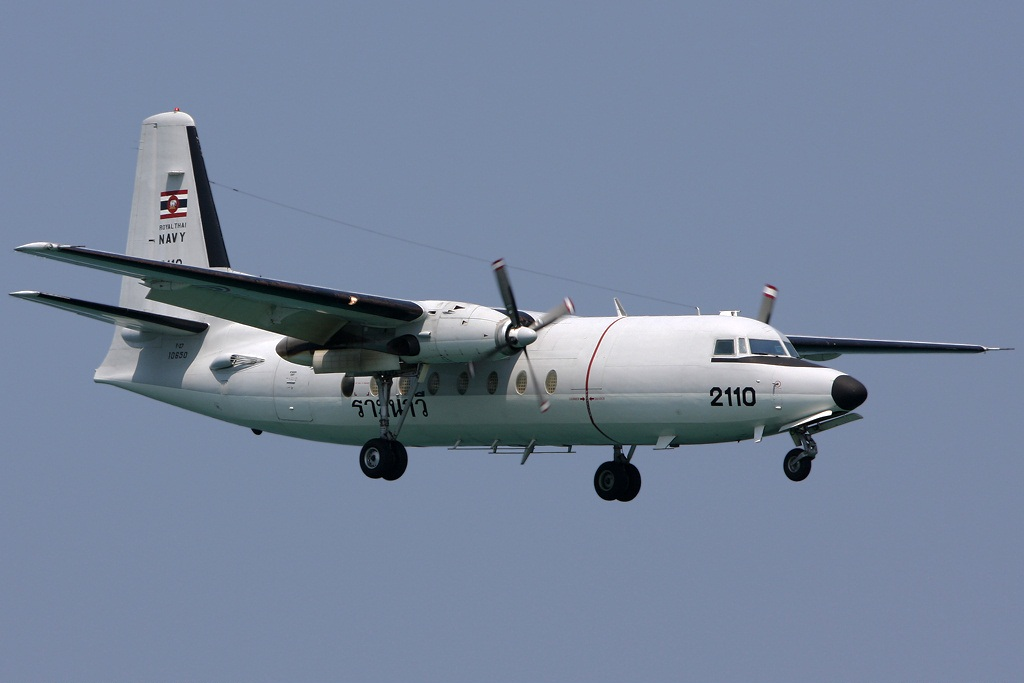
Royal Thai Navy Fokker27-MK 400

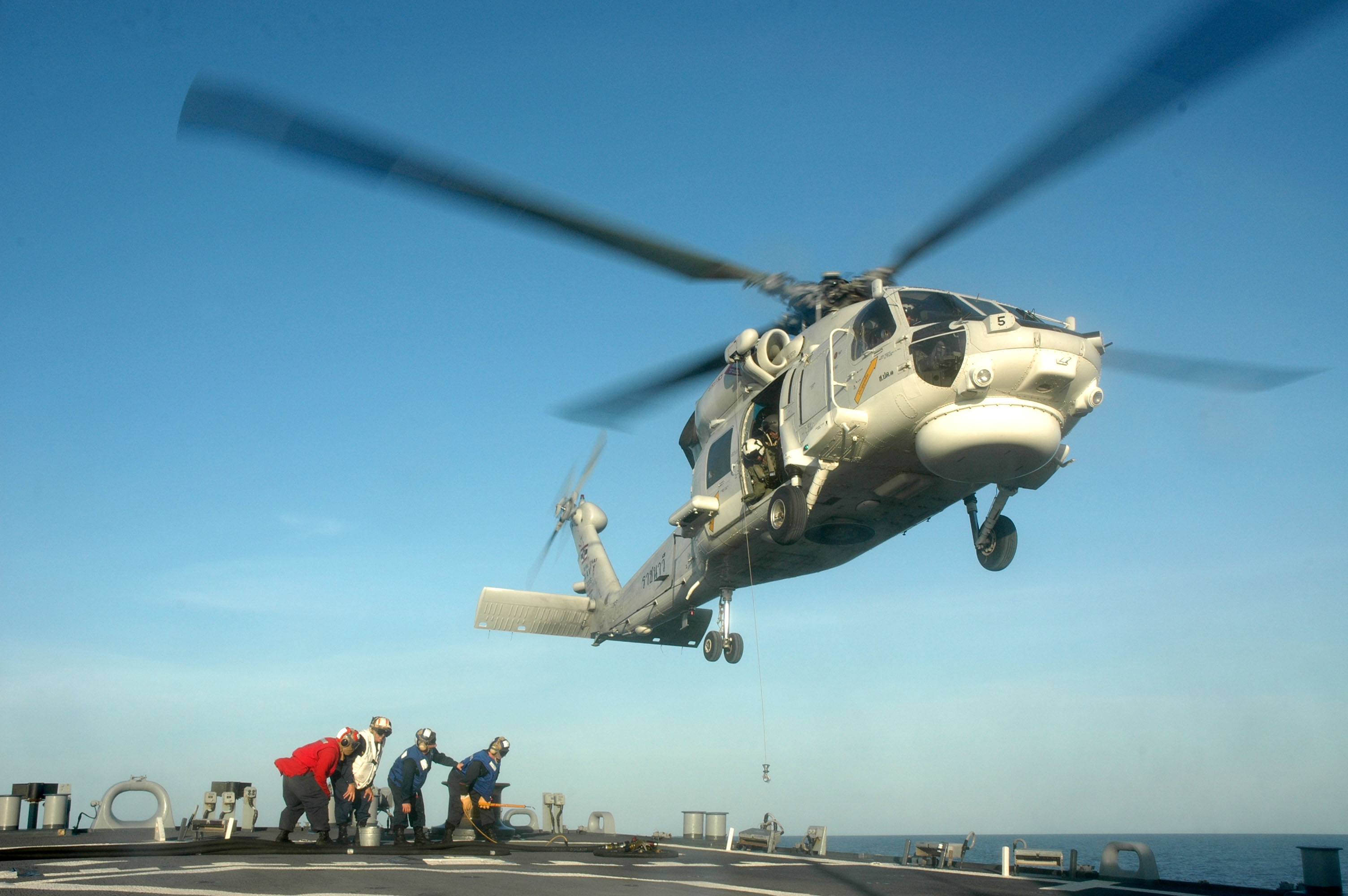
Thai Navy S-70B Seahawk

== Navy Infantry weapons ==
Related article: List of equipment in Royal Thai Marine Corps
Related article: List of equipment in RECON battalion
Related article: List of equipment in Royal Thai Navy SEALs team

Model	Origin	Type	Caliber	Notes
Pistols
M1911	USA; Thailand	Semi-automatic pistol	.45 ACP	Thai M1911A1 pistols produced under license; locally known as the Type 86 pistol (ปพ.86).
Assault rifles
M16A1/A2/A4	USA; Thailand	Assault rifle	5.56×45mm NATO	
CQ-A	China	Assault rifle	5.56×45mm NATO	Type CQ is an unlicensed Chinese variant of the M16 rifle which is manufactured by Norinco.
Grenade launcher
M203	United States	Grenade launcher	40 mm	

== Historical equipment ==
=== Ships ===
Class	Country of Origin	Ship	Service	Note
Light cruiser
Naresuan class	Italy	HTMS Naresuan (I) HTMS Taksin (I)	Cancelled Cancelled	The Etna class was one of the first anti-aircraft cruisers built in Italy. Originally ordered by Siam (now Thailand), it was laid down in 1939. Named Naresuan and Taksin, both were equipped with six 15.2 cm guns. In 1942 the ships were seized by Italy to use as anti-aircraft cruisers, and renamed Etna and Vesuvio. The ships were under construction in Trieste when they were captured by German troops after the surrender of Italy on 10 September 1943. To prevent its use by the Germans, the ships were sunk by the retreating Italians. About 60% complete, the Germans never intended to continue construction. After the war, they were found scuttled in Trieste harbor, refloated, and scrapped.
Coastal defence ship
Thonburi class	Japan	HTMS Thonburi HTMS Sri Ayudhya	1938–1941 1938–1951	HTMS Thonburi ran aground in the Battle of Ko Chang. Later she was raised and attempts were made to repair the extensive damage and continued to serve the navy as a training vessel until being stricken in 1959. Part of her bridge and forward gun turret are preserved as a memorial at the Royal Thai Naval Academy. After her decommissioning, her sister HTMS Sri Ayudhya became the navy’s flagship and most powerful vessel, until 1951 when she was used in the Manhattan Rebellion and sunk by Air Force Aircraft and Coastal Batteries.
Ratanakosin class (l)	United Kingdom	HTMS Ratanakosin (l) HTMS Sukhothai (l)	1929–1969 1929–1972	Both ships’ figureheads are on display at the Royal Thai Navy Museum.
Submarine
Matchanu class	Japan	HTMS Matchanu HTMS Wirun HTMS Sinsamut HTMS Phlai-Chumphon	1937–1951 1937–1951 1938–1951 1938–1951	All sold to the Siam Cement company for scrap after the Manhattan Rebellion. Part of the superstructure of the Matchanu is preserved at the Naval Museum in Samut Prakan Province, Thailand.
Destroyer
R class	United Kingdom	HTMS Phra Ruang	1920–1957	Former HMS Radiant and Thailand’s first modern warship.
Cannon Class	United States	HTMS Pin Klao	1959-2025	Former USS Hemminger, mostly used as a training and salute ship. Decommissioned in 2025, the last of its class to do so.
Frigate
Tacoma class	United States	HTMS Prasae (II) HTMS Tachin (II)	1951–2000 1951–2000	Both used in Korean War
Knox class	United States	HTMS Phutthaloetla Naphalai HTMS Phutthayotfa Chulalok	1997–2015	Ex-USS Ouellet (1970–1993) Ex-USS Truett
Sloop-of-war
Maeklong class	Japan	HTMS Maeklong HTMS Tachin (I)	1937–1995 1937–1951	Maeklong is preserved in Samut Prakan Province, Thailand. Tachin was bombed by French aircraft in the Franco-Thai War which led to its earlier decommissioning.
Aberdare class	United Kingdom	HTMS Chao Phraya (I)	1922–1971	Former HMS Havant
Corvette
Flower class	United Kingdom	HTMS Bangpakong (I) HTMS Prasae (I)	1947–1985 1947–1951	Used in Korean War. Ran aground in the Korean War.
Ratanakosin (II)	United States	HTMS Sukhothai (II)	1987–2022	Sank in a storm on 18 December 2022.
Tapi class	United States	HTMS Tapi HTMS Khirirat	1971-2022 1974-2026	Retired in 2022 and 2026 respectively.
Torpedo boat
Chonbori class (I)	Italy	HTMS Chonbori (I) HTMS Trat (I) HTMS Songkhla (I) HTMS Phuket (I) HTMS Pattani (I) HTMS Surat Thani(I) HTMS Chanthaburi (I) HTMS Rayong (I) HTMS Chumphon (I)	1938–1941 1937–1975 1938–1941 1937–1975 1937–1978 1938–1978 1938–1976 1938–1976 1938–1975	HTMS Chonbori (I) and HTMS Songkhla (I) were sunk in the Battle of Ko Chang. Most of the others were sunk as target ships or scrapped. HTMS Chumphon (I) on display as a memorial near Prince of Chumphon Shrine at Sairee Beach, Chumphon Province, Thailand, since 1980.
Kyongyai class (I)	Japan	HTMS Kyongyai (I) HTMS Kantan (I) HTMS Takbai (I)	1937–1976 1937–1976 1937–1973	
ASW patrol craft
PC-461 class	United States	HTMS Sarasin (II) HTMS Thayanchon (II) HTMS Khamronsin (I) HTMS Phali HTMS Sukiep HTMS Tongpliu HTMS Liulom HTMS Longlom (I)	1947–1992 1947–1982 1947–1953 1947–1992 1948–1991 1952–1993 1951–1994 1952–1984	Former USS PC-495. Former USS PC-575. Former USS PC-609. Former USS PC-1185. Former USS PC-1218. Former USS PC-616. Former USS PC-1253. Former USS PC-570.
Patrol Craft/ Fast Attack Craft
BMB-230 class	Italy	HTMS Ratcharit; HTMS Wittayakom; HTMS U-domdej	1979–2016	
FPB-45 class	Germany	HTMS Prabporapak; HTMS Hanhak Sudtru; HTMS Soo Pirin	1976–2018	Similar to Singapore Navy's Seawolf-class missile gunboats (a design based on Germany's Lürssen TNC45 FAC)
Sarasin class (I)	Thailand	HTMS Sarasin (I) HTMS Thiew Uthock HTMS Travane Vari	1937–1945 1937–1960 1937–1951	HTMS Sarasin (I) sunk by British aircraft HTMS Travane Vari sunk in Manhattan Rebellion.
Sattahip class	Thailand	HTMS Taimuang HTMS Kantang	1983-2024 1984-2024	
Chonburi class	Italy	HTMS Phuket	1983-2025	Sister ships HTMS Chonburi and HTMS Songkla expected to follow in the near future
Amphibious warfare ships, landing ships, landing craft
LST-542 class	United States	HTMS Angthong (II) HTMS Chang (II) HTMS Phangan (II) HTMS Lanta HTMS Prathong	1947–2006 1962–2006 1972–2008 1973–2009 1975–2009	Former USS LST-924. Former USS Lincoln County (LST-898). Former USS Stark County (LST-1134). Used in the Vietnam War. Former USS Stone County (LST-1141). Former USS Dodge County (LST-722).
LSM-1 class	United States	HTMS Kut HTMS Phai HTMS Kram	1946–2003 1947–2004 1962–2002	Former USS LSM-338. Former USS LSM-333. Former USS LSM-469.
LCT mark 6	United States	HTMS Mattaphon (I) HTMS Ravi (I) HTMS Adang HTMS Phetra HTMS Khorum HTMS Talibong	1946–2008 1946–2008 1946–2008 1948–2008 1947–2008 1947–2008	Former USS LCU-8. Former USS LCU-9. Former USS LCU-10. Former USS LCU-11. Former USS LCU-12. Former USS LCU-13.
LCI-351 class	United States	HTMS Prab HTMS Sattakut	1950–2007 1950–2007	Former USS LCI-670. Former USS LCI-739.
LCS(L)(3)-1 class	United States	HTMS Nakha	1966–2007	Former USS LCS(L)(3)-102/ JMSDF Himawari.
Minesweepers
Bangrajun class (l)	Italy	HTMS Bangrajun (I) HTMS Nong Sarai (I)	1938–1980 1938–1980	
YMS-1 class	United States	HTMS Ladya (I) HTMS Bangkeo (I) HTMS Tha Din Daeng (I)	1947–1964 1947–1964 1947–1964	Former USS YMS-334. Former USS YMS-138. Former USS YMS-353.
MSC-294 class	United States	HTMS Ladya (II) HTMS Tha Din Daeng (II)	1963–1995 1965–1992	Former USS MSC-297. Former USS MSC-301.
Algerine class	United Kingdom	HTMS Phosamton (I)	1947–2012	Former HMS Minstrel
Transport support ships
Angthong class (l)	Japan	HTMS Angthong (I)	1918–1951	Former HTMS Pratenung Mahachakri (II)
Chang class (l)	?	HTMS Chang (I)	1902–1962	
Sichang class (l)	Italy	HTMS Sichang (I) HTMS Phangan (I)	1938–1983 1938–1961	
Jula class (l)	?	HTMS Jula (I)	1941–1953	
Kledkaeo class (II)	Norway	HTMS Kledkaeo	1956–2014	Former RNoMS Norfrost
Replenishment ships
Samui class (l)	Italy	HTMS Samui (I)	1936–1945	Sunk by USS Sealion.
Samui class (II)	United States	HTMS Samui (II)	1947–2025	
Similan class	China	HTMS Similan	1996–2026	
Tug Boat
Rin class	Singapore	HTMS Rung	1981–2022	

=== Research and survey vessel ===
Class	Origin	Ship	Hull No. /Commissioned	Displacement	Notes
Chantra class	Thailand	HTMS Chantra	AGOR-811/ 1961-2026	966 tonnes	
Suk class	Thailand	HTMS Suk	AGOR-812/ 1981-2026	1,526 tonnes	

=== Armaments ===
Model	Origin	Type	Service	Quantity	Notes
Sea Cat	United Kingdom	Surface-to-air missile	1973–1988	15	For Rajakumarn frigate
Gabriel missile	Israel	Anti-ship missile	1977–2018	30	For TNC-45 (Prabporapak) FAC
C-801	China	Anti-ship missile	1991–2009	50	Initially used on the Chao Phraya Class Frigates before their armament was upgraded
Exocet	France	Anti-ship missile	1980–2019	25	For BMB-230 (Ratcharit) FAC
Hedgehog	United Kingdom	Anti-submarine mortar	1959-2025	3	For HTMS Pin Klao and Former Flower-Classes

=== Aircraft ===
Model	Origin	Type	Service	Quantity	Notes
Avro 504N	Thailand United Kingdom	Trainer	1929–1948	2	Built locally.
WS-103S	Japan	Reconnaissance	1938–1946	6	
Nakajima E8N	Japan	Reconnaissance	1938–1946	27	
Aichi E13A	Japan	Reconnaissance	1939-1945+	6	Three aircraft ordered in 1939 and three in 1941.
Beechcraft 35 Bonanza	United States	Reconnaissance	1948–1951	3	
Piper Pa-11	United States	Reconnaissance	1949–1951	2	
Fairey Firefly	United Kingdom	Fighter	1951-1951	12	10 F Mk. 1 and 2 T Mk. 2
de Havilland Tiger Moth	United Kingdom	Trainer	1951-1951	30	
Curtiss SB2C Helldiver	United States	Bomber	1951–1955	6	
Grumman HU-16D	United States	SAR	1962–1981	3	
Grumman S-2 Tracker	United States	ASW	1966–1999	12	
Cessna O-1G Bird Dog	United States	Reconnaissance	1968–1997	8	
Cessna U-17	United States	Reconnaissance	1974–1997	8	
Bell 205 UH-1H	United States	Utility helicopter	1975–1999	4	
Douglas C-47 Skytrain	United States	Military transport	1978–1999	13	
Canadair CL-215	Canada	SAR	1978–2014	2	
GAF N.24A Normad	Australia	Military transport	1984–2015	5	
Fokker F27-200MAR	Netherlands	Military transport	1984-2023	3	
Bell 214ST	United States	Utility helicopter	1987–2010	5	
LTV A-7E Corsair II	United States	Attack	1995–2007	21	All airframes stored.
Lockheed P-3 Orion	United States	ASW	1996–2014	5	Second-hand but modernized before delivery
Hawker Siddeley AV-8S Matador	United Kingdom	Attack	1997–2006	9	Second hand from the Spanish Navy Used on HTMS Chakri Naruebet.

== Future equipment ==
=== Procurement plans ===
The Thai navy has been lobbying for submarines for years. In January 2017 the Thai National Legislative Assembly tacitly approved the expenditure of 13.5 billion baht (US$383 million) to buy one Chinese S26T submarine, a derivative of China's Yuan Class Type 039A submarine. The S26T submarines are diesel-powered with a displacement of 2,400–3,000 tonnes. It is projected to be the first of a three-boat, US$1 billion acquisition. The cabinet approved one submarine purchase on 18 April 2017 with a budget of 13.5 billion baht (US$393 million), including weapons systems, spare parts and technology transfer. The sub is expected to be delivered in about 2023. The Thai navy's submarine squadron has trained in Germany and South Korea but has no submarines—its last sub was decommissioned in 1950. It does have a submarine headquarters: in July 2014 a US$17.3 million submarine headquarters and training center was opened at the Thai navy's largest port in Sattahip. Prime Minister Prayut Chan-o-cha has explained that Thailand will buy submarines, "not for battle, but so that others will be in awe of us." Deputy Prime Minister and Defence Minister Gen Prawit Wongsuwon said that "...growing territorial threats and an increasing number of maritime missions has prompted the navy to strengthen its submarine units." There are plans to base one submarine at Mahidol Adulyadej Naval Dockyard in Sattahip District, Chonburi, one at a submarine dockyard off the Sattahip coastline, and one on the Andaman coast, in either Krabi or Phang Nga.

The Royal Thai Navy also plans to purchase four more high-performance frigates by the year 2037. The first steps to implement this have just concluded as of October 2026, with Hanwha Ocean being rewarded a contract to build Thailand’s next frigate, with domestic participation a key factor. However, controversies and difficulties during the selection process have led to the program being paused for now as the issues are resolved.

==== Future fleet ====
Vessel	Origin	Asset	Type	Class	Displacement	Status	Notes
Submarine
Type S26T	China	-	Submarine	Matchanu class (Yuan class modified)	2,600 tonnes	Currently being constructed	(1 boat approved and another 2 boats cancelled)
Frigate
HTMS Ananda Mahidol (FFG 472)	Spain Turkey South Korea Singapore	Alfa 3000 AS-3600 I-class Ocean 40F HDF-4000TH Formidable Vanguard 120	Frigate	Multi-role stealth frigate	4,000 tonnes	Hanwha Ocean has announced it has been notified of its selection as the preferred bidder.	On 18 November 2026 the bidding was restarted.

== See also ==
- Royal Thai Marine Corps
- Air and Coastal Defence Command
- Royal Thai Naval Air Division
