= HTMS Pattani =

Thai naval offshore patrol vessel

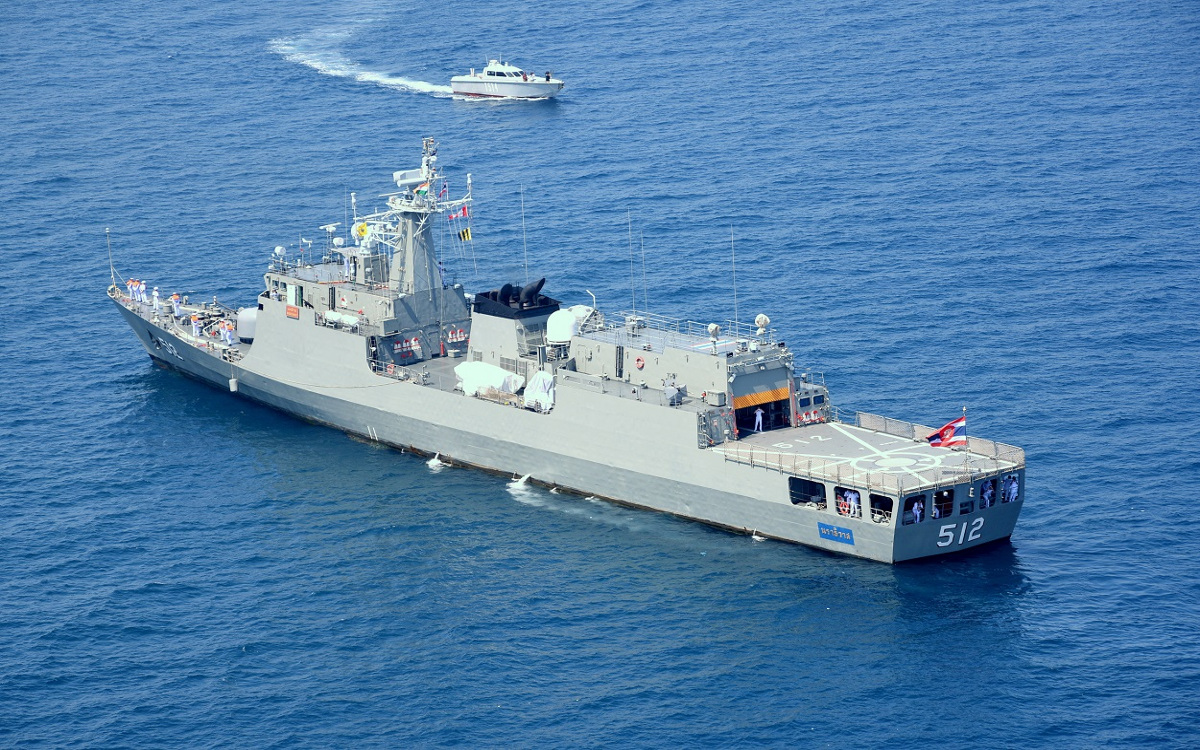
- HTMS Narathiwat (512) during Milan 2018 exercise

History

Thailand
- Name: HTMS Pattani
- Namesake: Pattani Province
- Operator: Royal Thai Navy
- Builder: China State Shipbuilding Corporation, Shanghai
- Commissioned: 2005
- Identification: IMO number: 9291808
- Status: In service

General characteristics
- Class & type: Pattani-class offshore patrol vessel
- Displacement: 1,440 long tons (1,460 t) full load
- Length: 95.5 m (313 ft 4 in)
- Beam: 11.6 m (38 ft 1 in)
- Draft: 3.0 m (9 ft 10 in)
- Propulsion: 2 × Ruston16RK270 diesel engines, driving two shafts with controllable pitch propellers
- Speed: 25 knots (46 km/h; 29 mph)
- Range: 3,500 nmi (6,500 km; 4,000 mi) at 15 kn (28 km/h; 17 mph)
- Complement: 84
- Sensors & processing systems: 1 × Selex RAN-30X/I multimode surveillance radar with IFF; 1 × Rheinmetall TMX/EO fire control radar and optronic director; 3 × Raytheon Anschutz NSC-25 SeaScout navigational radar; Combat system: Atlas Elektronik COSYS combat management system; Navigation system : Raytheon Anschutz IBS/INS NSC-series; Communication system: Rohde & Schwarz Integrated Communication system
- Armament: 1 × Oto Melara 76/62 Super Rapid; 2 × Denel Land Systems GI-2 20mm autocannon; 2 × U.S. Ordnance M2HB .50 caliber machine gun
- Aviation facilities: helipad

HTMS Pattani (Thai: เรือหลวงปัตตานี) (Note: His Thai Majesty's Ship; see Ship prefix.) is one of two Pattani-class offshore patrol vessels currently commissioned by the Royal Thai Navy.

Under a May 2002 agreement, the China State Shipbuilding Corporation built the Pattani and her sister ship HTMS Naratiwat at the Hudong-Zhonghua Shipyard in Shanghai. Pattani was launched in 2004 and delivered to the Royal Thai Navy on 16 December 2005.

On 10 September 2010, Pattani and the support ship HTMS Similan departed Sattahip Naval Base with a total of "351 sailors and 20 special warfare troops" to join anti-piracy efforts in the Gulf of Aden. "The mission marks the first time Thailand has sent forces overseas to protect its own interest." As part of multi-national Combined Task Force 151, Pattani and especially Similan "disrupted pirate activity" in two separate incidents on 23 October 2010. On 20 January 2011, both ships returned to port after a tour of duty of 137 days.

On 9 March 2014, Pattani was deployed along with AgustaWestland Super Lynx 300 in search and rescue operations of Malaysia Airlines Flight 370.
