= USS Hemminger =

Cannon-class destroyer escort

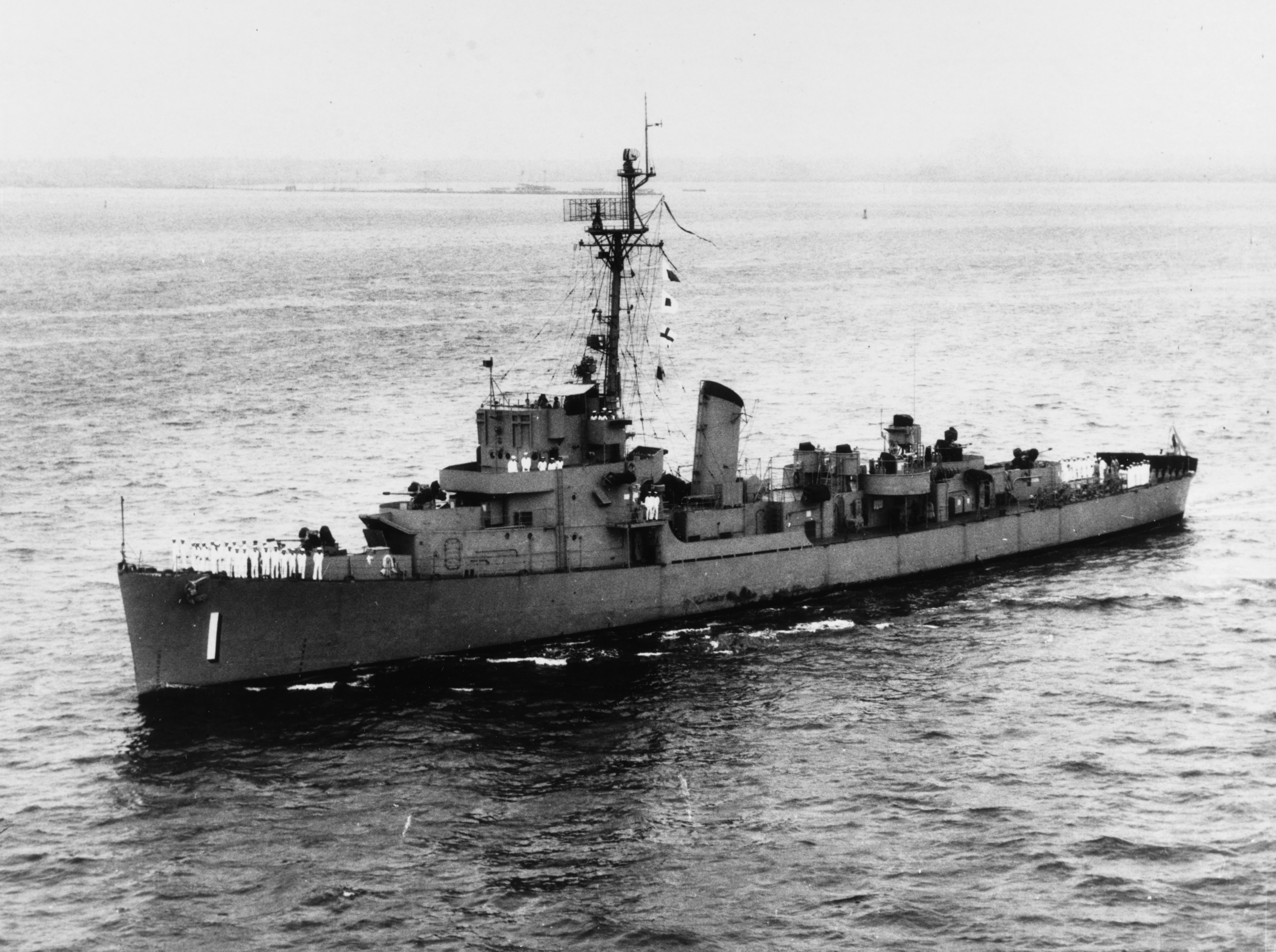
- HTMS Pin Klao off New York City on 6 August 1959

History

United States
- Name: USS Hemminger
- Namesake: Cyril Franklin Hemminger
- Builder: Western Pipe and Steel Company, Los Angeles, California
- Laid down: 8 May 1943
- Launched: 12 September 1943
- Commissioned: 30 May 1944
- Decommissioned: 17 June 1946
- Recommissioned: 1 December 1950
- Decommissioned: 21 February 1958
- Stricken: 3 September 1974
- Fate: Transferred to Thailand, 22 July 1959

Thailand
- Name: HTMS Pin Klao (DE-1) (DE-3) (DE-413)
- Namesake: Second King Pinklao
- Acquired: 22 July 1959
- Commissioned: 31 August 1959
- Decommissioned: 30 September 2025
- Fate: Preserved as a museum ship

General characteristics
- Class & type: Cannon-class destroyer escort
- Displacement: 1,240 long tons (1,260 t) standard; 1,620 long tons (1,646 t) full
- Length: 306 ft (93 m) o/a; 300 ft (91 m) w/l
- Beam: 36 ft 10 in (11.23 m)
- Draft: 11 ft 8 in (3.56 m)
- Propulsion: 4 × GM Mod. 16-278A diesel engines with electric drive, 6,000 shp (4,474 kW), 2 screws
- Speed: 21 knots (39 km/h; 24 mph)
- Range: 10,800 nmi (20,000 km) at 12 kn (22 km/h; 14 mph)
- Complement: 15 officers and 201 enlisted
- Armament: 3 × single Mk.22 3"/50 caliber guns; 3 × twin 40 mm Mk.1 AA gun; 8 × 20 mm Mk.4 AA guns; 3 × 21 inch (533 mm) torpedo tubes; 1 × Hedgehog Mk.10 anti-submarine mortar (144 rounds); 8 × Mk.6 depth charge projectors; 2 × Mk.9 depth charge tracks

USS Hemminger (DE-746) was a Cannon-class destroyer escort in service with the United States Navy from 1944 to 1946 and from 1950 to 1958. In 1959, she was transferred to Thailand, where she served as HTMS Pin Klao (Thai: เรือหลวงปิ่นเกล้า) until she was decommissioned on 10 September 2025, after 66 years of service. She is the last Cannon-class destroyer escort to be decommissioned.

== History ==
=== United States Navy (1944–1958) ===
USS Hemminger was named in honor of Cyril Franklin Hemminger who was killed during the Battle of Savo Island. The ship was launched on 12 September 1943 by the Western Pipe and Steel Company, San Francisco, California; sponsored by Mrs. Sue Frances Hemminger, widow; and commissioned on 30 May 1944.

==== World War II ====
With the ship's shakedown completed, Hemminger reached Pearl Harbor in August 1944 to train submarines for war patrols. She also patrolled between Pearl and Eniwetok and worked in hunter-killer antisubmarine operations. On 28 February 1945 while on a HUK mission with Corregidor (CVE-58) and CortDiv 53, the destroyer escort was diverted to participate in the fruitless search for Lieutenant General Millard F. Harmon, Commander Army Air Forces Pacific, whose plane had disappeared. After patrol duty in the Marshall Islands, Hemminger sailed on 30 April to escort a resupply convoy to Okinawa, where battle still raged. From 16 May to 20 June, she acted as screen for a carrier group engaged in neutralization of Sakishima Gunto and supported ground forces on Okinawa, as well as the air attack on Kyūshū.

Hemminger joined CortDiv 53 and Kassan Bay (CVE-69) for further hunter-killer patrol around Guam and Eniwetok until sailing for the Philippines on 27 September. Detached from the Pacific Fleet, Hemminger reached Norfolk, Virginia, on 2 December via Saipan, Pearl Harbor, San Diego, California, and the Panama Canal. Training out of Green Cove Springs, Florida, occupied Hemminger until she decommissioned there on 17 June 1946 and went into reserve.

==== Cold War ====
After a period of duty with the reserve training program, Hemminger recommissioned at Norfolk, Virginia, on 1 December 1950. In the following years her career assumed a pattern of local operations along the coast punctuated by reserve training cruises to Canada and the Caribbean. One reserve cruise in June 1952 took Hemminger to Lisbon, Portugal, while others saw her at Rouen, France; Barranquilla, Colombia; Cadiz, Spain, and New Orleans, Louisiana.

Hemminger also participated in several fleet exercises and worked with the Gur in August 1954. Departing Little Creek, Virginia, on 23 November 1957 she reported to New York Naval Shipyard for inactivation.

=== Royal Thai Navy (1959–2025) ===
Hemminger decommissioned there on 21 February 1958 and joined the Atlantic Reserve Fleet. She was loaned to Thailand on 22 July 1959 under the Military Assistance Program, and commissioned into the Royal Thai Navy on 31 August 1959 as HTMS Pin Klao (DE-1/DE-3/413). She served as a training ship for naval cadets and naval petty officers, and as a "joint training ship" in combat exercises with international forces. She also operated as a ceremonial ship as part of the guard of honour for the royal barges at Klai Kangwon Palace in Hua Hin, the residence of the late King Bhumibol. On 10 September 2025, Natthaphon Narkphanit, then Deputy Minister of Defense and acting Minister of Defense, signed an order to decommission the WWII-era ship due to deterioration over prolonged service and she is no longer considered viable for further operations.

She has since been moved to the Sattahip Naval Base and moved on land for preservation as a museum ship.

== Awards ==
American Campaign Medal
Asiatic-Pacific Campaign Medal
World War II Victory Medal
National Defense Service Medal
