= Ratanakosin-class corvette =

Thai naval warship class

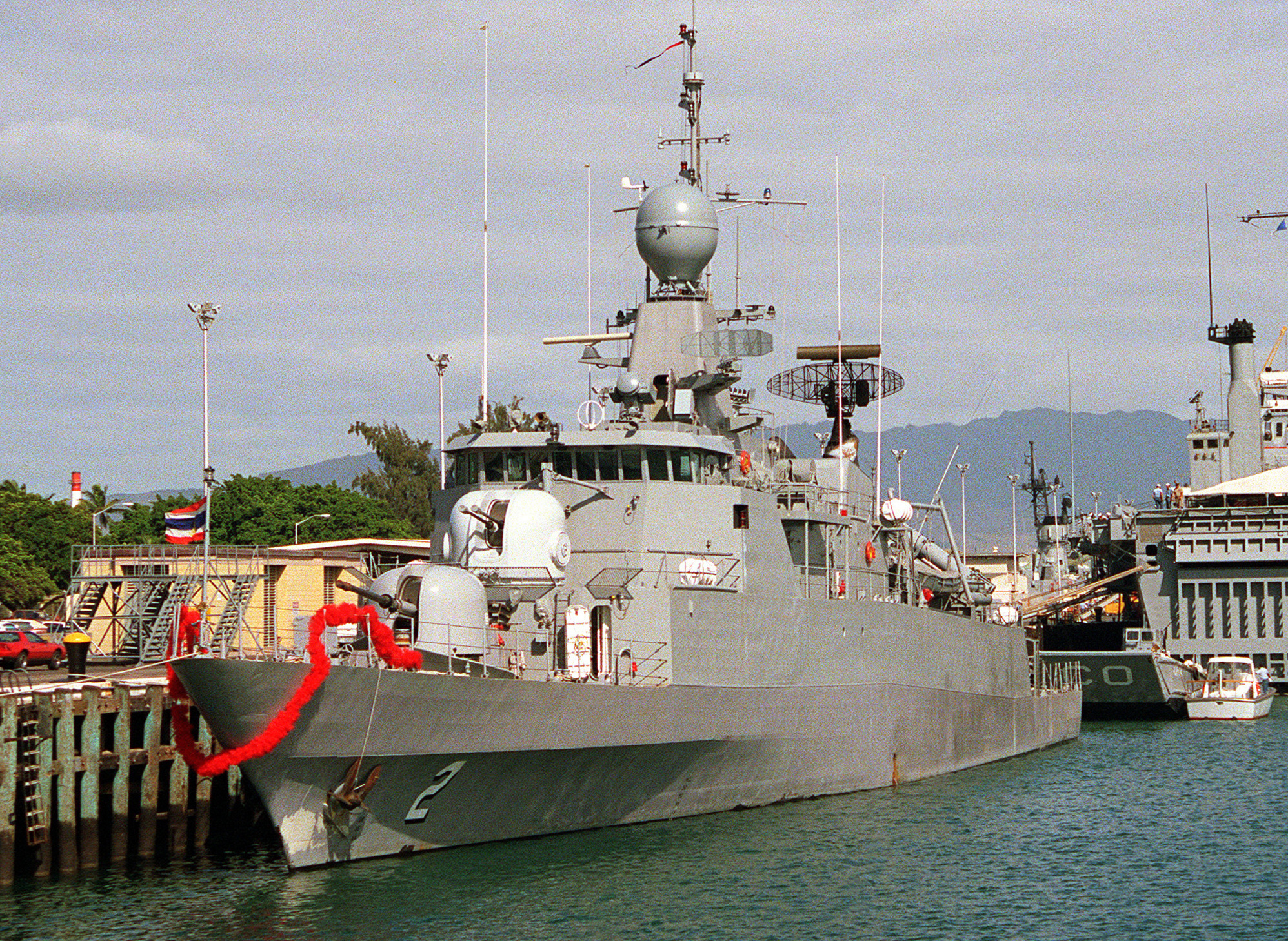
- HTMS Sukhothai, sister ship of HTMS Ratanakosin

Class overview
- Name: Ratanakosin class
- Builders: Tacoma Boatbuilding Company
- Operators: Royal Thai Navy
- Succeeded by: Khamronsin class
- Built: 1984–1986
- In commission: 1986–present
- Planned: 3
- Completed: 2
- Canceled: 1
- Active: 1
- Lost: 1

General characteristics
- Type: Corvette
- Displacement: 840 t (830 long tons) (normal); 960 t (940 long tons) (full load)
- Length: 76.82 m (252 ft 0 in)
- Beam: 9.55 m (31 ft 4 in)
- Draft: 2.44 m (8 ft 0 in)
- Installed power: 12,000 kW (16,000 bhp)
- Propulsion: 2 × MTU 20V1163 TB83 diesel engines, 2 × shafts
- Speed: 26 knots (48 km/h; 30 mph)
- Range: 3,000 nmi (5,600 km; 3,500 mi) at 16 kn (30 km/h; 18 mph)
- Complement: 15 officers, 72 enlisted
- Sensors & processing systems: 1 × Decca 1226 surface-search radar; 1 × HSA ZW-06 surface-search radar; 1 × HSA DA-05 air/surface-search radar; 1 × HSA WM-25 fire-control radar; 1 × HSA LIROD-8 optical fire-control system; STN Atlas DSQS-21C hull-mounted sonar
- Armament: Missiles; 2 × quad RGM-84 Harpoon anti-ship missile launchers (8 Harpoons); 1 × octuple Albatros SAM launcher (24 Selenia Aspide SAMs); Guns; 1 × Otobreda 76 mm (3 in) gun; 1 × DARDO CIWS; 2 × 20 mm Oerlikon GAM-B01 cannon; Torpedoes; 2 × Mark 32 triple torpedo tubes (Sting Ray torpedoes)

The Ratanakosin-class corvettes (Thai: รัตนโกสินทร์) are a class of two corvettes that were built for the Royal Thai Navy in the 1980s. Constructed by Tacoma Boatbuilding Company in the United States, a third was planned to be built in Thailand but was canceled before construction could begin. The Ratanakosin class is used as flagships for squadrons of fast attack craft.

One of the two, Sukhothai, sank in a storm on 18 December 2022.

== Design ==
The Ratanakosin class is based on the Saudi Arabian Badr-class design. They have a normal displacement of 840 metric tons (830 long tons) and 960 t (940 long tons) full load. The corvettes measure 76.82 metres (252 ft 0 in) long with a beam of 9.55 m (31 ft 4 in) and a draft of 2.44 m (8 ft 0 in). The class is powered by MTU 20V1163 TB83 diesel engines, each driving one shaft rated at 12,000 kilowatts (16,000 bhp). This gives the vessels a maximum speed of 26 knots (48 km/h; 30 mph) and a range of 3,000 nautical miles (5,600 km; 3,500 mi) at 16 knots (30 km/h; 18 mph). The ships have a complement of 15 officers and 72 enlisted.

The class is equipped with one Decca 1226 and one HSA ZW-06 surface-search radar, one HSA DA-05 air/surface-search radar, one HSA WM-25 fire-control radar, one HSA LIROD-8 optical fire-control system, and one STN Atlas DSQS-21C hull-mounted sonar. The corvettes are armed with two quad launchers for eight RGM-84 Harpoon anti-ship missiles and one octuple Albatros launcher for 24 Selenia Aspide surface-to-air missiles (SAM). Furthermore, the vessels are armed with one Otobreda 76 mm (3 in) gun, one DARDO CIWS, and two 20 mm (0.8 in) Oerlikon GAM-B01 cannons. The Ratanakosin class is also equipped with two Mark 32 triple torpedo tubes for Sting Ray torpedoes.

== Ships in the class ==
Name	Number	Builder	Laid down	Launched	Commissioned	Status
HTMS Ratanakosin เรือหลวงรัตนโกสินทร์	FS-441	Tacoma Boatbuilding Company	6 February 1984	11 March 1986	26 September 1986	In active service
HTMS Sukhothai เรือหลวงสุโขทัย	FS-442	Tacoma Boatbuilding Company	26 March 1984	20 July 1986	19 February 1987	Sank on 18 December 2022

== Construction and career ==
The Royal Thai Navy ordered two corvettes from Tacoma Boatbuilding Company in Tacoma, Washington, United States on 9 May 1983. The lead ship was laid down on 6 February 1984. Named Ratanakosin, the vessel was launched on 11 March 1986. The second ship in the class was laid down on 26 March 1984. Named Sukhothai, the vessel was launched on 20 July 1986. Ratanakosin was commissioned on 26 September 1986 and Sukhothai on 19 February 1987. The third ship, which was planned for construction in Thailand, was canceled before construction began. This was due to increased interest by the Royal Thai Navy in Vosper Thornycroft's design that became the Khamronsin class. Ratanakosin-class corvettes are used as flagships for squadrons of fast attack craft.

Sukhothai sank in a storm on 18 December 2022.

== See also ==
- Rattanakosindra-class gunboat, identically named class from the 1920s
