= HTMS Makut Rajakumarn =

Frigate of the Royal Thai Navy

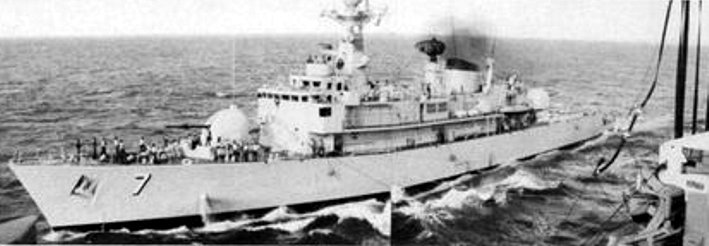
- Makut Rajakumarn in 1983

History

Thailand
- Name: HTMS Makut Rajakumarn
- Namesake: Crown Prince Vajiralongkorn
- Builder: Yarrow Shipbuilders, Glasgow
- Launched: 18 November 1971
- Commissioned: 7 May 1973
- Status: in service as a training ship
- Badge

General characteristics
- Type: Frigate
- Displacement: 1,650 tons standard, 1,900 tons full load
- Length: 97.6 m (320 ft 3 in)
- Beam: 10.97 m (36 ft 0 in)
- Draught: 5.5 m (18 ft 1 in)
- Propulsion: 2 shaft CODOG; 1 Rolls-Royce Olympus gas turbine 19,500 hp (14,500 kW); 1 Crossley Pelstick PA6S diesel 6,000 hp (4,500 kW)
- Speed: 26 knots (48 km/h; 30 mph); 18 knots (33 km/h; 21 mph) diesels only
- Range: 5,000 nmi (9,300 km; 5,800 mi) at 16 knots (30 km/h; 18 mph)
- Crew: 140
- Sensors & processing systems: Radar - HSA LW-04, HSA WM-22, Decca 626; Sonar 170B, 162, Plessey M27
- Armament: Anti-aircraft missile (1x4) Sea Cat (later removed); 2 4.5 inch Mark 8 naval gun; 2 × 40 mm Bofors AA guns (2x1); 1 Limbo anti submarine mortar (later removed); 2 × 3 anti-submarine torpedo tubes (added in 1988 replacing Limbo)

HTMS Makut Rajakumarn (Thai: เรือหลวงมกุฎราชกุมาร) is a frigate operated by the Royal Thai Navy. The ship was built by Yarrow Shipbuilders in Glasgow, Scotland 1971. The ship entered service in 1973 and is currently (2010) in service as a training ship.

The design was based on the Malaysian frigate KD Rahmat, but is larger and has a second gun at the stern. The ship was refitted in 1985–1988 following an engine room fire in 1984, with the Sea Cat missiles and Limbo anti submarine mortar removed and replaced by anti-submarine torpedo tubes and new radar and sonar.
