= Khamronsin-class corvette =

1992 class of corvettes of the Royal Thai Navy

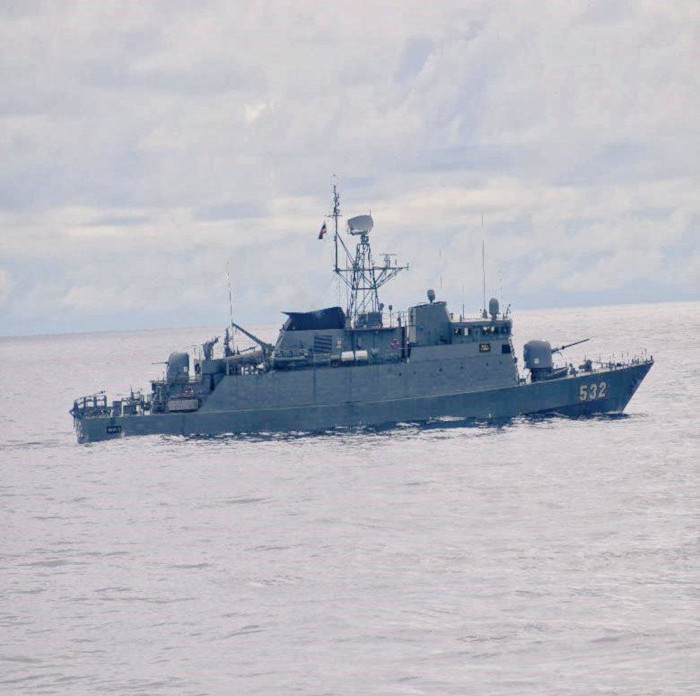
- HTMS Thayanchon

Class overview
- Name: Khamronsin class
- Builders: Italthai Marine Ltd, Thailand
- Operators: Royal Thai Navy; Thai Police
- Preceded by: Ratanakosin class
- Subclasses: Srinakarin
- Built: 1988–1989
- In commission: 1992–present
- Completed: 4
- Active: 4 (3 in navy & 1 in police)

General characteristics
- Type: Corvette
- Displacement: 630 t (620 long tons) (full load)
- Length: 62 m (203 ft 5 in) oa; 56.4 m (185 ft 0 in) wl
- Beam: 8.2 m (26 ft 11 in)
- Draught: 2.5 m (8 ft 2 in)
- Propulsion: 2 × MTU 12V 1163 TB93 diesel engines; 5,600 kW (7,500 bhp); 2 shafts
- Speed: 25 knots (46 km/h; 29 mph)
- Range: 2,500 nmi (4,600 km; 2,900 mi) at 15 knots (28 km/h; 17 mph)
- Complement: 6 officers, 51 enlisted
- Sensors & processing systems: Nautis P combat data system; Sea Archer 1A Mod 2 optronic GCFS; ASW 4 air/surface search radar; DSQS-21C hull-mounted sonar
- Armament: 1 × OTO Melara 76 mm (3 in)/62 Mod 7 gun; 1 × twin Breda 30 mm (1.2 in)/70 guns; 2 × triple PMW49A torpedo tubes for Sting Ray torpedoes; Mk.6 depth charge launcher

The Khamronsin-class corvettes are three corvettes constructed for the Royal Thai Navy in the late 1980s. Based on a British design, all three ships were built in Thailand. A fourth vessel, constructed to a modified design, was built for the Thai Police and was the first to enter service in 1992. The three Khamrosin-class corvettes commissioned in 1992 and remain in service.

== Design and description ==
The three Khamronsin-class corvettes are based on the British Vosper Thornycroft Province design that was the basis for the Omani Dhofar class with increased spacing between the frames, increasing the length of the vessels. The vessels have a full load displacement of 630 tonnes (620 long tons). (Note: Gardiner, Chumbley & Budzbon have the displacement as 342 t (337 long tons) normal and 483 t (475 long tons) at full load.) The corvettes measure 62 metres (203 ft 5 in) long overall and 56.4 m (185 ft 0 in) at the waterline with a beam of 8.2 m (26 ft 11 in) and a draught of 2.5 m (8 ft 2 in). The Khamronsin class is propelled by two Kamewha controllable pitch propellers, each on their own shaft, powered by two MTU 12V 1163 TB93 diesel engines rated at 5,600 kilowatts (7,500 bhp). The vessels have a maximum speed of 25 knots (46 km/h; 29 mph) and a range of 2,500 nautical miles (4,600 km; 2,900 mi) at 15 knots (28 km/h; 17 mph). The corvettes have a complement of 6 officers and 51 enlisted.

The class is equipped with Plessey Nautis P combat data system and the British Aerospace Sea Archer 1A Mod 2 optronic gun control fire system (GCFS). They mount the Plessey AWS 4 air/surface search radar and the Atlas Elektronik DSQS-21C hull-mounted sonar. The Khamronsin class is armed with one OTO Melara 76 mm (3 in)/62 Mod 7 gun mounted forward and twin-mounted Breda 30 mm (1.2 in)/70 guns atop the aft superstructure. The corvettes also mount two triple Plessey PMW49A torpedo tubes for Sting Ray torpedoes and two 12.7 mm (0.50 in) machine guns. A Mk.6 depth charge launcher and naval mines can also be installed aboard the ships.

=== Srinakarin sub class ===
A fourth unit was designed and constructed for the police. This vessel, Srinakarin, shares the same displacement and measurements as the Khamronsin class. However, the vessel is powered by two Deutz MWM BV16M628 diesel engines turning two shafts with Kamewha controllable pitch propellers rated at 7,102 kW (9,524 hp). The ship has the same speed and range as the Khamronsin class, but has a smaller complement with only 45 crew members. Srinakarin is armed with two twin-mounted 30 mm guns and has Racal Decca 1226 surface search radar.

== Units ==
Name	Number	Builder	Laid down	Launched	Commissioned	Decommissioned	Status
Kamronsin class
HTMS Kamronsin	FS 531	Ital Thai Marine, Bangkok, Thailand	15 March 1988	15 August 1989	29 July 1992		In active service
HTMS Thayanchon	FS 532	Ital Thai Marine, Bangkok, Thailand	20 April 1988	7 December 1989	5 September 1992		In active service
HTMS Longlom	FS 533	Bangkok Naval Dockyard, Bangkok, Thailand	15 March 1988	8 August 1989	2 October 1992		In active service
Srinakarin sub-class
Srinakarin	1084	Ital Thai Marine, Bangkok, Thailand			April 1992		In active service

== Construction and career ==
The first two Royal Thai Navy corvettes were ordered on 29 September 1987 from Ital Thai Marine at their yard in Bangkok, Thailand with aid to construct a third at the Bangkok Naval Dockyard. The first two vessels were laid down on 15 March 1988, one in each yard. The third ship was laid down at Ital Thai Marine's yard on 20 April. Longlom was launched on 8 August 1989 and Kamronsin on 15 August. Srinakarin, the fourth vessel, was ordered by the police in September 1989 from the Ital Thai Marine yard. The vessel's yard number was 82. Srinakarin was the first to enter service in April 1992. Kamronsin was the first naval version to commission on 29 July 1992, followed by Thayanchon on 5 September and Longlom on 2 October. All four ships are in service.
