= HTMS Similan =

Replenishment oiler of the Royal Thai Navy

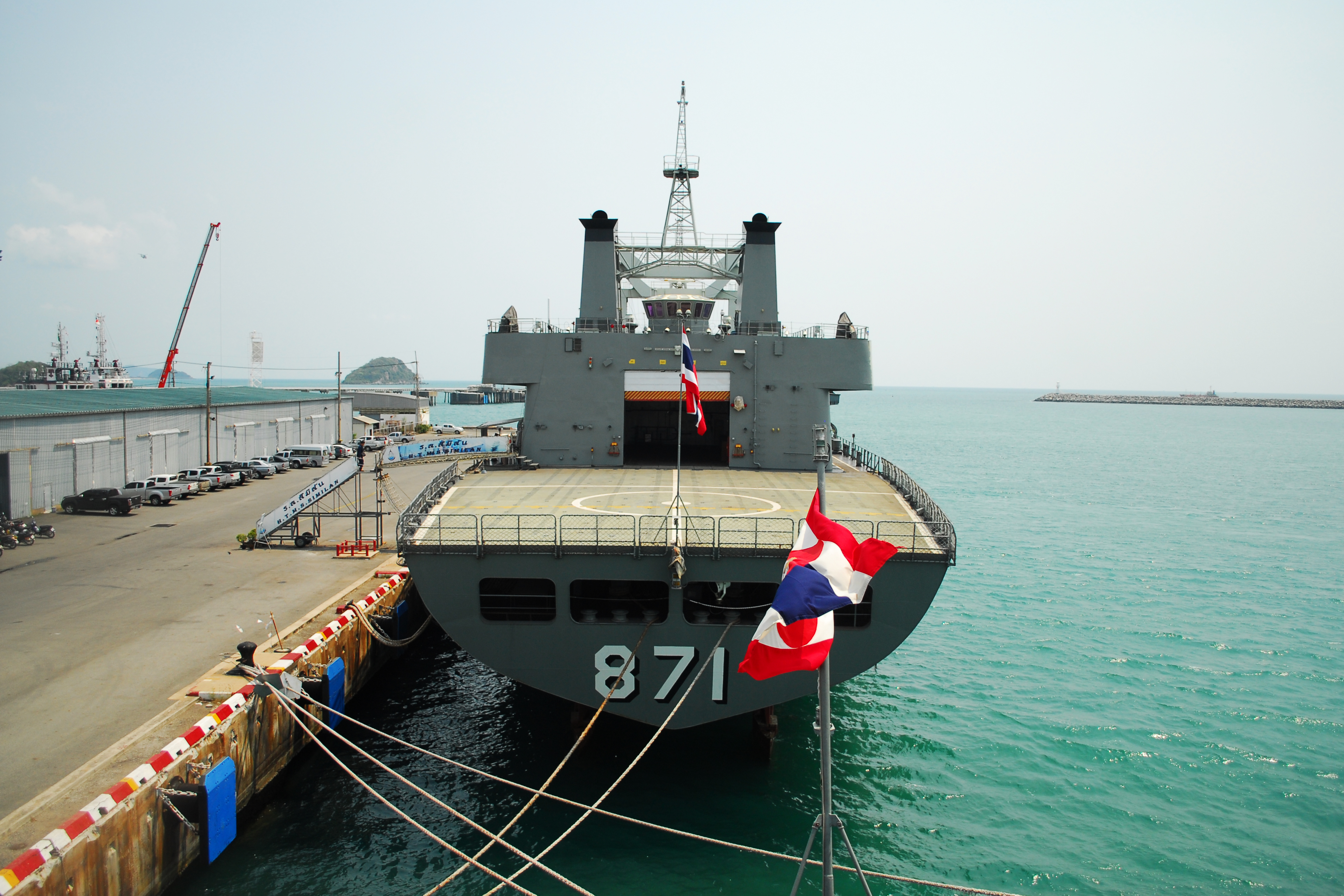
- Stern of Similan in port at the Sattahip Naval Base

History

Thailand
- Name: Similan
- Namesake: Similan Islands
- Awarded: 29 September 1993
- Builder: Hudong Shipyard
- Laid down: December 1994
- Launched: 9 November 1995
- Commissioned: 12 September 1996
- Decommissioned: 1 October 2026
- Identification: Hull number: 871
- Status: Decommissioned

General characteristics
- Class & type: Replenishment oiler
- Displacement: 23,369 tons (full load)
- Length: 171.4 metres (562 ft)
- Beam: 24.6 metres (81 ft)
- Draught: 9 metres (30 ft)
- Propulsion: 2 x HD-SEMT-Pielstick 16 PC2 6V400 diesel engines; 2 shafts, each driving a Kamewa controllable-pitch propeller; Total output: 24,000 hp (18,000 kW)
- Speed: 19 knots (35 km/h; 22 mph)
- Range: 10,000 nautical miles (19,000 km; 12,000 mi) at 15 knots (28 km/h; 17 mph)
- Capacity: 9000 tons of fuel oil, water, and stores
- Complement: 157
- Sensors & processing systems: Type 354 air/surface search radar; Racal-Decca 1290 ARPA navigation radar
- Aircraft carried: 1 x Sikorsky S-70
- Aviation facilities: Hangar and flight deck

HTMS Similan (871) (Thai: เรือหลวงสิมิลัน) is a replenishment oiler (AOR) of the Royal Thai Navy. She was intended to support the aircraft carrier HTMS Chakri Naruebet and its escorts. Similan was constructed in the People's Republic of China at the Hudong Shipyard through a 1993 contract with the China State Shipbuilding Corporation. The ship was commissioned in 1996. Similan is the largest ship in the Thai navy and the largest naval ship exported by China. (Note: Some reports expected the record to be broken by HTMS Chang (LPD-792), though the latter's displacement was later reported as 20,003 tonnes, less than Similan's.)

The design is a flush-decked development of the Chinese Type 905 AOR resembling the French Durance; the builder referred to the design as Type R22T. Similan was a sister ship or the precursor to the later Chinese Type 903.

== Design ==
Similan has two refueling stations on each side. Solid cargo is transferred by helicopter.

The ship was planned to be armed with Chinese weapons; four Type 76 twin 37 mm naval guns and the Type 341 radar were not fitted.

== Career ==
Similan deployed together with HTMS Pattani in 2010 and HTMS Narathiwat in 2011 to combat piracy off the coast of Somalia as part of Combined Task Force 151.

== Sources ==
- Saunders, Stephan, ed. (2015). Jane's Fighting Ships 2015-2016. Jane's Information Group. ISBN 978-0710631435.
- Wertheim, Eric (2013). The Naval Institute Guide to Combat Fleets of the World: Their Ships, Aircraft, and Systems (16 ed.). Annapolis, Maryland: Naval Institute Press. ISBN 978-1591149545.
