= Tapi-class corvette =

1971 class of corvettes of the Royal Thai Navy

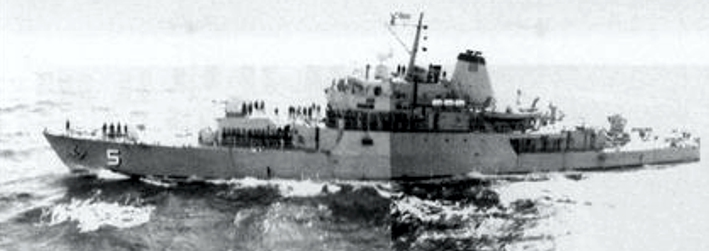
- HTMS Tapi (5) in 1983

Class overview
- Name: Tapi class
- Builders: American Shipbuilding Co / Norfolk Shipbuilding & Drydock Co, both USA
- Operators: Royal Thai Navy
- Built: 1970–1974
- In commission: 1971–present
- Completed: 2
- Active: 1
- Retired: 1

General characteristics Following 1980s refit and rearmament
- Type: Corvette
- Displacement: 885 long tons (899 t) standard; 1,172 long tons (1,191 t) full load
- Length: 275 ft (83.8 m)
- Beam: 33 ft (10.1 m)
- Draft: 14 ft 1 in (4.3 m) (sonar dome)
- Propulsion: 2× Fairbanks-Morse 38TD8-1/8-9 diesel engines, 2 shafts; 5,250 hp (3,910 kW)
- Speed: 20 kn (23 mph; 37 km/h)
- Range: 2,400 nmi (2,800 mi; 4,400 km) at 18 knots (21 mph; 33 km/h)
- Complement: 15 officers, 120 enlisted
- Sensors & processing systems: Radar: Signaal LW04 Air/surface search; Raytheon SPS-53E surface search; Signaal WM-22-61 fire control; Sonar: Atlas Elektronik DSQS-21C hull-mounted, medium frequency active search/attack
- Armament: 1 × OTO Melara 76 mm/62 compact gun; 1× Bofors 40mm/70 gun; 2× Oerlikon 20 mm; 2× 12.7 mm machine guns; 2× triple Mark 32 Anti-submarine warfare torpedo tubes, Mark 46 torpedoes; Depth charges

Tapi-class corvettes are a class of two corvettes that were built for the Royal Thai Navy in the early 1970s.

== Design and construction ==
In 1969, Thailand ordered from the United States a single small PF 103-class frigate, of which four examples, the Bayandor class, had been built for Iran in the 1960s, with a second example being ordered in 1971. For procurement purposes, they were allocated the US Navy hull numbers PF 107 and PF 108.

As built, single 3 inch/50 calibre Mk 34 automatic anti-aircraft guns were mounted fore and aft, each capable of firing 6.8 kg (15 lb) shells to a range of 13,400 m (14,600 yd) at a rate of 45 rounds per minute, backed up by a twin Bofors 40mm/L60 mount. Two triple Mark 32 torpedo tubes for anti-submarine torpedoes and a Hedgehog anti-submarine mortar comprised the ships' anti-submarine armament. AN/SPS-6 air-search radar and SQS-17 sonar comprised the ships' sensor suite.

== Operational history ==
The first ship, Tapi, was commissioned on 19 November 1971, with the second ship, Khirirat, following on 10 August 1974. Both ships were modernised during the 1980s, with the US 3-inch guns being replaced by a rapid fire OTO Melara 76 mm gun forward, and a Bofors 40mm/70 gun aft, with two single 20 mm cannon replaced the existing twin Bofors mount. The obsolete Hedgehog was removed, and the ships were fitted with new radar and sonar systems.

As of 2002, they were used for patrolling Thailand's Exclusive economic zone.

== Units ==
Pennant number	Name	Builder	Laid Down	Launched	Commissioned
5 (later 431)	Tapi	American SB Co, Toledo, Ohio	1 April 1970	17 October 1970	1 November 1971
6 (later 432)	Khirirat	Norfolk SB	18 February 1972	2 June 1973	10 August 1974
