= HTMS Saiburi =

Frigate-class ship in the Royal Thai Navy

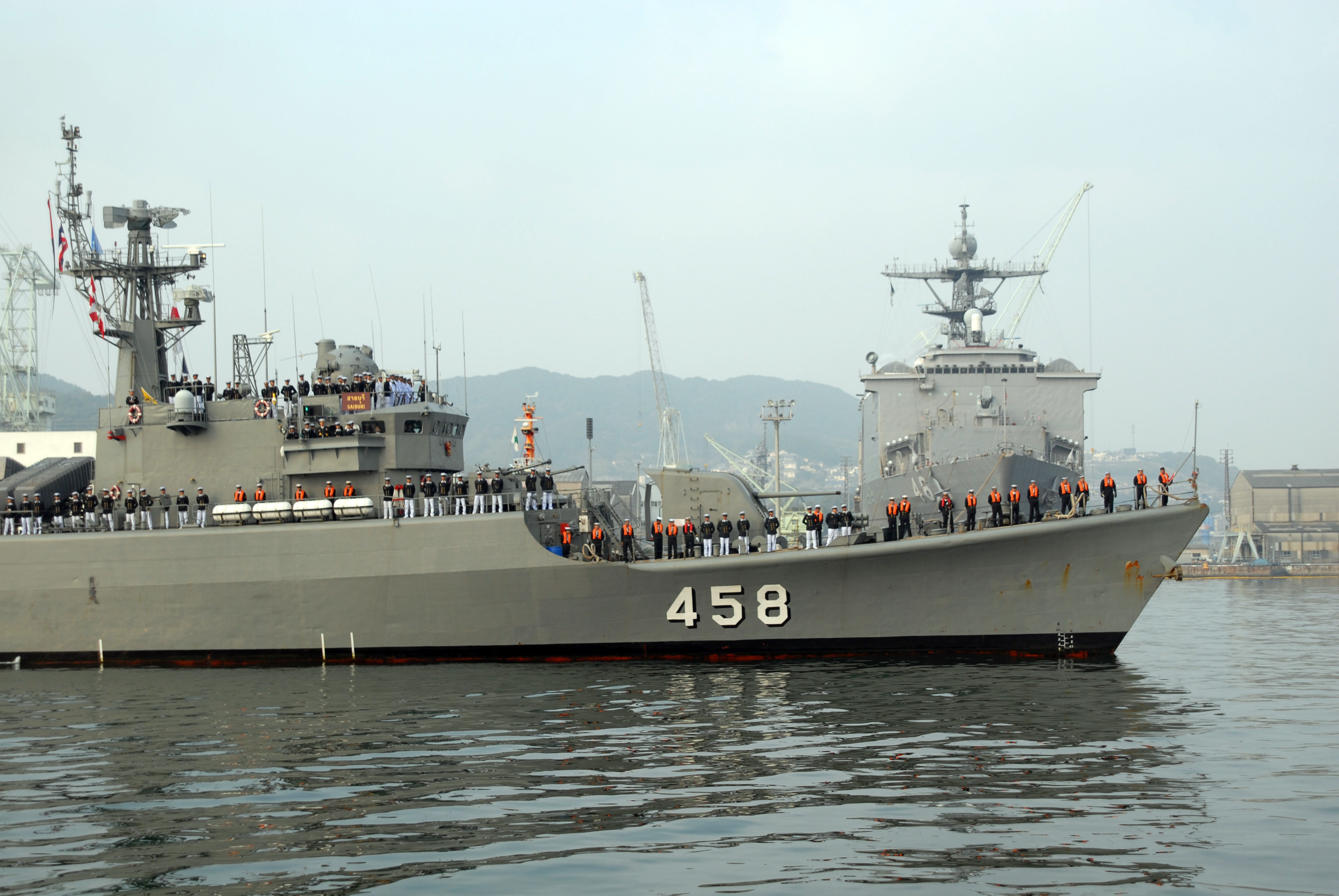
- HTMS Saiburi in Sasebo Harbor, 2008

History

Thailand
- Name: HTMS Saiburi
- Namesake: Sai Buri River
- Ordered: 18 July 1988
- Builder: Hudong Shipyard, Shanghai
- Laid down: 1990
- Launched: 27 August 1991
- Commissioned: 4 August 1992
- Status: In service

General characteristics
- Class & type: Chao Phraya-class frigate
- Displacement: 1,676 long tons (1,703 t) standard; 1,924 long tons (1,955 t) full
- Length: 103.2 m (338 ft 7 in)
- Beam: 11.3 m (37 ft 1 in)
- Draught: 3.1 m (10 ft 2 in)
- Propulsion: 4 × MTU 20V1163 TB83 diesel engines, driving two shafts with controllable pitch propellers
- Speed: 30 knots (56 km/h) max
- Range: 3,500 nautical miles (6,500 km) at 18 knots (33 km/h)
- Complement: 168
- Sensors & processing systems: SR-60 air/surface radar; TR47C fire control radar; Racal-Decca 1290 A/D ARPA Navigation radar; Anritsu RA 71CA Navigation radar; Type 651 IFF; Poseidon III combat management system; Type SJD-5A sonar
- Electronic warfare & decoys: ESM ES-3601-10; Decoys 2 × Type 945 GPJ chaff launchers
- Armament: 1 × 100 mm/56 Type 79A twin-barreled gun; 4 × 37 mm Type 76A twin-barreled guns; 8 × C-802A SSM launchers; 2 × Type 86 anti-submarine rocket launchers; 2 × BMB depth charge racks
- Aircraft carried: 1 × Bell 212 helicopter
- Aviation facilities: Flight deck

HTMS Saiburi (FFG-458) (Thai: เรือหลวงสายบุรี) is the fourth ship of Chao Phraya-class frigate of the Royal Thai Navy, a variant of the Chinese-built Type 053H2 frigate.

== Design and description ==
Saiburi has a length of 103.2 m (339 ft), a beam of 11.3 m (37 ft), a draught of 3.1 m (10 ft) and displacement of 1,676 long tons (1,703 t) standard and 1,924 long tons (1,955 t) at full load. The ship has two shafts and powered with four MTU 20V1163 TB83 diesel engines with 29,440 shp (21,950 kW). The ship has a range of 3,500 nautical miles (6,500 km) while cruising at 18 knots (33 km/h) and top speed of 30 knots (56 km/h). Saiburi has a complement of 168 personnel, including 22 officers.

As a Type 053HT (H) frigate, the ship were armed with one 100 mm/56 Type 79 twin-barreled gun and four 37 mm Type 76 twin-barreled guns. For anti-submarine warfare, the ship is equipped with two Type 86 anti-submarine rocket launchers and two BMB depth charge racks. For surface warfare, Saiburi was equipped with eight C-801 anti-ship missile launchers. She also has a flight deck and able to carry a helicopter, although the ship didn't have a hangar.

Saiburi underwent modernization program in 2009. The upgrade includes replacement of old weapons and electronic systems with newer systems, such as new 100 mm/56 Type 79A twin-barreled gun and 37 mm Type 76A twin-barreled remote-controlled guns along with their respective fire control radars and the installation of new C-802A anti-ship missiles.

== Construction and career ==
The four ships of the class was ordered on 18 July 1988. Saiburi was laid down somewhere in 1990 at Hudong Shipyard, Shanghai. The ship was launched on 27 August 1991 and was commissioned on 4 August 1992. Upon the ship completion and arrival on Thailand, the shipbuilding quality were deemed to be unsatisfactory and works was needed to improve the ship. The damage control abilities were also upgraded before she entered service.

Upon entering service, Saiburi and her sisters were frequently used for training and rotated monthly to the Coast Guard.

The ship took part in a humanitarian assistance operation in May 2015 by providing food, water, fuel and medical help to the Rohingya and Bengali migrants found adrift on boats in the Andaman Sea to keep them able continuing the journey and prevent them from landing on Thai shores.

On 21–30 March 2022, Saiburi and Naresuan along with a Thai navy S-76B helicopter took part in Exercise Singsiam 2022 with the Republic of Singapore Navy. The sea phase of the exercise were held in the Malacca Strait and Andaman Sea.
