= HTMS Kraburi =

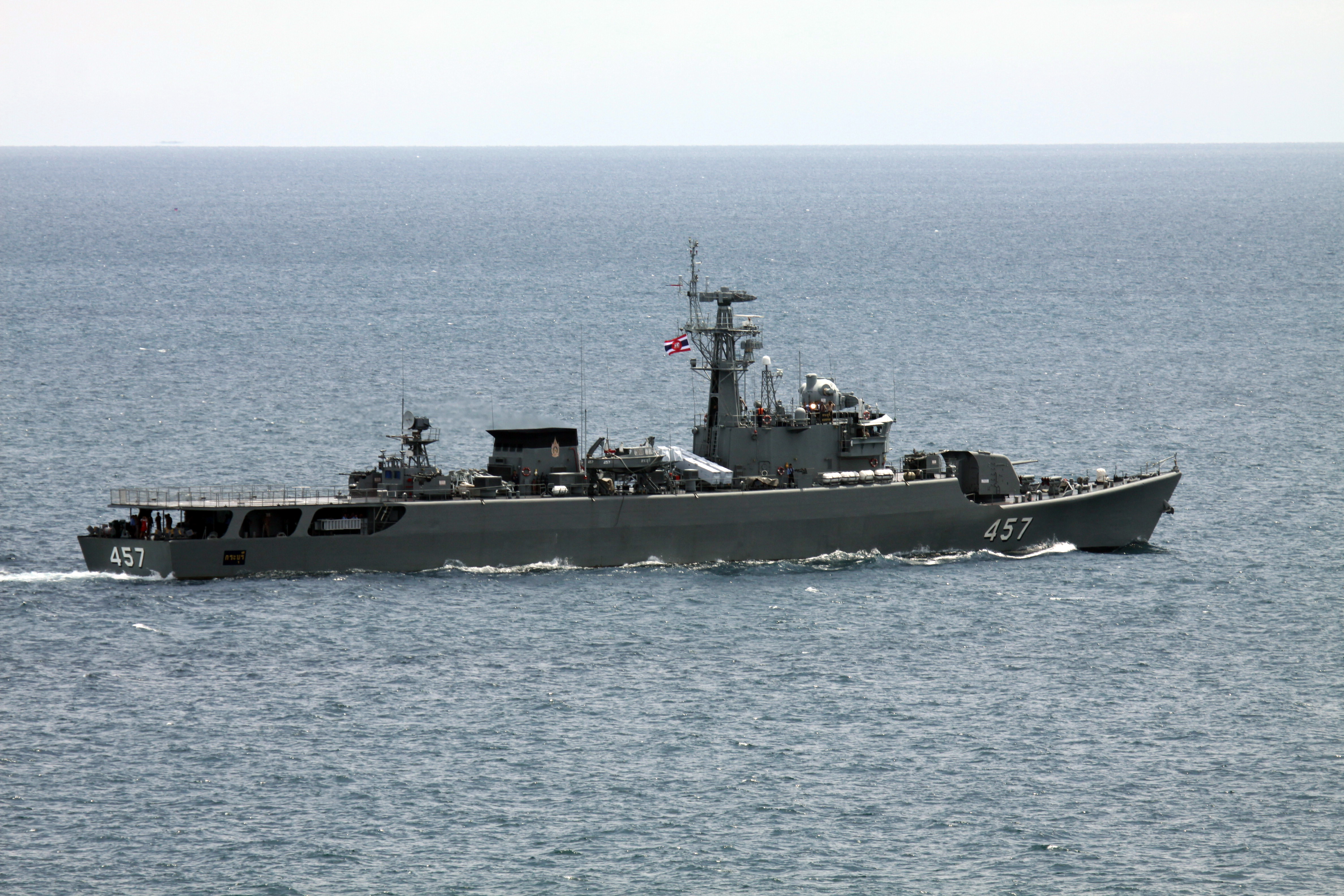
- HTMS Kraburi in 2010

History

Thailand
- Name: HTMS Kraburi
- Namesake: Kraburi River
- Ordered: 18 July 1988
- Builder: Hudong Shipyard, Shanghai
- Laid down: 1990
- Launched: 28 December 1990
- Commissioned: 16 January 1992
- Status: In service

General characteristics
- Class & type: Chao Phraya-class frigate
- Displacement: 1,676 long tons (1,703 t) standard; 1,924 long tons (1,955 t) full
- Length: 103.2 m (338 ft 7 in)
- Beam: 11.3 m (37 ft 1 in)
- Draught: 3.1 m (10 ft 2 in)
- Propulsion: 4 × MTU 20V1163 TB83 diesel engines, driving two shafts with controllable pitch propellers
- Speed: 30 knots (56 km/h) max
- Range: 3,500 nautical miles (6,500 km) at 18 knots (33 km/h)
- Complement: 168
- Sensors & processing systems: SR-60 air/surface radar; TR47C fire control radar; Racal-Decca 1290 A/D ARPA Navigation radar; Anritsu RA 71CA Navigation radar; Type 651 IFF; Poseidon III combat management system; Type SJD-5A sonar
- Electronic warfare & decoys: ESM ES-3601-10; Decoys 2 × Type 945 GPJ chaff launchers
- Armament: 1 × 100 mm/56 Type 79A twin-barreled gun; 4 × 37 mm Type 76A twin-barreled guns; 8 × C-802A SSM launchers; 2 × Type 86 anti-submarine rocket launchers; 2 × BMB depth charge racks
- Aircraft carried: 1 × Bell 212 helicopter
- Aviation facilities: Flight deck

HTMS Kraburi (FFG-457) (Thai: เรือหลวงกระบุรี) is the third ship of Chao Phraya-class frigate of the Royal Thai Navy, a variant of the Chinese-built Type 053H2 frigate.

== Design and description ==
Kraburi has a length of 103.2 m (339 ft), a beam of 11.3 m (37 ft), a draught of 3.1 m (10 ft) and displacement of 1,676 long tons (1,703 t) standard and 1,924 long tons (1,955 t) at full load. The ship has two shafts and is powered by four MTU 20V1163 TB83 diesel engines with 29,440 shp (21,950 kW). The ship has a range of 3,500 nautical miles (6,500 km) while cruising at 18 knots (33 km/h) and a top speed of 30 knots (56 km/h). Kraburi has a complement of 168 personnel, including 22 officers.

As a Type 053HT (H) frigate, the ship was armed at launch with one 100 mm/56 Type 79 twin-barreled gun and four 37 mm Type 76 twin-barreled guns. For anti-submarine warfare, the ship was equipped with two Type 86 anti-submarine rocket launchers and two BMB depth charge racks. For surface warfare, Kraburi was equipped with eight C-801 anti-ship missile launchers. Kraburi also has a flight deck and is able to carry a medium-sized helicopter, although the ship lacks a hangar.

Kraburi underwent a modernization program in 2009. The upgrade included replacement of older weapons and electronic systems with newer systems, such as a new 100 mm/56 Type 79A twin-barreled gun and 37 mm Type 76A twin-barreled remote-controlled guns along with their respective fire control radars and the installation of new C-802A anti-ship missiles.

== Construction and career ==
The four ships of the class was ordered on the 18th of July 1988. Kraburi was laid down around 1990 at Hudong Shipyard, Shanghai. The ship was launched on the 28th of December 1990 and commissioned on 16 January 1992. Upon the ship’s completion and arrival to Thailand, the shipbuilding quality was deemed unsatisfactory and the ship underwent improvements. Kraburi’s damage control abilities were also upgraded before she entered service.

Upon entering service, Kraburi and her sisters were frequently used for training and were rotated monthly to the Coast Guard.

In April 1997, Kraburi and frigate HTMS Naresuan were sent to Spanish waters to escort HTMS Chakri Naruebet during the aircraft carrier's aviation trials in Rota, Spain. The two frigates also escorted the aircraft carrier back to Thailand, arriving on the 10th of August 1997.

The ship was damaged and washed ashore in the aftermath of the 2004 Indian Ocean earthquake and tsunami that occurred on the 26th of December 2004. She was repaired and re-entered service by February 2005.

Kraburi and INS Karmuk attended the 30th India-Thailand Coordinated Patrol (Indo-Thai CORPAT) on 18–20th November 2022.

On the 18th of December 2022, corvette HTMS Sukhothai was flooded and listing after being caught in a storm off Bang Saphan, Prachuap Khiri Khan province. Of the several ships and helicopters sent to assist the ship, only Kraburi managed to arrive on scene and rescue the personnel before Sukhothai sunk at midnight. Kraburi along with several other ships continued to search the area for still-missing personnel several days after the incident.

Kraburi along with her sister ship HTMS Chao Phraya recently visited Okinawa’s White Beach Naval Facility as part of a multinational training engagement in March 2025.

The ship’s current home port is Sattahip Naval Base.
