= Chao Phraya-class frigate =

Thai class of ship

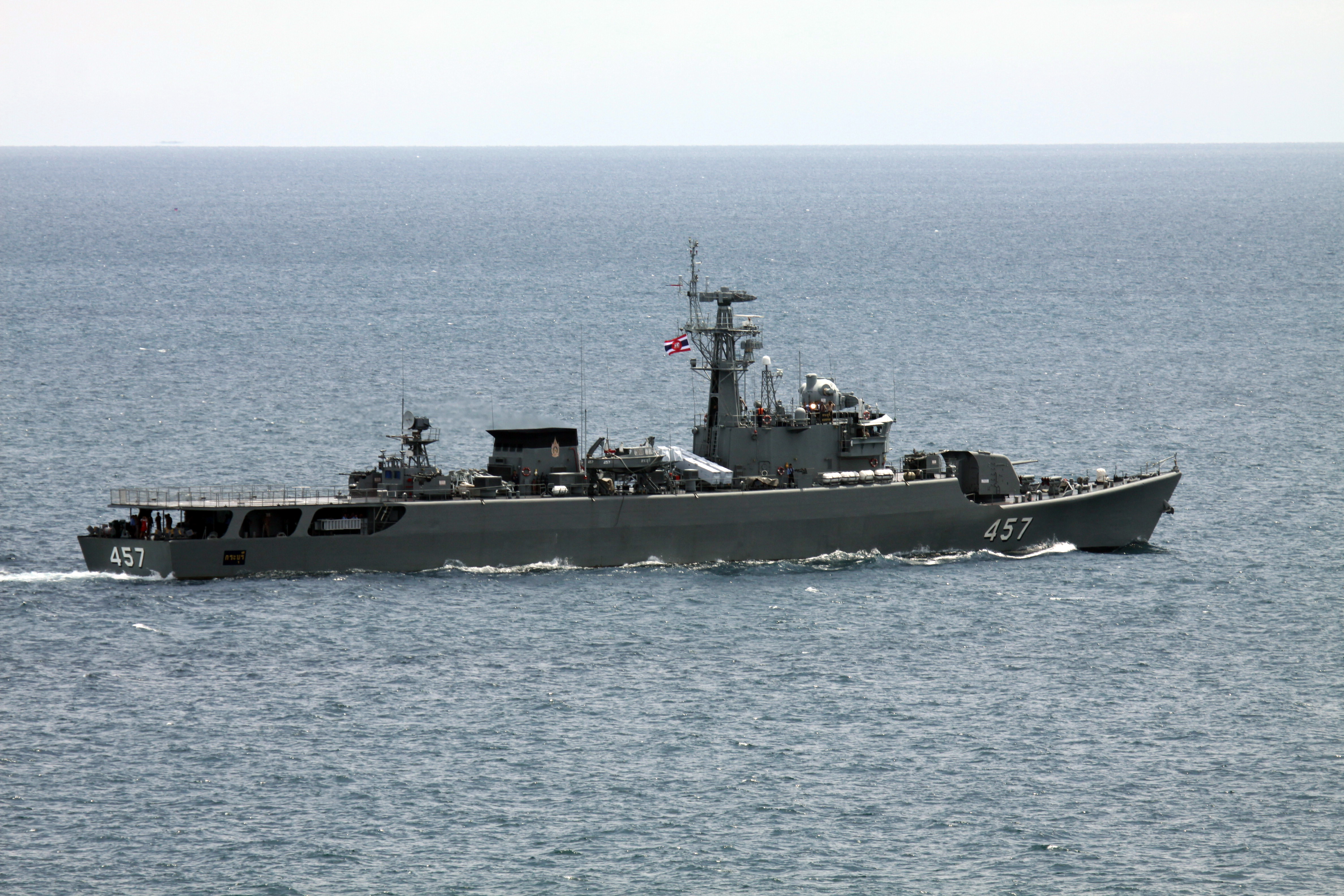
- HTMS Kraburi underway in 2010

Class overview
- Name: Chao Phraya class; (Type 053HT / Type 053HT (H))
- Builders: Hudong Shipyard, Shanghai
- Operators: Royal Thai Navy
- Preceded by: Makut Rajakumarn
- Succeeded by: Phutthayotfa Chulalok class
- Subclasses: Type 053 frigate
- Built: 1989–1992
- In commission: 1991–present
- Completed: 4
- Active: 4

General characteristics
- Type: Guided-missile frigate
- Displacement: 1,676 long tons (1,703 t) standard; 1,924 long tons (1,955 t) full
- Length: 103.2 m (338 ft 7 in)
- Beam: 11.3 m (37 ft 1 in)
- Draught: 3.1 m (10 ft 2 in)
- Propulsion: 4 × MTU 20V1163 TB83 diesel engines, driving two shafts with controllable pitch propellers
- Speed: 30 knots (56 km/h) max
- Range: 3,500 nautical miles (6,500 km) at 18 knots (33 km/h)
- Complement: 168
- Sensors & processing systems: As built; Type 354 Eye Shield air/surface radar; Type 352C Square Tie surface search radar; Type 343 Sun Visor fire control radar (for 100mm); Type 341 Rice Lamp fire control radar (for 37mm); Racal-Decca 1290 A/D ARPA Navigation radar; Anritsu RA 71CA Navigation radar; Type 651 IFF; Type ZKJ-3 or STN Atlas mini COSYS combat management system; Type SJD-5A sonar
- Electronic warfare & decoys: ESM Type 923-1 intercept; ECM Type 981-3 deception jammer; Decoys 2 × Type 945 GPJ chaff launchers
- Armament: 1–2 × 100 mm/56 Type 79 twin-barreled guns; 4 × 37 mm Type 76 twin-barreled guns; 8 × C-801 SSM launchers; 2 × Type 86 anti-submarine rocket launchers; 2 × BMB depth charge racks
- Aircraft carried: 1 × Bell 212 (Type 053HT (H) only)
- Aviation facilities: Flight deck (Type 053HT (H) only)

The Chao Phraya-class frigate (also referred as Type 053HT and Type 053HT (H)) is a version of the Chinese-built Type 053H2 frigate operated by the Royal Thai Navy.

== Design ==
Chao Phraya class has a length of 103.2 m (339 ft), a beam of 11.3 m (37 ft), a draught of 3.1 m (10 ft) and displacement of 1,676 long tons (1,703 t) standard and 1,924 long tons (1,955 t) at full load. The class has two shafts and powered with four MTU 20V1163 TB83 diesel engines with 29,440 shp (21,950 kW). The ships has a range of 3,500 nautical miles (6,500 km) while cruising at 18 knots (33 km/h) and top speed of 30 knots (56 km/h). Chao Phraya class has a complement of 168 personnel, including 22 officers.

The Type 053HT subclass are armed with two 100 mm/56 Type 79 twin-barreled guns, each on the fore and aft of the ship, and four 37 mm Type 76 twin-barreled guns. For anti-submarine warfare, the ships is equipped with two Type 86 anti-submarine rocket launchers and two BMB depth charge racks. For surface warfare, the ships is equipped with eight C-801 anti-ship missile launchers.

Type 053HT (H) subclass has slightly different weaponries, with the aft 100 mm twin-barreled gun replaced with flight deck facility and able to carry a single helicopter.

As built, the class sensors and electronics consisted of Type 354 Eye Shield air/surface radar, Type 352C Square Tie surface search radar, Type 343 Sun Visor fire control radar for 100 mm guns, Type 341 Rice Lamp fire control radar for 37 mm guns, Racal-Decca 1290 A/D ARPA and Anritsu RA 71CA Navigation radar, Type 651 IFF, Type ZKJ-3 or STN Atlas mini COSYS combat management system, Type SJD-5A sonar, ESM Type 923-1 intercept, ECM Type 981-3 deception jammer and two Type 945 GPJ chaff launchers.

The two Type 053HT (H) ships, Kraburi and Saiburi, underwent modernization program in 2009. The upgrade includes replacement of old weapons and electronic systems with newer systems, which consisted of 100 mm/56 Type 79A twin-barreled gun and its TR47C fire control radar with FCU17C-2 calculator system, Poseidon III combat management system replacing the old ZKJ-3, 37 mm Type 76A twin-barreled remote-controlled guns with the TR47C fire control radar with FCU17C-1 calculator system, ESM ES-3601-10 replacing the Type 923-1 and Type 981-3 systems, SR-60 air/surface radar, and the installation of new C-802A anti-ship missiles.

In August 2020, Royal Thai Navy planned to modernizes the two Type 053HT ships, Chao Phraya and Bangpakong to have similar capabilities to a modern offshore patrol vessel. The planned upgrade includes replacing the 100 mm guns with 76/62 automatic guns and all four 37 mm guns with a rapid-fire 30 mm autocannon, along with new combat management systems and surveillance systems.

== Ships in the class ==
Name	Number	Builder	Launched	Commissioned	Decommissioned	Status
Type 053HT
HTMS Chao Phraya	455	Hudong Shipyard	24 June 1990	5 April 1991		Active
HTMS Bangpakong	456	Hudong Shipyard	25 July 1990	20 July 1991		Active
Type 053HT (H)
HTMS Kraburi	457	Hudong Shipyard	28 December 1990	16 January 1992		Active
HTMS Saiburi	458	Hudong Shipyard	27 August 1991	4 August 1992		Active
