= HTMS Bangpakong (FFG-456) =

Thai frigate

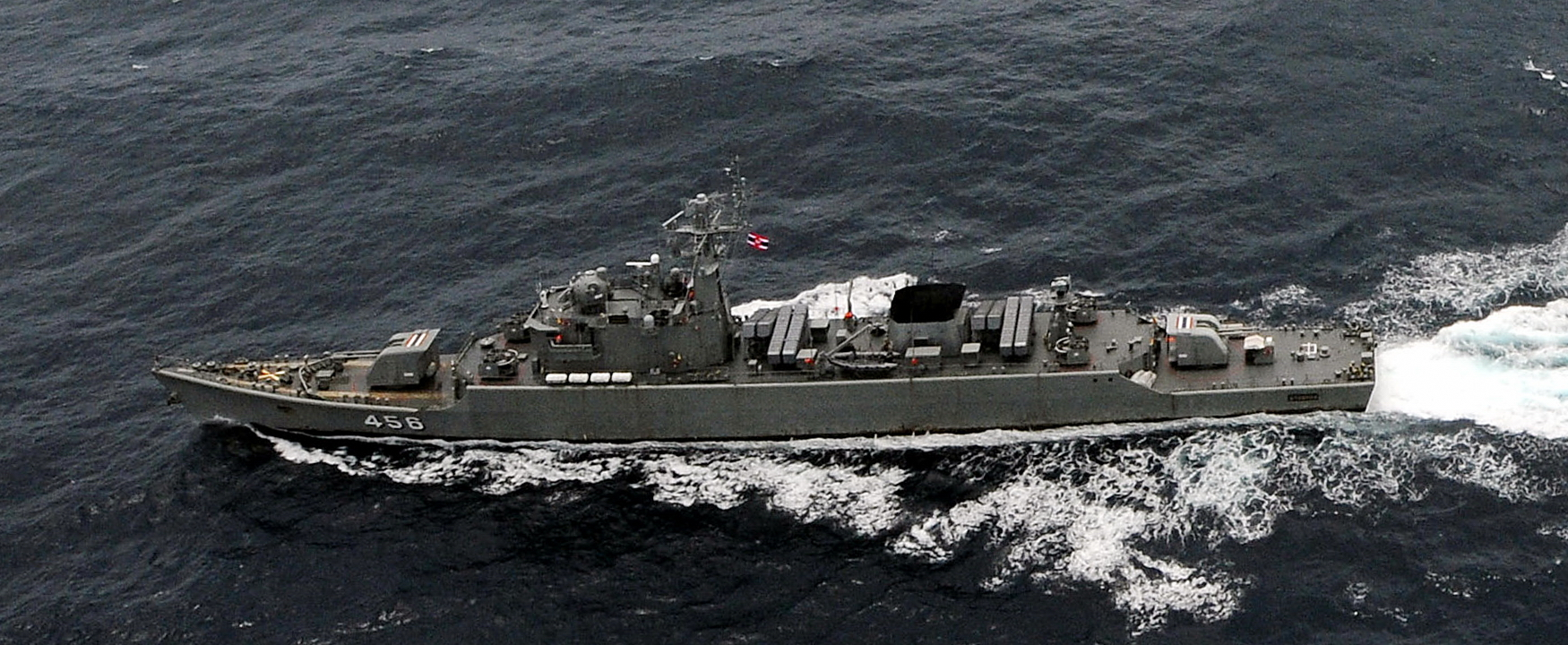
- HTMS Bangpakong at sea in 2009

History

Thailand
- Name: HTMS Bangpakong
- Namesake: Bang Pakong River
- Ordered: 18 July 1988
- Builder: Hudong Shipyard, Shanghai
- Laid down: April 1989
- Launched: 25 July 1990
- Commissioned: 20 July 1991
- Status: In service

General characteristics
- Class & type: Chao Phraya-class frigate
- Displacement: 1,676 long tons (1,703 t) standard; 1,924 long tons (1,955 t) full
- Length: 103.2 m (338 ft 7 in)
- Beam: 11.3 m (37 ft 1 in)
- Draught: 3.1 m (10 ft 2 in)
- Propulsion: 4 × MTU 20V1163 TB83 diesel engines, driving two shafts with controllable pitch propellers
- Speed: 30 knots (56 km/h) max
- Range: 3,500 nautical miles (6,500 km) at 18 knots (33 km/h)
- Complement: 168
- Sensors & processing systems: Type 354 Eye Shield air/surface radar; Type 352C Square Tie surface search radar; Type 343 Sun Visor fire control radar (for 100mm); Type 341 Rice Lamp fire control radar (for 37mm); Racal-Decca 1290 A/D ARPA Navigation radar; Anritsu RA 71CA Navigation radar; Type 651 IFF; STN Atlas mini COSYS combat management system; Type SJD-5A sonar
- Electronic warfare & decoys: ESM Type 923-1 intercept; ECM Type 981-3 deception jammer; Decoys 2 × Type 945 GPJ chaff launchers
- Armament: 2 × 100 mm/56 Type 79 twin-barreled guns; 4 × 37 mm Type 76 twin-barreled guns; 8 × C-801 SSM launchers; 2 × Type 86 anti-submarine rocket launchers; 2 × BMB depth charge racks

HTMS Bangpakong (FFG-456) (Thai: เรือหลวงบางปะกง) is the second ship of Chao Phraya-class frigate of the Royal Thai Navy, a variant of the Chinese-built Type 053H2 frigate.

== Design and description ==
Bangpakong has a length of 103.2 m (339 ft), a beam of 11.3 m (37 ft), a draught of 3.1 m (10 ft) and displacement of 1,676 long tons (1,703 t) standard and 1,924 long tons (1,955 t) at full load. The ship has two shafts and powered with four MTU 20V1163 TB83 diesel engines with 29,440 shp (21,950 kW). The ship has a range of 3,500 nautical miles (6,500 km) while cruising at 18 knots (33 km/h) and top speed of 30 knots (56 km/h). Bangpakong has a complement of 168 personnel, including 22 officers.

As a Type 053HT frigate, the ship are armed with two 100 mm/56 Type 79 twin-barreled guns and four 37 mm Type 76 twin-barreled guns. For anti-submarine warfare, the ship is equipped with two Type 86 anti-submarine rocket launchers and two BMB depth charge racks. For surface warfare, Bangpakong is equipped with eight C-801 anti-ship missile launchers.

In August 2020, Royal Thai Navy planned to modernize Bangpakong and Chao Phraya to have similar capabilities to a modern offshore patrol vessel. The planned upgrade includes replacing the 100 mm guns with 76/62 automatic guns and all four 37 mm guns with a rapid-fire 30 mm autocannon, along with new combat management systems and surveillance systems.

== Construction and career ==
The four ships of the class was ordered on 18 July 1988. Bangpakong was laid down in April 1989 at Hudong Shipyard, Shanghai. The ship was launched on 25 July 1990 and was commissioned on 20 July 1991. Upon the ship completion and arrival on Thailand, the shipbuilding quality were deemed to be unsatisfactory and works was needed to improve the ship. The damage control abilities were also upgraded before she entered service.

Upon entering service, Bangpakong and her sisters were frequently used for training and rotated monthly to the Coast Guard.

Bangpakong and Naresuan attended a fleet review off the coast of Qingdao on 23 April 2019 on the occasion of 70th Anniversary of the People's Liberation Army Navy.
