= Olympic class =

Olympic class may refer to

- Racing shell, an Olympic class boat raced at the Summer Olympics, also known as a fine boat
- Olympic sailing classes, a class of sail boats currently raced in the Summer Olympic sailing program as well as boat varieties formerly raced
- Olympic-class ocean liner, a trio of ocean liners built in the early 20th century, comprising RMS Olympic, RMS Titanic, and HMHS Britannic
- Olympics-class submarine, the unofficial name for a Chinese submarine first reported on in 2022
