= Type 039A/B/C submarine =

Chinese diesel-electric submarine class

- Type 039B-class profile

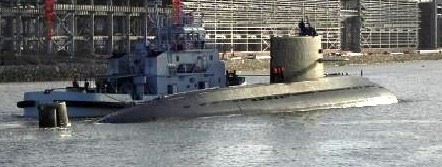
- Type 039A submarine

Class overview
- Name: Type 039A; Type 039B; Type 039C
- Builders: Wuchang Shipbuilding, Wuhan
- Operators: Current operators: People's Liberation Army Navy; Pakistan Navy; Future operators; Royal Thai Navy
- Preceded by: Type 039
- Succeeded by: Type 041
- Subclasses: Hangor class (Pakistan); Matchanu class (Thailand) (under construction)
- In commission: 2006–present
- Planned: ≥25
- Completed: ≥22
- Active: At least 22 submarines: ≥1 Type 039C; Per United States Department of Defense: 21 Type 039A and Type 039B combined; Per International Institute for Strategic Studies: 4 Type 039A and 16 Type 039B

General characteristics
- Type: Attack submarine
- Displacement: 3,600 t (3,500 long tons) (submerged)
- Length: 77.6 m (254 ft 7 in)
- Beam: 8.4 m (27 ft 7 in)
- Draft: 6.7 m (22 ft 0 in)
- Propulsion: Diesel-electric, 1 shaft, AIP
- Speed: 20 knots (37 km/h; 23 mph)
- Test depth: 250 m (820 ft)
- Complement: 36
- Armament: 6 × 533 mm (21 in) torpedo tubes for: Yu-10 torpedoes; Yu-6 torpedoes; Anti-ship cruise missiles including YJ-82, YJ-18 (Type 039A and Type 039B) and YJ-19 (Type 039B and Type 039C)

The Type 039A/B/C submarine (Note: Sometimes also referred to as Type 041.) (NATO reporting name: Yuan class) is a family of three air-independent propulsion (AIP) equipped diesel-electric submarine classes in China's People's Liberation Army Navy. It is the China's first AIP equipped submarine family. The Type 39A class is the successor of the Type 039 submarine. The class is designed to replace the aging Type 033 (Romeo class) and the older Type 035 submarines that previously formed the backbone of the conventional submarine force. The type 39A class is armed with wired-guided and wake-homing torpedoes, long-range land-attack and anti-ship cruise missiles, and naval mines.

According to an early assessment by the US Naval Institute, the Type 39A class was primarily designed as "an anti-ship cruise missile (ASCM) platform capable of hiding submerged for long periods of time in difficult to access shallow littorals." However, another assessment by USNI includes an open-ocean capability which can be used beyond coastal waters. Also updated was its role within China's naval fleet, and as of August 2015 it is considered to be a more traditional attack submarine, with a secondary ASCM role.

== Design ==
The design of the Type 39A class is thought to be modeled on, or heavily influenced by, the Russian Kilo class. In addition, the design also appears to show some similarities to the Chinese Song class. When it comes to general performance it is believed that the Type 039A could be comparable to the improved Project 636 variant of the Kilo class. Submarines of the Type 039A design have been built at Wuhan Shipyard and Jiangnan Shipyard.

=== Hull ===
The Type 39A class submarines have a teardrop-shaped hull and are believed to be double-hulled. They also have a angled casing, which appears like a distinctive hump. While earlier variants of the Type 39A class have a large upright sail, newer variants have instead a more angled sail.

The Type 039A inherits the tail design of the Type 039 submarine with upper and lower rudders and sternplanes with a single propeller shaft. A pair of fairwater dive planes are positioned on the sail. The submarine is equipped with indigenously developed machinery rafts (shock absorbers) system that helped to reduce noise level by over 35 dB. Additionally, the submarine is covered with rubber anti-sonar anechoic tiles to reduce the risk of acoustic detection.

=== Armament ===
The Type 39A class has six 533 mm (21 in) torpedo tubes, which are located at the bow. These can be used to launch indigenous torpedoes such as the Yu-3, Yu-4 and the Yu-6. Furthermore, the submarines of the Type 39A class are also capable of launching the YJ-82 or YJ-18 anti-ship missiles. In addition, they can be armed with naval mines. The general designer of the torpedo and missile launching system is Sun Zhuguo (孙柱国).

=== Combat control systems ===
China was known to have imported the Thales TSM 2233 ELEDONE / DSUV-22 and Thales TSM 2255 / DUUX-5 from France during the 1980s and early 1990s. It also has access to a wide range of modern Russian sonar systems (MG-519 MOUSE ROAR, MGK-500 SHARK GILL) through its purchase of the Kilo class. Comparable systems are expected to be copied for the Type 039A. It is likely to be fitted with a comparable surface/air search radar similar to the MRK-50 SNOOP TRAY, a commercial navigation radar like a Furuno unit observed on a number of the Type 039 class and ESM system is comparable to the Type 921A.

=== Propulsion ===
The Type 39A class is equipped with an air-independent propulsion (AIP) system. The AIP system is believed to be using closed-cycle Stirling engine technology. According to the Chinese newspaper Science and Technology Daily (科技日报), this 039A class is equipped with an air-independent propulsion system developed by the 711th Research Institute of the China Shipbuilding Heavy Industry Group Corp. In 1998, the first experimental sample was built and a decade later and after a dozen technological breakthroughs, a wide range of matured versions became commercially available and the newest diesel-electric submarine in Chinese navy became the first customer. Although the official Chinese source had not mentioned the exact class of the submarine, it is generally accepted that the class is no other than Type 039A class, since it is the newest conventional powered submarine in the Chinese navy. The engine is built by Shanghai Qiyao Propulsion Technology Ltd. (上海齐耀动力技术有限公司), a wholly owned subsidiary of the 711th Institute.

=== Noise ===
The Type 39A-class SSK is integrated with advanced noise reduction techniques including anechoic tiles, passive/active noise reduction, asymmetrical seven-blade skewed propeller, the 039A is expected to be as quiet as other modern diesel-electric submarines, which are difficult to track.

== Variants ==
=== China ===
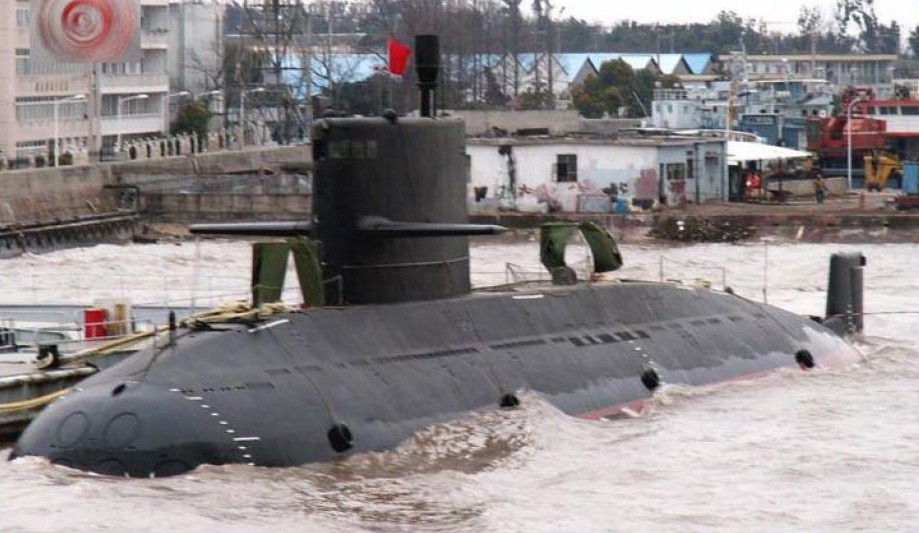
Chinese Type 039A diesel-electric submarine, NATO reporting name: Yuan class.

A total of four variants of Type 039A have been developed by the first half of 2014, and they are listed here in chronological order based on their public debut:

- Type 039A: Original Type 39A class, comprising four units (Changcheng 330 to Changcheng 333). The most obvious external visual difference between Type 039A and its predecessor Type 039/039G Song-class submarine is in the conning tower. The conning tower of Type 039A is similar to that of Type 039G, but the tower lacks the fin-shaped extrusion on the rear section of the conning towers of both the Type 039 and the Type 039G.
- Type 039AG: This second member of the Type 039A series is frequently, but erroneously, identified as its successor, the Type 039B, because the two versions appear the same above the waterline. The only difference lies below the waterline, which is not readily observed. It is believed that all Type 039AG submarines have been converted to Type 039B. The most obvious external visual difference between the Type 039AG, its successor the Type 039B, and the earlier Type 039A submarine is in the conning tower: the sharply angled edge at the top of the conning tower of the Type 039A has been replaced with a smooth, rounded transition. There is also a bulge in the middle of this smooth transition in the forward portion of the conning tower, housing some kind of sensor, which is a new feature that the earlier Type 039A lacks.
- Type 039B: This third member of Type 039A series looks identical to earlier Type 039AG from which it is developed from. Including those units upgraded as mentioned below, it comprises thirteen units (Changcheng 334 to Changcheng 346). The biggest difference between Type 039B and Type 039AG is that Type 039B has incorporated flank sonar array, which was subsequently retrofitted on Type 039AG and some earlier boats. This difference, however, is not readily observable because the flank array is installed at the lower portion of the hull. It was only in the early 2010s when a Type 039B built by Shanghai Changxing (长兴) Shipyard exposed in the berth, when the flank array of Type 039B became publicized, thus distinguish the type from earlier Type 039AG that lacked the flank sonar.
- Type 039B (upgraded): The fourth variant of the Type 39A has been first publicized in December 2013, with a modified hull and redesigned conning tower with extrusion at the root of the conning tower in both the bow and stern direction, similar to that of conning tower of Virginia-class submarine. In addition, the bulge housing unknown sensors on board Type 039B in the forward section of the top edge of the conning tower is absent on the new boat launched in April 2014, but there are three white lines at the top of edge of the conning tower on both sides, presumably for environmental sensors. This new boat is claimed to be an upgraded variant of Type 039B.
- Type 039C: A new variant commissioned from 2022 onwards with redesigned stealth sail. First spotted in May 2021 in Wuhan. It has been noted that the redesigned stealth sail looks similar to the sail of the Swedish A26 Blekinge class submarine. However, there are some noticeable differences, such as the sail of the Type 39C having a less blended lower part and the fairwater planes (hydroplanes) being mounted very differently. Besides a redesigned sail this variant also has a noticeably wider casing and the outer shape of the hatch appears to have been cut in the form of a square. It comprises three units commissioned to date, with another five under development. This class was tentatively called "Olympics-class" before a clear identification with the Type 39A-class is made, as a video originally surfaced on Chinese social media around the time of 2022 Winter Olympics in Beijing.

A satellite image of the Wuchang Shipyard, dating to 26 April 2024, was acquired by Tom Shugart, an adjunct senior fellow at the Center for a New American Security (CNAS) think tank and retired U.S. Navy submarine warfare officer, whom was first to notice the new boat, at the Wuchang Shipyard, in Wuhan. The new design features X shaped stern control planes. Further images began circulating in December showing a submarine with "X" planes and a lockout chamber on top of the deck. Chinese users on Facebook pointed out that the submarine was allegedly a modified Type 039C. H.I Sutton, an author at USNI News, stated on Twitter that "Some things look right to me, except... no way they are already testing DDS on this submarine, much too quick development is my gut feel"

Of the first seventeen units (Types 039A and 039B), ten vessels (numbers 330 to 339) are active with the East Sea Fleet, two vessels (numbers 340 and 341) with the North Sea Fleet, and five vessels (numbers 342 to 346) with the South Sea Fleet.

=== Export ===
- S20: At IDEX-2013, China revealed a scaled-down version of Type 039A submarine designated as S20, specially intended for export. The main difference between the S20 and Type 039A is that the AIP system is believed to be optional. Due to its modular design, a variety of sensors and weapons can also be easily adopted up on customers' requests. Specifications of S20:
  - Structure: double hulled
  - Length: 66 meter
  - Beam: 8 meter
  - Draft: 8.2 meter
  - Surface displacement: 1,850 tons
  - Submerged displacement: 2,300 tons
  - Maximum speed: 18 knots
  - Cruise speed: 16 knots
  - Range: 8000 nautical miles at 16 knots
  - Endurance: 60 days
  - Crew: 38 total
  - Maximum depth: 300 meters
- The full-size platform has been modified for export. See section immediately below.

== Export ==
- Royal Thai Navy: On 2 July 2015, the Royal Thai Navy (RTN) formally selected China's Yuan-class platform to meet a requirement for three submarines. The RTN's procurement committee voted unanimously in favour of purchasing the submarine, which has been designated S26T (Thailand), a modified export version of the Yuan class. On 1 July 2016, the RTN submitted a funding plan for its 36 billion baht submarine procurement project to the cabinet for consideration with the expenditure to be spread over 11 years. If approved, the first submarine would be bought for 13 billion baht between fiscal years 2017–2021. The second and third submarines would be purchased during the remainder of the 11-year period. In May 2017, the Royal Thai Navy and Thai Government signed a contract for one S26T variant of the submarine in a $390 million deal. Orders for an additional two submarines are expected in the coming years. Steel cutting ceremony of the first S26T submarine was held on 4 September 2018 at Wuhan, China.
- Pakistan Navy: (See Hangor-class submarine.) In April 2015, the Government of Pakistan approved purchase of 8 export version of Type 039B (Upgraded) from China for $5 billion for the Pakistan Navy. The deal was finalised on 23 July 2015. In October of the same year, it was revealed that four of the eight of the submarines will be built in Pakistan, with work beginning in both nations simultaneously. Pakistan's Minister for Defense Production confirmed that the agreement included transfer-of-technology to construct the vessels. On 6 July 2015, Tanveer Hussain, minister of defence production, announced two projects for the construction of four submarines in China and four in Pakistan will begin simultaneously. Hussain added that a training centre will also be created at KSEW. In late 2016 it was officially confirmed that China will see about four submarines delivered by 2023 and the remainder delivered by 2028. The first submarine was delivered and inducted on the 4th of May 2026.

== See also ==
- List of submarine classes in service
- Type 032 submarine, a test-bed submarine resembling an enlarged Type 039A.

Equivalent submarines of the same era

- Sōryū class
- Project 636.3
- Dosan Ahn Changho class

== Notes ==
=== Bibliography ===
- Bateman, Sam; Ho, Joshua, eds. (2010). Southeast Asia and the Rise of Chinese and Indian Naval Power: Between Rising Naval Powers. Routledge Security in Asia Pacific Series. Abingdon: Routledge. ISBN 978-0-415-55955-3.
- Cole, Bernard D. (2016). China's Quest for Great Power: Ships, Oil, and Foreign Policy. Annapolis, Maryland: Naval Institute Press. ISBN 9781612518381.
- Haddick, Robert (2014). Fire on the Water: China, America, and the Future of the Pacific. Annapolis, Maryland: Naval Institute Press. ISBN 978-0-87021-060-0.
- Holmes, James R.; Yoshihara, Toshi (2008). Chinese Naval Strategy in the 21st Century: The turn to Mahan. Naval Policy and History. Abingdon: Routledge. ISBN 978-0-415-77213-6.
- Howarth, Peter (2006). China's Rising Sea Power: The PLA Navy's Submarine Challenge. Asian Security Studies. Abingdon: Routledge. ISBN 978-0-415-36891-9.
- International Institute for Strategic Studies (2024). The Military Balance 2024 (Report). Routledge. ISBN 978-1-032-78004-7.
- The International Institute for Strategic Studies (2025). The Military Balance 2025. London: Routledge. ISBN 978-1-041-04967-8.
- Kirchberger, Sarah (2015). Assessing China's Naval Power: Technological Innovation, Economic Constraints, and Strategic Implications. Global Power Shift. Heidelberg: Springer. ISBN 978-3-662-47126-5.
- Saunders, Stephen, ed. (2009). Jane's Fighting Ships 2009-2010. Coulsdon, Surrey: Janes Information Group. ISBN 978-0-7106-2888-6.
- Saunders, Stephen, ed. (2015). IHS Jane's Fighting Ships 2015-2016. Coulsdon, Surrey: Janes Information Group. ISBN 978-0-7106-3143-5.
- Waters, Conrad, ed. (2021). Seaforth World Naval Review 2022. Barnsley: Seaforth Publishing. ISBN 978-1-3990-1895-1.
