= Type 039 submarine =

Diesel electric submarine class

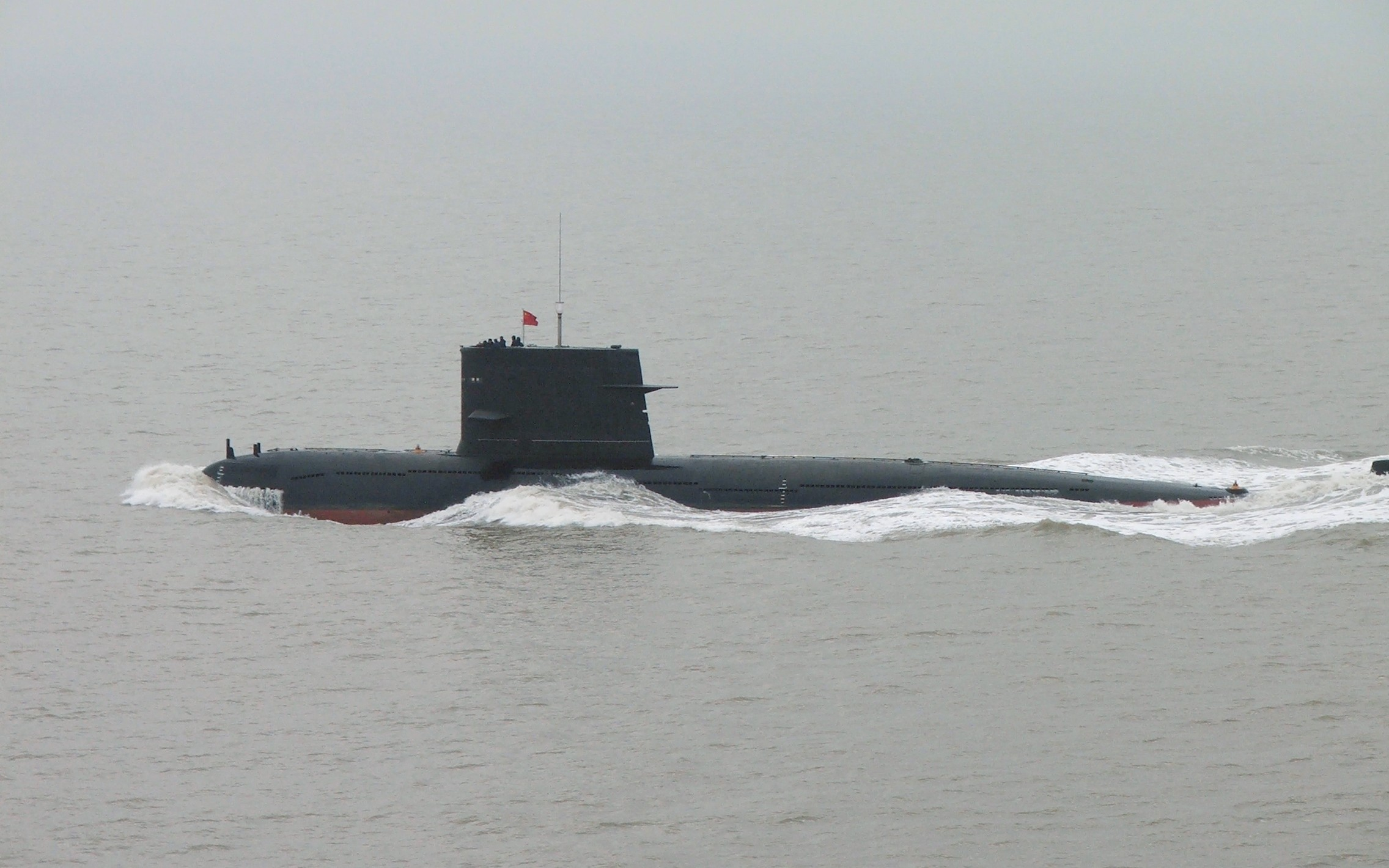
- A Type 039 submarine

Class overview
- Name: Song class
- Builders: Wuhan Shipbuilding; Jiangnan Shipyard
- Operators: People's Liberation Army Navy
- Preceded by: Type 035
- Succeeded by: Type 039A
- In commission: 1998–present
- Planned: 13
- Completed: 13
- Active: 13

General characteristics
- Type: Submarine
- Displacement: 2,250 tonnes (submerged)
- Length: 74.9 m (245 ft 9 in)
- Beam: 8.4 m (27 ft 7 in)
- Draft: 5.3 m (17 ft 5 in)
- Propulsion: diesel-electric, 1 shaft
- Speed: 22 knots (41 km/h)
- Test depth: 300 m (980 ft)
- Complement: 60
- Armament: 6 × 533 mm (21 in) torpedo tubes, for: 18 × torpedoes; or: 36 × naval mines

The Type 039 submarine (NATO reporting name: Song class) is a class of diesel-electric submarines of the People's Liberation Army Navy. The class is the first diesel-electric submarine to be made in China and also the first Chinese made diesel-electric submarine to use the teardrop hull shape. Altogether thirteen vessels were completed to the Type 039 design between 1999 and 2006.

== Design ==
The submarine uses a modern teardrop-shape hull for underwater performance. The hull incorporates four rudders and is propelled by a single propeller. The engine is imported from Germany. For quieter operation, the engine was mounted with shock absorbers and the hull is plated in rubber tiles for sound deadening. Development was not without problems, as a lengthy testing period for the first vessel (320) attests. Problems with noise levels and underwater performance led to revisions in the design and only a single boat was ever built to the original specification.

Improvements led to the specification for the Type 039G, which became the bulk of production, with five of the type entering service, followed by seven of a slightly improved. Elimination of the stepped design for the conning tower is the primary visual cue for identification of the G variant.

This class has three versions: the original Type 039 (only the prototype, commissioned 1999, and bearing the hull number Changcheng 320; Type 039G (five vessels commissioned 2001 to 2004, bearing the hull numbers Changcheng 321 to Changcheng 325); and the improved Type 039G1 (three vessels commissioned 2003 to 2005, bearing the hull numbers Changcheng 314 to Changcheng 316, and four vessels commissioned 2006, bearing the hull numbers Changcheng 326 to Changcheng 329). Hull numbers 315, 316, 320 to 323, 327 and 328 are active with the North Sea Fleet, 324, 325 and 314 with the East Sea Fleet, and 326 and 329 with the South Sea Fleet.

The most obvious visual difference between the first two variants is the conning tower. The Type 039's conning tower is stepped, rising aft. In an effort to shrink the submarine's acoustic signature, the Type 039G's conning tower was given a more conventional shape without any step.

=== Weapons ===
Primary weapon for the Type 039 is the 533 mm (21 in) Yu-4 torpedo, a locally produced passive homing 40-knot (74 km/h) torpedo based on the SAET-50 and roughly comparable to the SAET-60. Surface targets may be attacked at up to 15 km (9.3 mi). Yu-6 wire-guided torpedoes may also be used for targeting submarines. It is also likely that the Type 039 is capable of carrying the YJ-8 missile, a cruise missile which can be launched from the same tube as the boat's torpedoes, and can target surface vessels at up to 80 km (50 mi). The missile is subsonic and carries a 165 kg (364 lb) warhead. For mining operations, in place of torpedoes, the submarine can carry 24 to 36 naval mines, deliverable through the torpedo tubes. The general designer of the torpedo and missile launching system is Sun Zhuguo (孙柱国), and the launching system is compatible with AShM, ASW, torpedoes of both China and Russian/Soviet origin.

Although Type 039 has successfully test fired the CY-1 ASW missile underwater like the Yuan-class submarine, the status of the missile is in question because nothing is heard about it entering mass production. The CY-1 ASW missile has a maximum range of 18 km (11 mi).

=== Sensors ===
The main sensor is the medium-frequency sonar mounted in the bow of the submarine, with passive and active modes, which is used for both search and attack. In addition, the system offers a method of underwater communications and also functions as a torpedo approach warning system. This sonar is the Chinese development of French Thomson-CSF TSM-2233 sonar and is capable of simultaneously tracking 4 to 12 targets depending on the function it is used for. To enhance passive search capabilities, a low frequency sonar of French Thomson-CSF TSM-2255 design is mounted on the flanks of the hull, with a maximum range in excess of 30 km (19 mi) and capable of simultaneously tracking four targets. The system is further enhanced with the integration of a domestic Chinese passive ranging sonar on board, designated as H/SQG-04 sonar. For surface search, a small I-band radar is fitted.

This class is the first Chinese submarine to be fitted with an integrated electronic support measures / radio direction finder / radar warning receiver system designated as SRW209 Submarine Radar Reconnaissance Equipment, which works at S - Ku bands with 100% detection rate. The SRW209 is fully automatic and can be either operated by a single operator with a console with a color CRT (which can be replaced by LCD) display console, or linked to the combat data system, which is capable of tracking multiple targets.

== Export potential ==
China offered the Type 039 submarine for sale to Thailand in 2007. However, the Royal Thai Navy lacked the infrastructure to support the submarines. Thailand later ordered S26T submarine, an export version of the Type 039A.

== Service history ==
On 26 October 2006, a Chinese Type 039 submarine "popped up" and "surfaced within firing range of its torpedoes and missiles before being detected" within 5 nautical miles (9 km) of the carrier USS Kitty Hawk while she was operating in the East China Sea between Japan and Taiwan. It was spotted by an F/A-18C aviator and confirmed by the crew of an EA-6B from the Kitty Hawk's Air Wing. In 2025 the Chinese submarine 320 was observed with mountings on her aft casing, which could be used for equipping some sort of container or vehicle.

== See also ==
- List of submarine classes in service

=== Equivalent submarines of the same era ===
- Dolphin class
- Gotland class
- Scorpène class
- Heroine class
- Type 212A
