= Network analyzer (electrical) =

Instrument that measures the network parameters of electrical networks

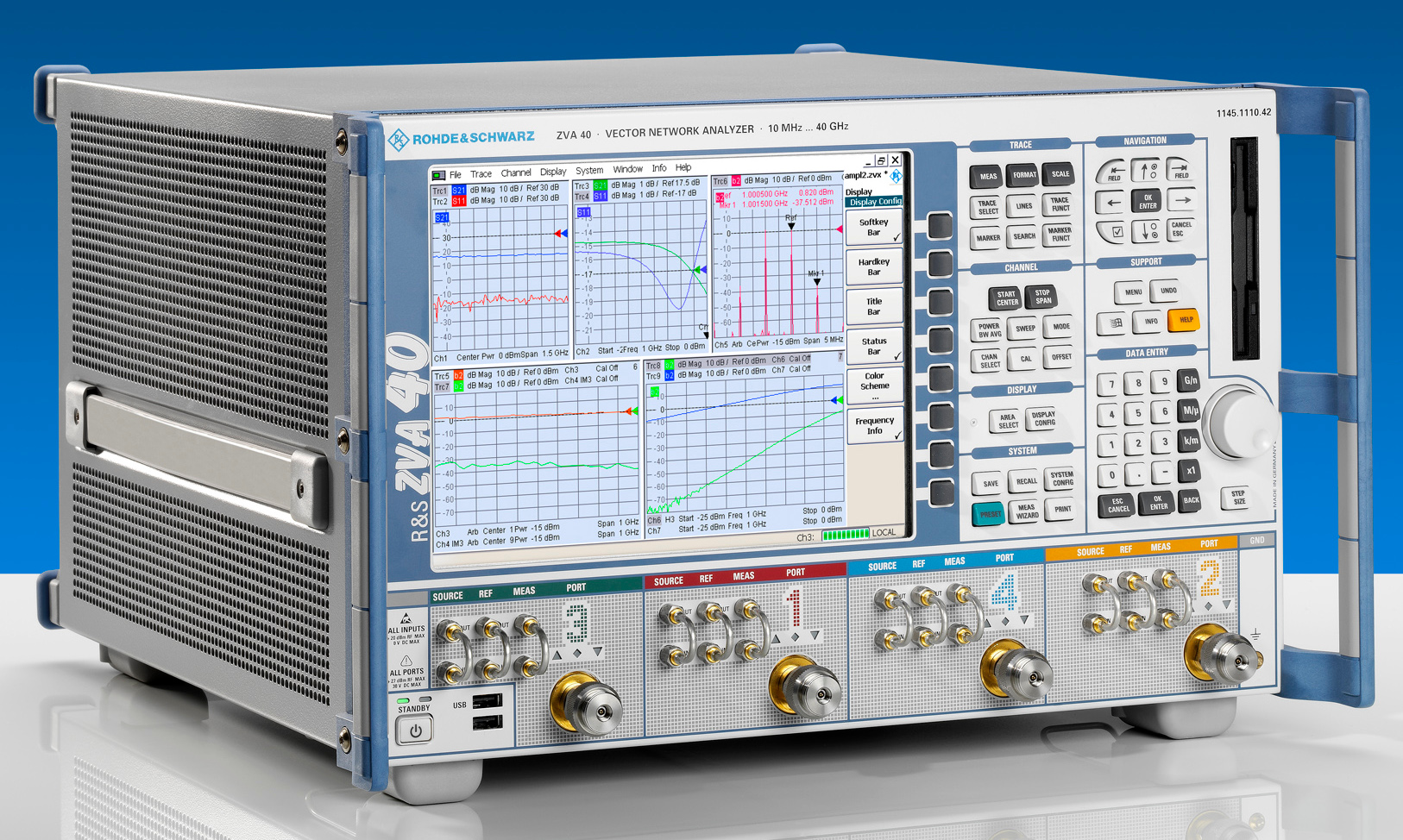
ZVA40 vector network analyzer from Rohde & Schwarz.

A network analyzer is an instrument that measures the network parameters of electrical networks. Today, network analyzers commonly measure s–parameters because reflection and transmission of electrical networks are easy to measure at high frequencies, but there are other network parameter sets such as y-parameters, z-parameters, and h-parameters. Network analyzers are often used to characterize two-port networks such as amplifiers and filters, but they can be used on networks with an arbitrary number of ports.

== Overview ==
Network analyzers are used mostly at high frequencies; operating frequencies can range from 1 Hz to 1.5 THz. Special types of network analyzers can also cover lower frequency ranges down to 1 Hz. These network analyzers can be used, for example, for the stability analysis of open loops or for the measurement of audio and ultrasonic components.

The two basic types of network analyzers are

- scalar network analyzer (SNA)—measures amplitude properties only
- vector network analyzer (VNA)—measures both amplitude and phase properties

A VNA is a form of RF network analyzer widely used for RF design applications. A VNA may also be called a gain–phase meter or an automatic network analyzer. An SNA is functionally identical to a spectrum analyzer in combination with a tracking generator. As of 2007, VNAs are the most common type of network analyzers, and so references to an unqualified "network analyzer" most often mean a VNA. Seven prominent VNA manufacturers are Keysight, Anritsu, Advantest, Rohde & Schwarz, SIGLENT Technologies, Copper Mountain Technologies, and OMICRON Lab.

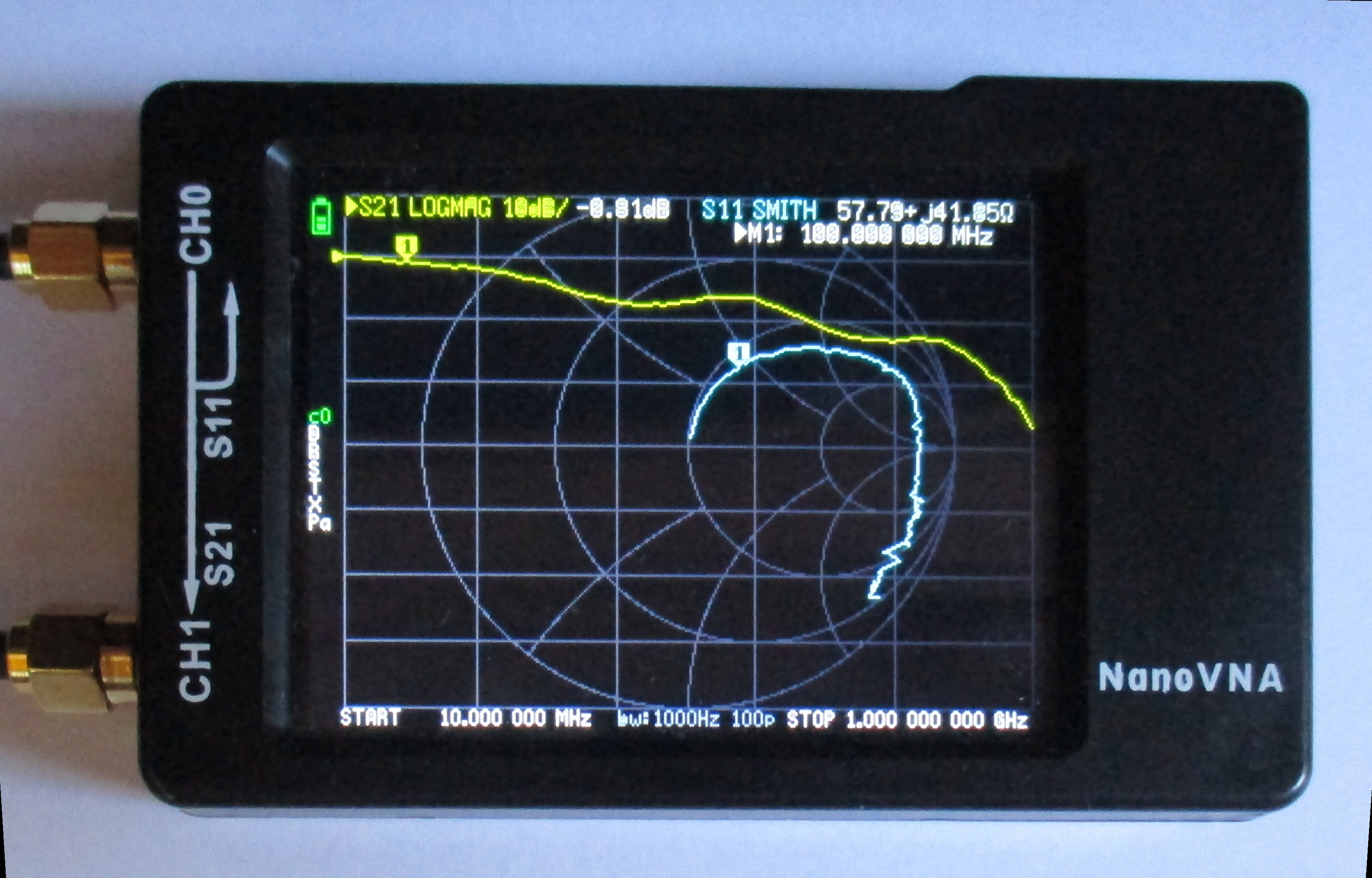
NanoVNA vector network analyzer displaying the S-parameters $s_{1,1}$ and $s_{2,1}$ (the reflection and transmission coefficients respectively) overlaid on a Smith chart.

For some years now, entry-level devices and do-it-yourself projects have also been available, some for less than $100, mainly from the amateur radio sector. Although these have significantly reduced features compared to professional devices and offer only a limited range of functions, they are often sufficient for private users - especially during studies and for hobby applications up to the single-digit GHz range.

Another category of network analyzer is the microwave transition analyzer (MTA) or large-signal network analyzer (LSNA), which measure both amplitude and phase of the fundamental and harmonics. The MTA was commercialized before the LSNA, but was lacking some of the user-friendly calibration features now available with the LSNA.

== Architecture ==
The basic architecture of a network analyzer involves a signal generator, a test set, one or more receivers and display. In some setups, these units are distinct instruments. Most VNAs have two test ports, permitting measurement of four S-parameters $(S_{11}, S_{21}, S_{12}, S_{22})$, but instruments with more than two ports are available commercially.

=== Signal generator ===
The network analyzer needs a test signal, and a signal generator or signal source will provide one. Older network analyzers did not have their own signal generator, but had the ability to control a stand-alone signal generator using, for example, a GPIB connection. Nearly all modern network analyzers have a built-in signal generator. High-performance network analyzers have two built-in sources. Two built-in sources are useful for applications such as mixer test, where one source provides the RF signal, another the LO; or amplifier intermodulation testing, where two tones are required for the test.

=== Test set ===
The test set takes the signal generator output and routes it to the device under test, and it routes the signal to be measured to the receivers. It often splits off a reference channel for the incident wave. In a SNA, the reference channel may go to a diode detector (receiver) whose output is sent to the signal generator's automatic level control. The result is better control of the signal generator's output and better measurement accuracy. In a VNA, the reference channel goes to the receivers; it is needed to serve as a phase reference.

Directional couplers or two resistor power dividers are used for signal separation. Some microwave test sets include the front end mixers for the receivers (e.g., test sets for HP 8510).

=== Receiver ===
The receivers make the measurements. A network analyzer will have one or more receivers connected to its test ports. The reference test port is usually labeled R, and the primary test ports are A, B, C, ... Some analyzers will dedicate a separate receiver to each test port, but others share one or two receivers among the ports. The R receiver may be less sensitive than the receivers used on the test ports.

For the SNA, the receiver only measures the magnitude of the signal. A receiver can be a detector diode that operates at the test frequency. The simplest SNA will have a single test port, but more accurate measurements are made when a reference port is also used. The reference port will compensate for amplitude variations in the test signal at the measurement plane. It is possible to share a single detector and use it for both the reference port and the test port by making two measurement passes.

For the VNA, the receiver measures both the magnitude and the phase of the signal. It needs a reference channel (R) to determine the phase, so a VNA needs at least two receivers. The usual method down converts the reference and test channels to make the measurements at a lower frequency. The phase may be measured with a quadrature detector. A VNA requires at least two receivers, but some will have three or four receivers to permit simultaneous measurement of different parameters.

There are some VNA architectures (six-port reflectometer) that infer phase and magnitude from just power measurements.

=== Processor and display ===
With the processed RF signal available from the receiver / detector section it is necessary to display the signal in a format that can be interpreted. With the levels of processing that are available today, some very sophisticated solutions are available in RF network analyzers. Here the reflection and transmission data is formatted to enable the information to be interpreted as easily as possible. Most RF network analyzers incorporate features including linear and logarithmic sweeps, linear and log formats, polar plots, Smith charts, etc. Trace markers, limit lines and pass/fail criteria are also added in many instances.

== S-parameter measurement with vector network analyzer ==
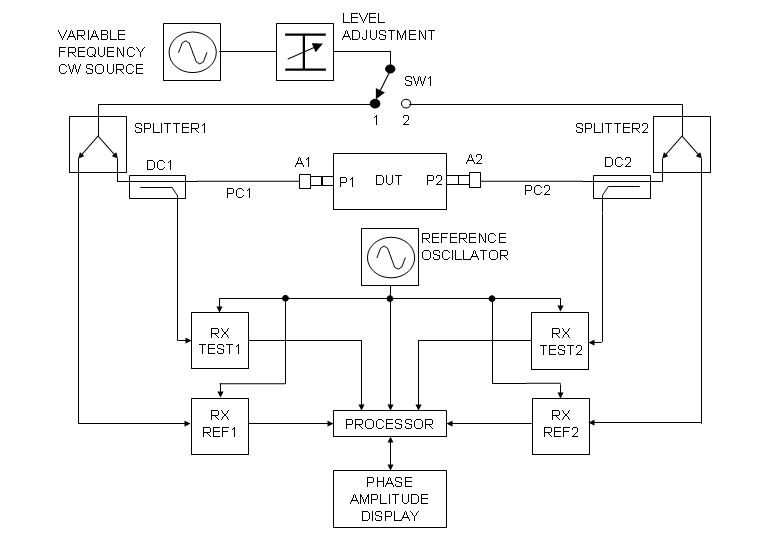
The basic parts of a vector network analyzer

A VNA is a test system that enables the RF performance of radio frequency and microwave devices to be characterised in terms of network scattering parameters, or S parameters.

The diagram shows the essential parts of a typical 2-port vector network analyzer (VNA). The two ports of the device under test (DUT) are denoted port 1 (P1) and port 2 (P2). The test port connectors provided on the VNA itself are precision types which will normally have to be extended and connected to P1 and P2 using precision cables 1 and 2, PC1 and PC2 respectively and suitable connector adaptors A1 and A2 respectively.

The test frequency is generated by a variable frequency CW source and its power level is set using a variable attenuator. The position of switch SW1 sets the direction that the test signal passes through the DUT. Initially consider that SW1 is at position 1 so that the test signal is incident on the DUT at P1 which is appropriate for measuring $S_{11}\,$ and $S_{21}\,$. The test signal is fed by SW1 to the common port of splitter 1, one arm (the reference channel) feeding a reference receiver for P1 (RX REF1) and the other (the test channel) connecting to P1 via the directional coupler DC1, PC1 and A1. The third port of DC1 couples off the power reflected from P1 via A1 and PC1, then feeding it to test receiver 1 (RX TEST1). Similarly, signals leaving P2 pass via A2, PC2 and DC2 to RX TEST2. RX REF1, RX TEST1, RX REF2 and RXTEST2 are known as coherent receivers as they share the same reference oscillator, and they are capable of measuring the test signal's amplitude and phase at the test frequency. All of the complex receiver output signals are fed to a processor which does the mathematical processing and displays the chosen parameters and format on the phase and amplitude display. The instantaneous value of phase includes both the temporal and spatial parts, but the former is removed by virtue of using 2 test channels, one as a reference and the other for measurement. When SW1 is set to position 2, the test signals are applied to P2, the reference is measured by RX REF2, reflections from P2 are coupled off by DC2 and measured by RX TEST2 and signals leaving P1 are coupled off by DC1 and measured by RX TEST1. This position is appropriate for measuring $S_{22}\,$ and $S_{12}\,$.

== Calibration and error correction ==
A network analyzer, like most electronic instruments requires periodic calibration; typically this is performed once per year and is performed by the manufacturer or by a 3rd party in a calibration laboratory. When the instrument is calibrated, a sticker will usually be attached, stating the date it was calibrated and when the next calibration is due. A calibration certificate will be issued.

A vector network analyzer achieves highly accurate measurements by correcting for the systematic errors in the instrument, the characteristics of cables, adapters and test fixtures. The process of error correction, although commonly just called calibration, is an entirely different process, and may be performed by an engineer several times in an hour. Sometimes it is called user-calibration, to indicate the difference from periodic calibration by a manufacturer.

A network analyzer has connectors on its front panel, but the measurements are seldom made at the front panel. Usually some test cables will connect from the front panel to the device under test (DUT). The length of those cables will introduce a time delay and corresponding phase shift (affecting VNA measurements); the cables will also introduce some attenuation (affecting SNA and VNA measurements). The same is true for cables and couplers inside the network analyzer. All these factors will change with temperature. Calibration usually involves measuring known standards and using those measurements to compensate for systematic errors, but there are methods which do not require known standards. Only systematic errors can be corrected. Random errors, such as connector repeatability cannot be corrected by the user calibration. However, some portable vector network analyzers, designed for lower accuracy measurement outside using batteries, do attempt some correction for temperature by measuring the internal temperature of the network analyzer.

The first steps, prior to starting the user calibration are:

- Visually inspect the connectors for any problems such as bent pins or parts which are obviously off-centre. These should not be used, as mating damaged connectors with good connectors will often result in damaging the good connector.
- Clean the connectors with compressed air at less than 60 psi.
- If necessary clean the connectors with isopropyl alcohol and allow to dry.
- Gage the connectors to determine there are not any gross mechanical problems. Connector gauges with resolutions of 0.001" to 0.0001" will usually be included in the better quality calibration kits.
- Tighten the connectors to the specified torque. A torque wrench will be supplied with all but the cheapest calibration kits.

There are several different methods of calibration.

- SOLT : which is an acronym for short, open, load, through, is the simplest method. As the name suggests, this requires access to known standards with a short circuit, open circuit, a precision load (usually 50 ohms) and a through connection. It is best if the test ports have the same type of connector (N, 3,5 mm etc.), but of a different gender, so the through just requires the test ports are connected together. SOLT is suitable for coaxial measurements, where it is possible to obtain the short, open, load and through. The SOLT calibration method is less suitable for waveguide measurements, where it is difficult to obtain an open circuit or a load, or for measurements on non-coaxial test fixtures, where the same problems with finding suitable standards exist.
- TRL (through-reflect-line calibration): This technique is useful for microwave, noncoaxial environments such as fixture, wafer probing, or waveguide. TRL uses a transmission line, significantly longer in electrical length than the through line, of known length and impedance as one standard. TRL also requires a high-reflection standard (usually, a short or open) whose impedance does not have to be well characterized, but it must be electrically the same for both test ports. Sometimes manufactures, such as Anritsu, call the TRL calibration a LRL calibration where the first L now stands for 'Line'.

The simplest calibration that can be performed on a network analyzer is a transmission measurement. This gives no phase information, and so gives similar data to a scalar network analyzer. The simplest calibration that can be performed on a network analyzer, whilst providing phase information is a 1-port calibration (S11 or S22, but not both). This accounts for the three systematic errors which appear in 1-port reflectivity measurements:

- Directivity—error resulting from the portion of the source signal that never reaches the DUT.
- Source match—errors resulting from multiple internal reflections between the source and the DUT.
- Reflection tracking—error resulting from all frequency dependence of test leads, connections, etc.

In a typical 1-port reflection calibration, the user measures three known standards, usually an open, a short and a known load. From these three measurements the network analyzer can account for the three errors above.

A more complex calibration is a full 2-port reflectivity and transmission calibration. For two ports there are 12 possible systematic errors analogous to the three above. The most common method for correcting for these involves measuring a short, load and open standard on each of the two ports, as well as transmission between the two ports.

It is impossible to make a perfect short circuit, as there will always be some inductance in the short. It is impossible to make a perfect open circuit, as there will always be some fringing capacitance. A modern network analyzer will have data stored about the devices in a calibration kit. (Keysight Technologies 2006) For the open-circuit, this will be some electrical delay (typically tens of picoseconds), and fringing capacitance which will be frequency dependent. The capacitance is normally specified in terms of a polynomial, with the coefficients specific to each standard. A short will have some delay, and a frequency dependent inductance, although the inductance is normally considered insignificant below about 6 GHz. The definitions for a number of standards used in Keysight calibration kits can be found at http://na.support.keysight.com/pna/caldefs/stddefs.html The definitions of the standards for a particular calibration kit will often change depending on the frequency range of the network analyzer. If a calibration kit works to 9 GHz, but a particular network analyzer has a maximum frequency of operation of 3 GHz, then the capacitance of the open standard can approximated more closely up to 3 GHz, using a different set of coefficients than are necessary to work up to 9 GHz.

In some calibration kits, the data on the males is different from the females, so the user needs to specify the gender of the connector. In other calibration kits (e.g. Keysight 85033E 9 GHz 3.5 mm), the male and female have identical characteristics, so there is no need for the user to specify the gender. For gender-less connectors, like APC-7, this issue does not arise.

Most network analyzers have the ability to have a user defined calibration kit. So if a user has a particular calibration kit details of which are not in the firmware of the network analyzer, the data about the kit can be loaded into the network analyzer and so the kit used. Typically the calibration data can be entered on the instrument front panel or loaded from a medium such as floppy disk or USB stick, or down a bus such as USB or GPIB.

The more expensive calibration kits will usually include a torque wrench to tighten connectors properly and a connector gauge to ensure there are no gross errors in the connectors.

=== Automated calibration fixtures ===
A calibration using a mechanical calibration kit may take a significant amount of time. Not only must the operator sweep through all the frequencies of interest, but the operator must also disconnect and reconnect the various standards. (Keysight Technologies 2003, p. 9) To avoid that work, network analyzers can employ automated calibration standards. (Keysight Technologies 2003) The operator connects one box to the network analyzer. The box has a set of standards inside and some switches that have already been characterized. The network analyzer can read the characterization and control the configuration using a digital bus such as USB.

== Network analyzer verification kits ==
Many verification kits are available to verify the network analyzer is performing to specification. These typically consist of transmission lines with an air dielectric and attenuators. The Keysight 85055A verification kit includes a 10 cm airline, stepped impedance airline, 20 dB and 50 dB attenuators with data on the devices measured by the manufacturer and stored on both a floppy disk and USB flash drive. Older versions of the 85055A have the data stored on tape and floppy disks rather than on USB drives. Verification kits are also manufactured for other transmission lines such as waveguide which contain a known through mismatch and attenuations. The Flann verification kit includes 5 mismatches using a decrease in waveguide height to provide a known VSWR and 2 attenuators of differing attenuation levels.

== Noise figure measurements ==
The three major manufacturers of VNAs, Keysight, Anritsu, and Rohde & Schwarz, all produce models which extend the functionality of their products to also include measurement of noise figure. The vector error correction permits higher accuracy than is possible with other forms of commercial noise figure meters.

== See also ==
- Bode plotter
- Electrical measurements
- Network analyzer (AC power)
- Vector signal analyzer
- Smith chart
