= Type 041 submarine =

Chinese attack submarine class

Class overview
- Name: Type 041
- Builders: Wuchang Shipbuilding, Wuhan, China
- Operators: People's Liberation Army Navy
- Preceded by: Type 039A/B/C
- Built: 2021–present
- Building: 1
- Completed: 0

General characteristics
- Type: Attack submarine
- Displacement: 4,000 t (submerged)"
- Length: 84 m (275 ft 7 in) (estimated)
- Beam: 8.5 m (27 ft 11 in) (estimated)
- Propulsion: Unknown. Possible Hybrid Conventional/nuclear

The Type 041 (Note: Throughout the 2010s, the designation "Type 041" was incorrectly attributed to improved variants of the Type 039A. Unnamed sources at the U.S. Department of Defense claimed in September 2024 that the actual Type 041 is a wholly new class beginning with the submarine which sank in Spring 2024.) (NATO reporting name: Zhou class) is a class of attack submarines under development by China for the People's Liberation Army Navy Submarine Force (PLANSF).

The class is expected to succeed the Type 039A/B/C and would break convention as the first nuclear submarines to be built by Wuchang Shipbuilding along the Yangtze in the central China city of Wuhan, if claims of it being Nuclear powered are correct. The class would also be the first hybrid conventional/nuclear Chinese design, and the first to feature a distinctive X-shaped stern configuration. Naval analysts describe it as a considerable advancement in Chinese sonar sensor technology and stealth acoustic signature reductions.

== Design ==
The third-generation Type 041 submarine was first identified in satellite images in May 2021 and subsequently unveiled by the People's Liberation Army Navy (PLAN) in July 2022. Unnamed Pentagon officials speaking to The Washington Times claim the boat is "a new class of nuclear submarine that is similar in size to the PLAN's conventionally powered submarines, but with a small nuclear reactor."

=== Hull ===
The vessel's design reportedly represents a new level in stealth technology for a Chinese submarine, making it harder to detect with sonar. A satellite image taken in March 2024 by Maxar Technologies revealed that the submarine was designed with an X-shaped stern, a design which improves maneuverability, efficiency, and safety, and also helps reduce the acoustic signature across significant parts of the submarine's operating envelope. Naval analyst Thomas Shugart calls the design a "major upgrade from the Type 039A Yuan-class", his analysis of satellite imagery suggests the new submarine is around 10% longer than earlier generation attack submarines.

The class is being built by Wuhan's Wuchang Shipbuilding, a subsidiary of state-owned China State Shipbuilding Corporation.

=== Propulsion ===
Chinese military affairs analyst Rick Fisher believes that based on descriptions of planned propulsion systems given by PLAN Rear Admiral Zhao Dengping in 2017, the nuclear power plant is similar to the Soviet designed VAU-6 auxiliary nuclear power plant (ANPP) tested in the late 1980s on the Juliett-class submarine K-68. Sébastien Roblin wrote in Popular Mechanics that an ANPP design may be getting tested in the Type 041 as a way to cost effectively to increase range and submersion time on new boats and potentially replace the AIP systems on older existing Type 039 boats.

Most western analysts, including unofficial statements by officials from the U.S. Department of Defense, believe that the submarine is nuclear powered, however national security futurist and author P. W. Singer and Michael Dahm, Senior Resident Fellow for Aerospace and China Studies at George Washington University, dispute the claim, instead arguing for a translation error of Chinese reports which they say actually references air-independent propulsion (AIP) technology, the conventional propulsion technology used on existing Type 039A/B/C submarines already in service.

=== Combat control systems ===
According to Thomas Shugart, satellite imagery suggests the Type 041 will be equipped to be able to deploy dual towed sonar arrays.

As the newest and most capable generation of attack submarine in the Chinese fleet, some speculate it may be used to escort Chinese carrier groups in the future.

=== Armament ===
According to P. W. Singer and Michael Dahm, the submarine's extended hull includes a section that appears to contain a vertical launching system (VLS) which they say would likely accommodate long-range YJ-18 anti-ship missiles or CJ-10 land-attack missiles.

== Boats ==
Name	Hull no.	Builder	Laid down	Launched	Commissioned	Status
Type 041
Unknown	Unknown	Wuchang Shipbuilding, Wuhan	2021	2023	Not in commission	Under construction

== Incidents ==
=== 2024 alleged sinking in the Yangtze ===
In late May or early June 2024, the first Type 041 allegedly sank alongside its pier in the Yangtze River during fitting out at Wuchang Shipbuilding.

Thomas Shugart, senior fellow at the Center for a New American Security, was the first to publicly identify the incident, writing on social media site X in June regarding satellite photos of the Wuchang shipyard showing what he described as a large number of floating cranes salvaging a submerged submarine-shaped object from the river bottom. Few details emerged until September 26 when U.S. defense officials confirmed to The Wall Street Journal that a Chinese submarine had sunken pier-side.

US officials claimed that while the submarine had definitively sunk, they could not ascertain whether the submarine's alleged reactor was fueled at the time of incident, "or if it is going to be relocated to a known nuclear-certified facility for its initial fueling, such as Huludao shipyard, which has built all previous PLAN nuclear submarine classes," the official said. No radiation leak has been detected.

A spokesperson from the Chinese embassy in Washington, DC denied any knowledge of the incident to CNN, saying "We are not familiar with the situation you mentioned and currently have no information to provide." A Chinese Foreign Ministry spokesperson subsequently issued a similar denial to the BBC at a news conference in Beijing.
