= Six-port reflectometer =

Type of network analyzer

Six-port reflectometers are a type of network analyzer based on passive multiport junctions and power detection. The six-port principle determines a complex reflection coefficient from multiple power measurements and does not rely on frequency conversion or direct phase detection.

The six-port measurement principle was developed in the early history of microwave metrology as a general method for extracting amplitude and phase information of network response from power measurements, and was later formalized and extensively studied by G. F. Engen and colleagues in the 1970s at the National Bureau of Standards (now NIST). Six-port reflectometers are limited by their complex calibration techniques, but increasing processing power is addressing the computational intensity of this task.

== Operating principle ==
The core of a six-port reflectometer is a passive linear network with six ports. One port is connected to a signal source, and one port is connected to a device under test (DUT). The remaining four ports are connected to power detectors. Each detector receives a different linear combination of the incident signal from the source and the signal reflected from the DUT. In a properly designed six-port, these combinations correspond to different relative phase relationships. By measuring the resulting power values, the complex reflection coefficient of the DUT can be determined.

== Advantages ==
An advantage of the six-port reflectometer is its simple structure. Heterodyne network analyzers require high-quality components for frequency conversion and phase-sensitive detection, whereas a six-port reflectometer consists of a passive linear circuit and a few power detectors. This makes it, in principle, much cheaper than traditional network analyzers.

Another advantage in metrology applications is measurement redundancy: the reflection coefficient is determined from relative power measurements at multiple detector ports, so the additional measurements provide internal consistency checks that can be used to estimate measurement uncertainty.

Six-port reflectometers are also well-suited for measuring circuit behavior under high signal power. Since they rely on power detection rather than direct phase measurement, the associated detection circuits are easier to design.

== Disadvantages ==
Commercial adoption of six-port reflectometers has been limited, and they are primarily used in specialized research and metrology applications.

Several reasons explain this:

- Until recently, it was difficult to develop a six-port reflectometer with bandwidth comparable to traditional network analyzers.
- The calibration procedure is often more time-consuming than that of traditional analyzers.
- As a power-detection-based measurement technique without frequency selectivity, six-port reflectometers face challenges when measuring insertion loss in certain devices, such as band-stop filters. Unlike heterodyne network analyzers, signal harmonics are not suppressed, leading to reduced dynamic range.

For users only interested in measuring reflection coefficient amplitude (not phase), simpler and cheaper alternatives often suffice.
