= YJ-82 =

Chinese anti-ship cruise missile

- Type: Anti-ship cruise missile
- Place of origin: People's Republic of China

Service history
- In service: 1998
- Used by: People's Republic of China

Production history
- Manufacturer: China Aerospace Science and Industry Corporation

Specifications
- Mass: 682 kg (1,504 lb)
- Length: 6.8 m (22 ft)
- Diameter: 360 mm (14 in)
- Warhead: 165 kg (364 lb) high-explosive fragmenting warhead 165 kg (364 lb) armor-piercing warhead
- Operational range: 42 km (26 mi; 23 nmi); 180 km (110 mi; 97 nmi) (YJ-82/C-802A); 128 km (80 mi; 69 nmi) (CM-708UNA); 290 km (180 mi; 160 nmi) (CM-708UNB)
- Flight altitude: 20–30 m (66–98 ft) (cruise); 7 m (23 ft) (terminal)
- Maximum speed: Mach 0.9
- Guidance system: Inertial navigation/active radar homing terminal guidance
- Launch platform: Submarine

The YJ-82 (Chinese: 鹰击-82; pinyin: yingji-82; lit. 'eagle strike 82') is a Chinese subsonic anti-ship cruise missile. NATO reporting name: CH-SS-N-7 It is manufactured by the China Aerospace Science and Industry Corporation Third Academy.

The YJ-82 is the submarine-launched version of the YJ-8 missile family.

== Description ==
The YJ-82 is a solid-fuelled rocket. It is launched from submarines from a buoyant launch canister. The YJ-82 lacks the solid-rocket booster of the surface-launched YJ-8/8A and likely has less range than the latter's 42 km. The terminal sea-skimming attack altitude is 5 to 7 meters.

The launch capsule is a copy of the one used by submarine-launched Harpoons; China likely received the technology from Pakistan, which had such weapons.

== Development ==
In the fall of 1983, the People's Liberation Army Navy (PLAN) test fired YJ-8 missiles from a modified Type 033 submarine; the submarine had to surface to fire, and six missiles could be fired in six to seven minutes. The missile's short range and surface launch left the submarine vulnerable. The YJ-82 was developed by placing the missile inside a buoyant launch capsule; the capsule technology was acquired from Pakistan.

The YJ-82 was first test fired from a Type 039 submarine in 1997; initial tests did not go well. The first photographs of the missile appeared at the 2004 China International Aviation & Aerospace Exhibition.

The YJ-82 was often erroneously referred to in the West as C-801Q or YJ-8Q, implying an export version of YJ-82. However, the destination does not exist.

== Variants and derivatives ==
- YJ-82
- CM-708UNA - YJ-82 derivative, 128 km range
- CM-708UNB - YJ-82 or YJ-83 derivative, 290 km range

== Operators ==
=== Current operators ===
China

- People's Liberation Army Navy
