= Olympics-class submarine =

Class of Chinese submarine

Class overview
- Name: Olympics class
- Operators: People's Liberation Army Navy

General characteristics
- Type: Submarine
- Length: Estimated 40 to 50 m (131 ft 3 in to 164 ft 1 in)

The Olympics class is a class of Chinese submarines. The first submarine was visible on a video February 8 2022 on Chinese social media. The official name of the class is not known, but the nickname Olympics class refers to that the video become public during the time for 2022 Winter Olympics in Beijing. The submarine was filmed on Yangtze River downstream from Wuhan, where two submarine shipyards are located.

The length of the submarine is estimated in the range 40 to 50 m (131 ft 3 in to 164 ft 1 in). Some analysts believe that it may be a version of the Yuan-class conventional attack submarine and dub it Type 039-C/D. It has a very unusual-looking sail.
