= YJ-83 =

Chinese anti-ship cruise missile

YJ-83 / C-802
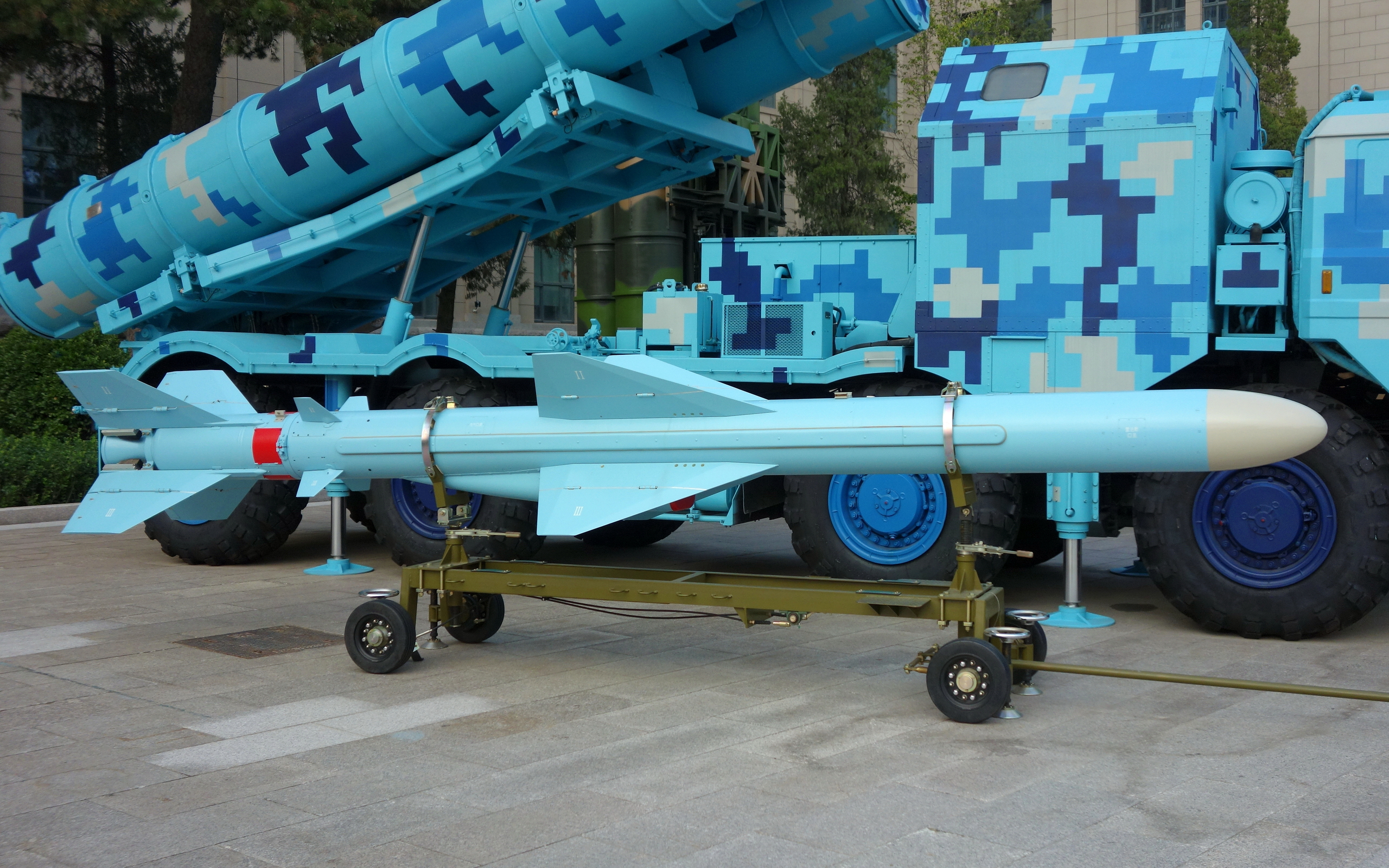
- YJ-83J Missile
- Type: Anti-ship cruise missile
- Place of origin: China

Service history
- In service: 1998–present
- Used by: People's Liberation Army Navy

Production history
- Manufacturer: China Aerospace Science and Industry Corporation

Specifications
- Mass: 800 kilograms (1,800 lb)
- Length: 6.38 metres (20.9 ft)
- Diameter: 360 millimetres (14 in)
- Wingspan: 1,220 millimetres (48 in)
- Warhead: 190 kg high-explosive fragmentation (YJ-83); 165 kg high-explosive, semi-armour piercing (YJ-83K)
- Engine: CTJ-2 turbojet
- Operational range: 180 km (YJ-83, YJ-83K); 230 km (YJ-83KH); 120 km (C-802); 180 km (C-802A)
- Flight altitude: 20-30 m (cruise); 5-7 m (terminal)
- Maximum speed: Mach 0.9 (cruise); Mach 1.4 (terminal)
- Guidance system: Inertial navigation/active radar homing or imaging-infrared (IIR) terminal guidance
- Launch platform: Surface and air launched

The YJ-83 (Chinese: 鹰击-83; pinyin: yingji-83; lit. 'eagle strike 83'; NATO reporting name: CSS-N-8 Saccade) is a Chinese subsonic anti-ship cruise missile. It is manufactured by the China Aerospace Science and Industry Corporation Third Academy.

== Development ==
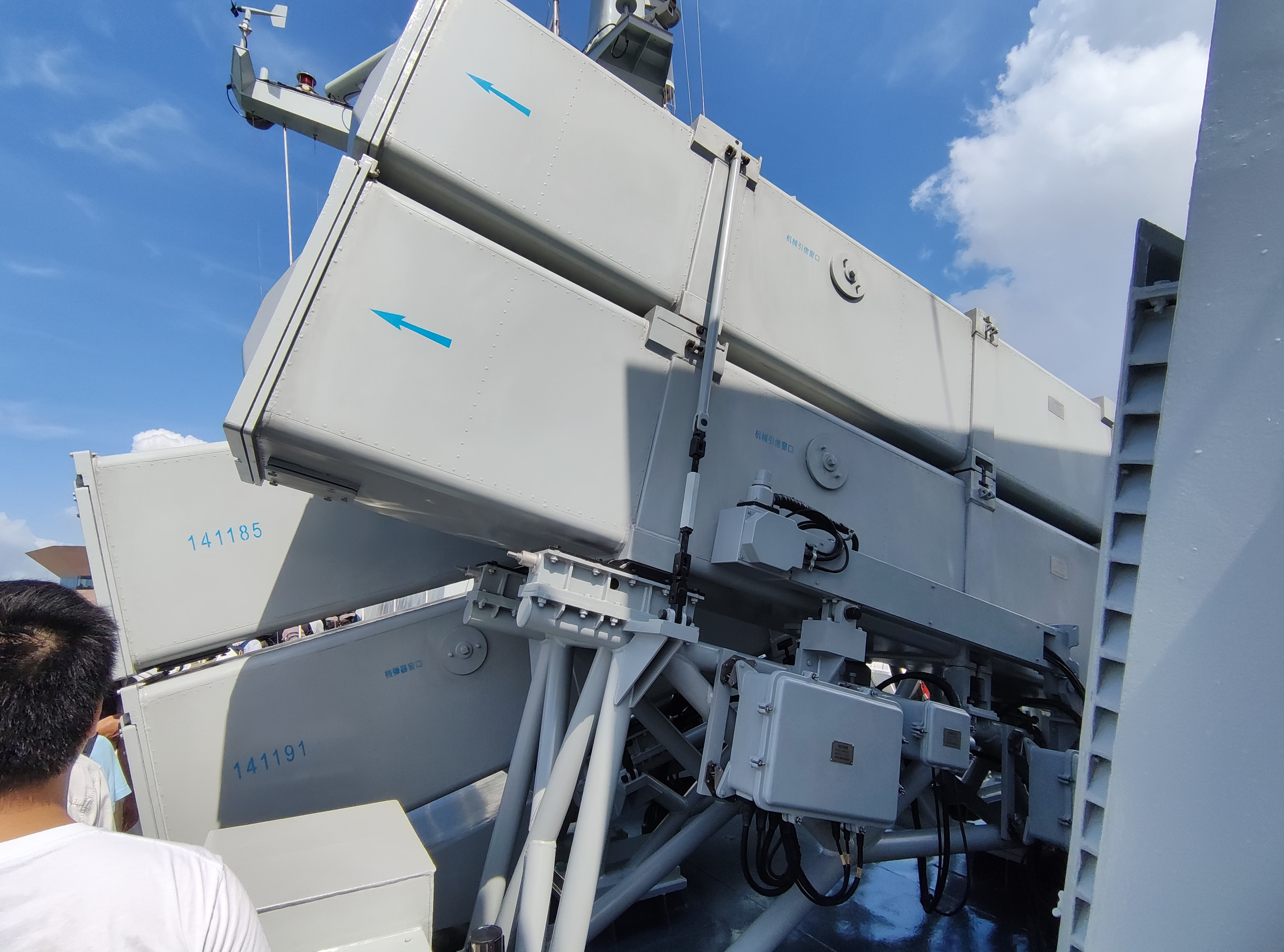
Surface-launched YJ-83 missiles on a Type 056 corvette

The YJ-83 uses microprocessors and a strap-down inertial reference unit (IRU); these are more compact than the equivalent electronics used in the YJ-8 and the export C-802, allowing the YJ-83 to have a 180-km range at Mach 0.9. The missile is powered by the Chinese CTJ-2 turbojet and is fitted with a 190-kg high-explosive fragmentation warhead. Terminal guidance is by an active radar.

The air-launched YJ-83K has a range of 180 km (110 mi), a cruise speed of Mach 0.9, and a 165 kg (364 lb) high-explosive, semi-armour piercing warhead. The improved YJ-83KH uses an imaging-infrared seeker and has a range of 230 km; reportedly it may receive course corrections by remote link.

The YJ-83 entered service with the People's Liberation Army Navy in 1998 and 1999, equipping large numbers of its surface warships. The YJ-83K is the standard anti-ship missile carried by the People's Liberation Army Naval Air Force; the United States reported the usage in 2014. The People's Liberation Army Air Force was using the YJ-83K by February 2020.

=== C-802A ===
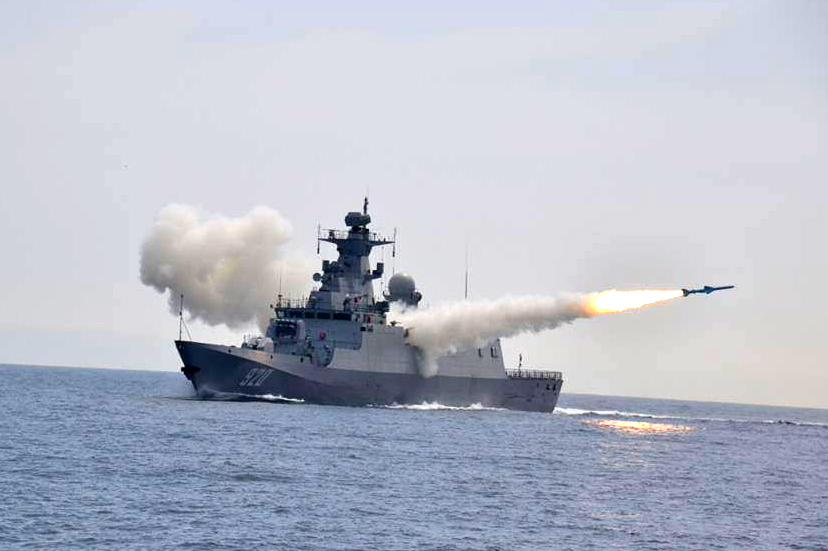
C-802

The C-802 precedes the closely related YJ-83. It is powered by the French TRI 60-2 turbojet and has a range of 65 nautical miles (120 km). The C-802 is considered a part of the YJ-83 family by the US military. The C-802 was likely an export-only design. From the 1990s, it was erroneously reported that it was used by China as the "YJ-2". It is not an export version of the YJ-82; the two are separate developments.

The C-802A and C-802AK are the export surface- and air-launched variants. The C-802A has a range of 97 nautical miles (180 km).

Western reporting has erroneously attributed the "C-803" designation to the YJ-83. The "C-803" designation was not used in Chinese promotional information through 2012.

== Operational history ==
On 14 July 2006, during the 2006 Lebanon War, Hezbollah fired two Chinese-built C-802 missiles with upgraded Iranian radar seekers. The first hit a Cambodian-flagged Egyptian freighter 60 km offshore. The other hit the Israeli Navy's Sa'ar 5-class corvette INS Hanit, which was patrolling 8.5 nm offshore of Beirut. The missile hit the corvette's less stealthy crane near the rear helicopter pad; the explosion holed the pad, set fire to fuel storage, and killed four crewmembers. The fire was extinguished after four hours, and Hanit returned to Ashdod under its own power for three weeks of repairs. The corvette's automatic anti-missile systems were deactivated before the attack; Israel was unaware that Hezbollah had C-802s, and there were concerns over friendly fire with the Israeli Air Force.

In October 2016, a cruise missile launched by Houthis in Yemen damaged HSV-2 Swift, an unarmed transport ship under the control of the United Arab Emirates (who is opposed to the Houthis in Yemen's civil war). Analysis of the damage caused by the missile led experts to believe it was a C-802, as the missile had an explosively formed penetrator (EFP) warhead.

== Variants ==
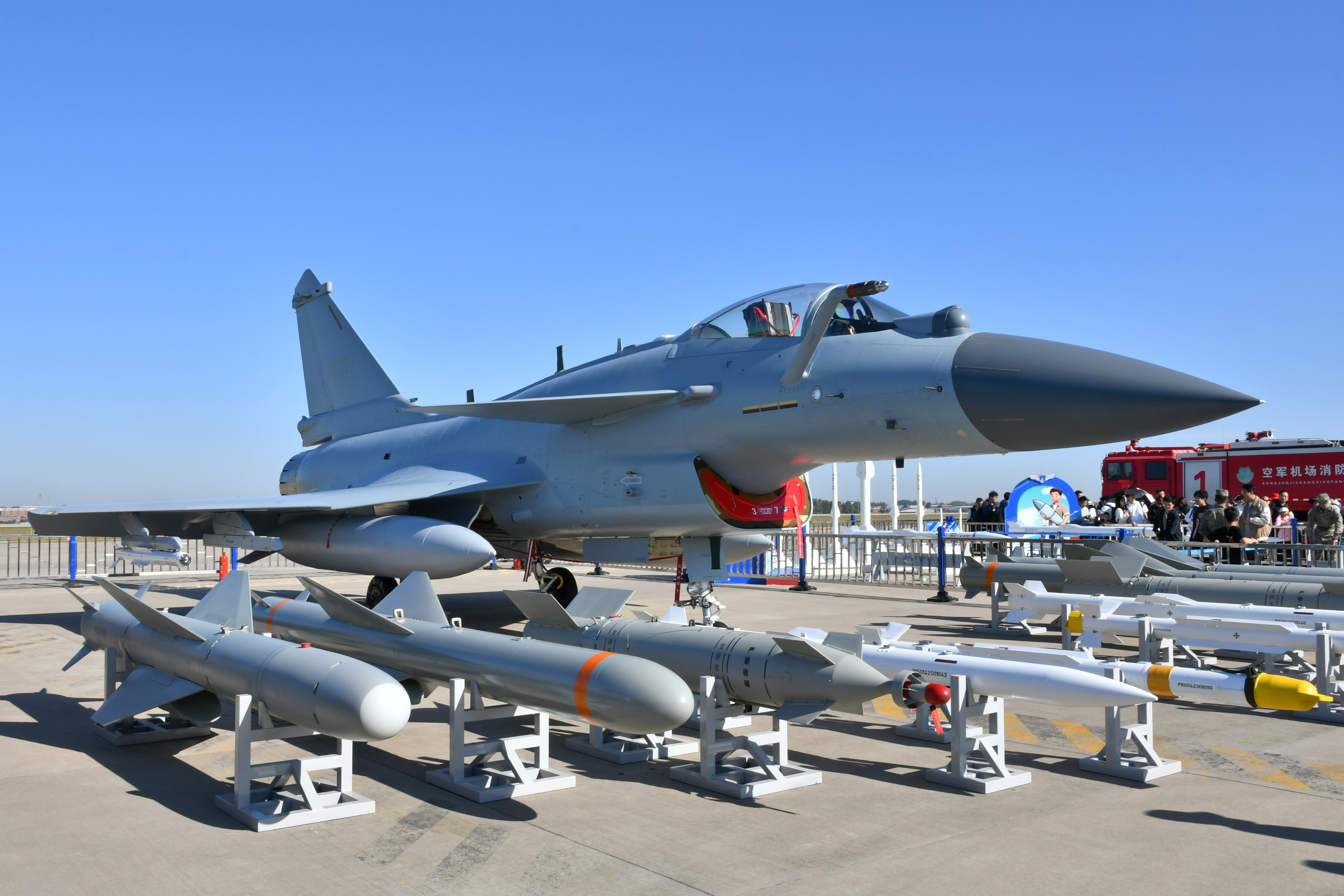
YJ-83K missile (at bottom; second from left)

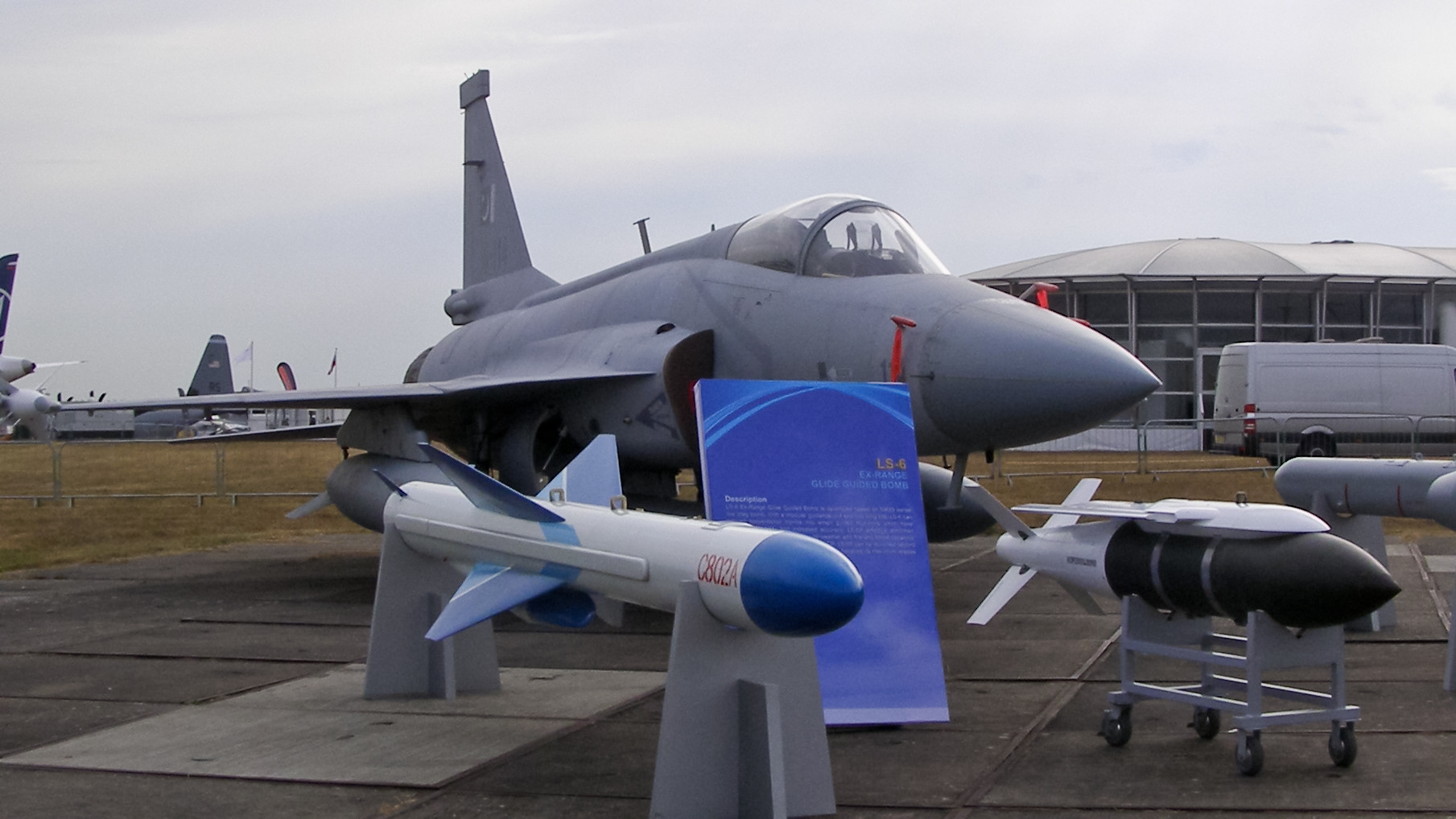
C-802A air launched variant (middle)

YJ-83
Initial surface-launched version with 120 km range.

YJ-83A/YJ-83J
Variant with enhanced range; 180 km for surface-launch and 250 km for air-launch.

YJ-83K
Air-launched variant with 180 km range.

YJ-83KH
Air-launched variant with imaging-infrared (IIR) seeker and 230 km (140 mi; 120 nmi).

C-802
Predecessor of the YJ-83.

C-802A
Export variant of the surface-launched YJ-83.

C-802AK
Export version of the air-launched YJ-83K.

KD-88
Further development. KD-88 is an air-launched cruise missile derived from YJ-83 missile.

CM-802AKG
Export version of KD-88. Based on the air-launched YJ-83 with a television (TV) or imaging-infrared (IIR) seeker and a redesigned airframe with more fuel.

== Operators ==
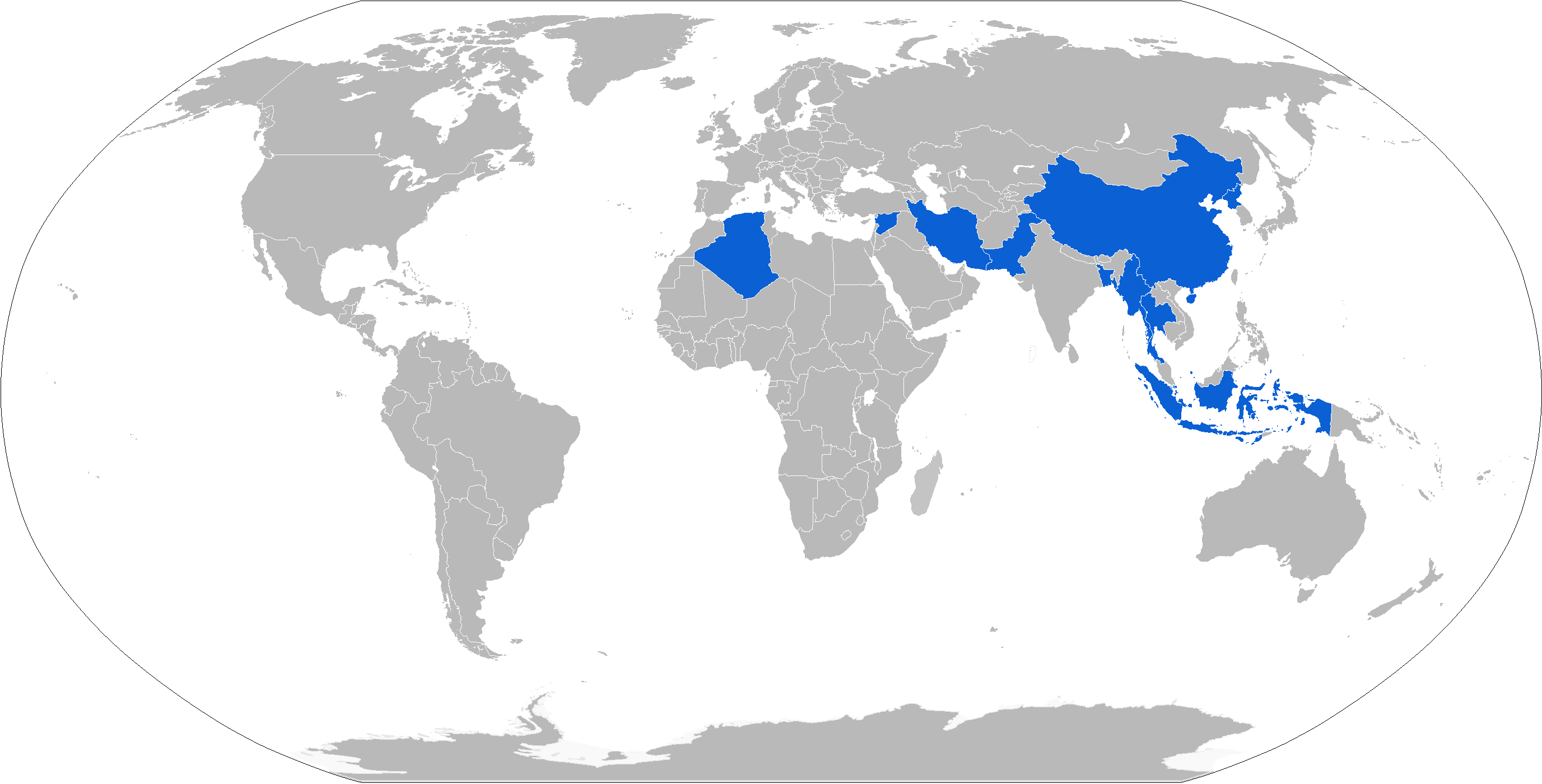
Map with YJ-83 operators in blue

Algeria

- Algerian National Navy: C-802, C-802A

Bangladesh

- Bangladesh Navy: C-802, C-802A

China

- People's Liberation Army Air Force
- People's Liberation Army Navy
- People's Liberation Army Naval Air Force

Hezbollah
Indonesia

- Indonesian Navy: C-802

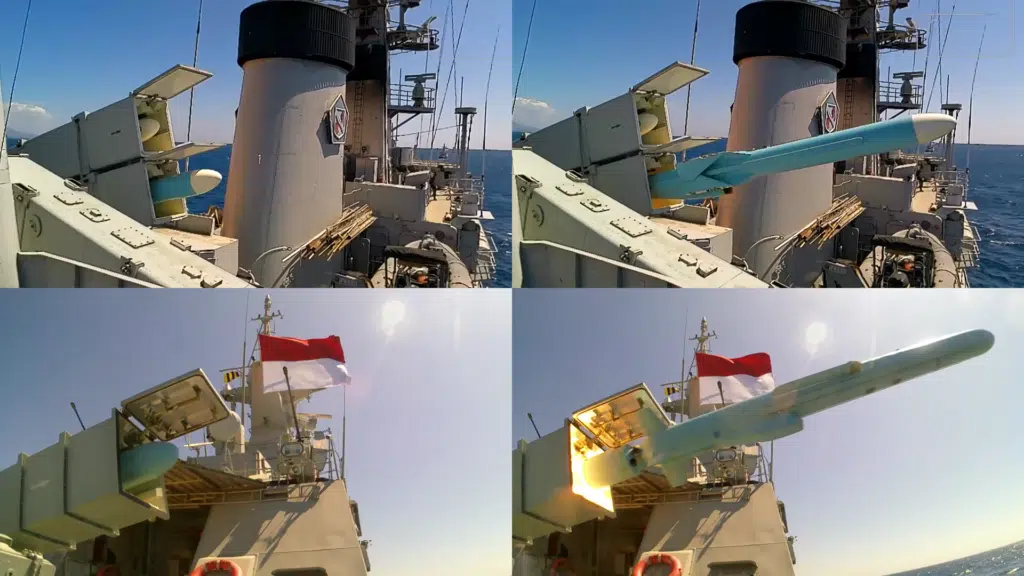
C-802 (top) and C-705 (bottom) missile launches against target ship KRI Slamet Riyadi.

Iran

- Islamic Republic of Iran Navy: C-802 and an Iranian copy called Noor

Myanmar

- Myanmar Navy: C-802
- Myanmar Air Force: C-802A

Pakistan

- Pakistan Air Force: C-802AK
- Pakistan Navy: C-802, C-802A

Syria

- Syrian Arab Navy: C-802

Thailand

- Royal Thai Navy: C-802A

Yemen

- Yemeni Navy: C-802

Venezuela

- Bolivarian Navy of Venezuela: C-802A on Guaiquerí-class boats and fast attack craft

== See also ==
- Noor and Ghader, derivative of the C-802 produced by Iran
- Exocet – (France)
- Harpoon – (United States)
- Kh-35 – (Russia)
- NASM-MR – (India)
- Otomat – (Italy, France)
- RBS 15 – (Sweden)
- R-360 Neptune – (Ukraine)
