= Anritsu =

Japanese telecommunications equipment corporation

Anritsu Corporation

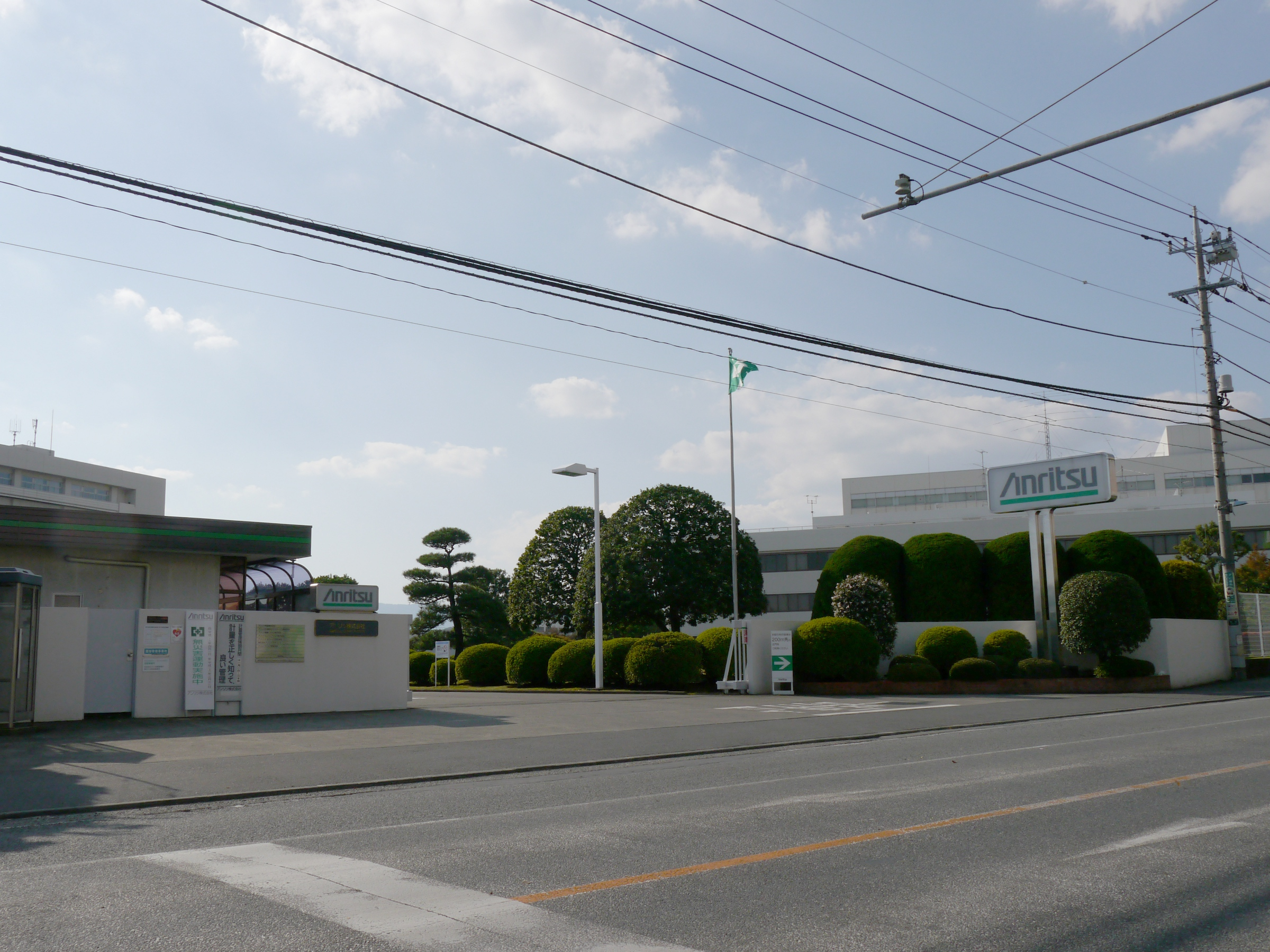
- Native name: アンリツ株式会社
- Type: Public KK
- Traded as: TYO: 6754
- ISIN: JP3128800004
- Industry: Electronics
- Founded: 1895; 131 years ago as Sekisan-sha
- Headquarters: Atsugi, Kanagawa Prefecture, 243-8555, Japan
- Area served: Worldwide
- Key people: Hirokazu Hashimoto (Chairman and CEO); Hirokazu Hamada (President)
- Products: Measuring instruments; Microwave, RF & optical products; OTDRs; Weighing machines; Service Assurance; Metal detectors; X-ray inspection systems
- Revenue: ▼JPY 85.9 billion (FY 2017) (US$ 809 million) (FY 2017)
- Net income: ▲JPY 2.8 billion (FY 2017) (US$ 27 million) (FY 2017)
- Number of employees: 3,717 (consolidated, as of March 31, 2018)
- Website: anritsu.com

Anritsu Corporation (アンリツ株式会社, Anritsu Kabushiki-gaisha) is a Japanese multinational corporation in the telecommunications electronics equipment market. A global pioneer for producing the world's first wireless telephone network, Anritsu's revenue numbers near US$782 million.

== History ==
In Japan, Anritsu's first predecessor, Sekisan-sha, was founded in 1895. Annaka Electric Company followed, producing wireless transmitters and the world's first wireless telephone service and Japan's first automatic public telephone.

Anritsu Corporation was formed with the merger of two companies, the Annaka Corporation and Kyoritsu Electric in Japan in 1931. In 1990, Anritsu acquired Wiltron Company in the United States for $180 million.

Currently, the Anritsu Group is composed of Anritsu Corporation, Anritsu Engineering, Anritsu Infivis, Anritsu Devices, and Anritsu Networks. Anritsu Corporation's American subsidiary, Anritsu Company, is a supplier of the United States Department of Defense.

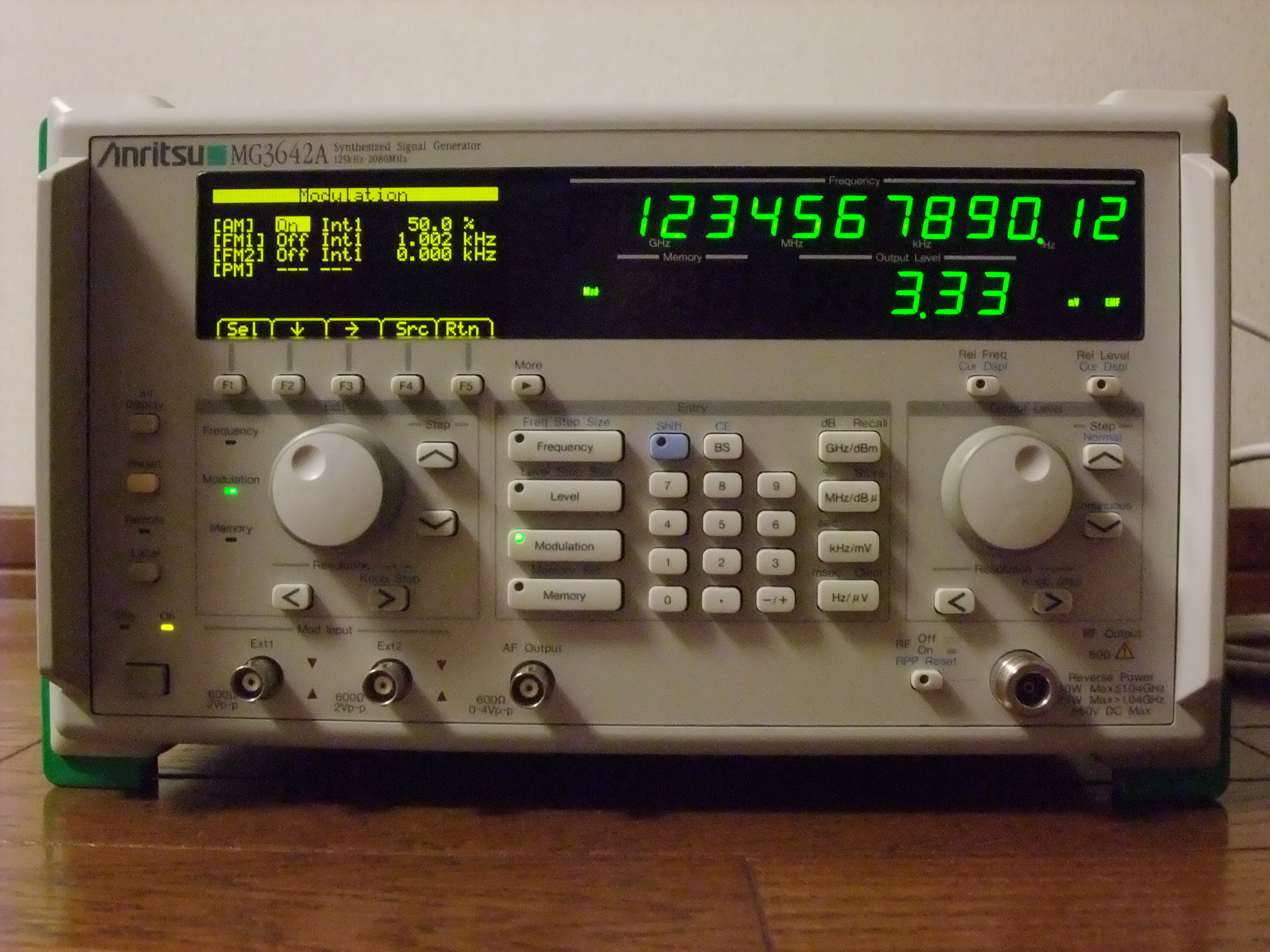
Anritsu MG3642A Synthesized Signal Generator

== Performance ==
Net sales in FY2008 were ¥84 billion (US$782 million). It has been listed on the Tokyo Stock Exchange since 1968.

== Products ==
Products include network call trace, service assurance, customer experience management, microwave, radio frequency (RF), and optical signal generators, spectrum analyzers, and network analyzers.
