= YJ-8 =

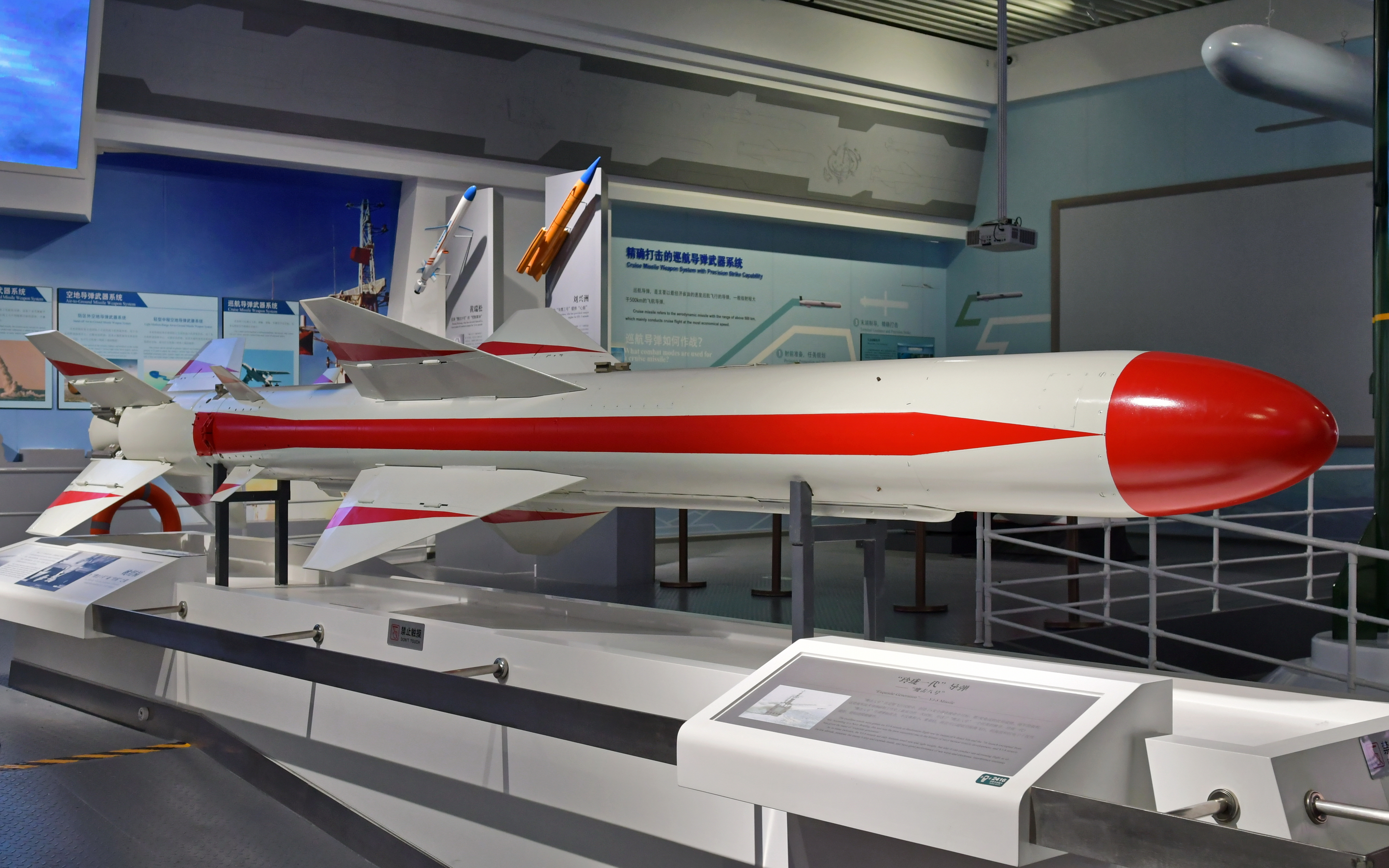
- YJ-8A Missile
- Type: Anti-ship missiles
- Place of origin: China

Service history
- In service: early 1990s to present
- Used by: China
- Wars: Yemeni Civil War (2015–present); Saudi Arabian-led intervention in Yemen

Production history
- Manufacturer: China Aerospace Science and Industry Corporation
- Unit cost: US$ 0.78 million
- Produced: Late 1980s to present (export)

Specifications
- Mass: 815 kg (1,797 lb)
- Length: 5.81 m (19.1 ft)
- Warhead: 165 kg (364 lb)
- Engine: Rocket motor
- Propellant: Solid fuel
- Operational range: 42 km (26 mi; 23 nmi)
- Flight altitude: 5–7 m (16–23 ft)
- Maximum speed: ≈ Mach 0.9
- Guidance system: Inertial navigation/active radar homing terminal guidance
- Launch platform: Aerial, naval and land-based

The YJ-8 (Chinese: 鹰击-8; pinyin: yingji-8; lit. 'eagle strike 8'; NATO reporting name: CSS-N-4 Sardine) is a Chinese air and surface-launched subsonic anti-ship cruise missile. It is manufactured by the China Aerospace Science and Industry Corporation (CASIC) Third Academy.

The YJ-8 was developed into air-launched (YJ-81) and submarine-launched (YJ-82) variants.

== Description ==
The YJ-8 is either based on, or is a heavily modified copy of, the MM38 Exocet; the two missiles share virtually identical operational profiles. The replication of the MM38's "revolutionary flight profile" in less than ten years and with an immature industrial base strongly suggests that China had access to proven technology.

The YJ-8 was a "radical departure" from China's first anti-ship missiles derived from the P-15 Termit. The YJ-8 carried a smaller warhead, but had the same range and speed while being significantly smaller and lighter.

== Development ==
The development of the YJ-8 was approved in late-1976 following a few years of encouraging work on solid-fuel rockets. According to a 1991 Aerospace China article, development of the missile's engine began in 1978, and flight testing was completed in 1985. The YJ-8 reach initial operating capability in the People's Liberation Army Navy in 1987, the same year the export version—the C-801—was announced.

CASIC received the first National Science and Technology Advancement Award for development of the YJ-8 in 1988.

=== C-801 ===
The C-801 is the export version of the YJ-8. The C-801 was not marketed after 2003.

== Operational history ==
The export version C-801 was used in Yemeni Civil War (2015–present) and Saudi Arabian-led intervention in Yemen.

== Variants ==
- YJ-8: Basic version with fixed wings
- YJ-8A: Modified YJ-8 with folding wings.
- YJ-81: Air-launched YJ-8 without the booster. Often erroneously referred as YJ-8K.
- YJ-82: Submarine-launched version.
- C-801: Export version of YJ-8.
- C-801K: Export version of the YJ-81.

== Operators ==
Iran

- Islamic Republic of Iran Air Force, C-801K

Myanmar

- Myanmar Navy, C801

China

- People's Liberation Army Navy

Thailand

- Royal Thai Navy, C-801

Yemen

- Yemeni Navy, C-801
