= Dewantara-class corvette =

Class of training corvette ships

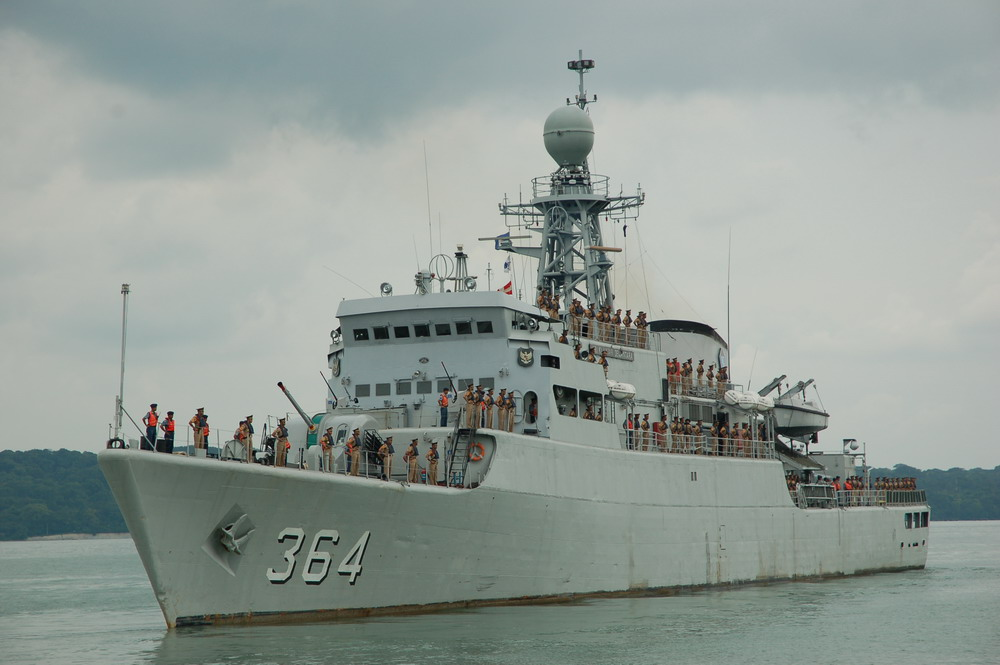
- KRI Ki Hajar Dewantara of Indonesian Navy

Class overview
- Name: Dewantara class
- Builders: Uljanik Shipyard, SFR Yugoslavia; Split Shipyard, SFR Yugoslavia
- Operators: Iraqi Navy; Indonesian Navy
- Built: 1977–1981
- In commission: 1980–2019
- Planned: 3
- Completed: 2
- Lost: 1
- Retired: 1

General characteristics
- Type: Training frigate / corvette
- Displacement: 1,850 tons full load
- Length: 96.7 m (317 ft 3 in)
- Beam: 11.2 m (36 ft 9 in)
- Draught: 3.55 m (11 ft 8 in)
- Propulsion: CODOG; 1 x Rolls-Royce Olympus TM3B gas turbine rated at 22,300 hp (16,600 kW); 2 x MTU 16V956 TB91 diesel engines rated at 7,100 hp (5,300 kW)
- Speed: 26 knots (48 km/h; 30 mph) on gas; 20 knots (37 km/h; 23 mph) on diesel
- Range: 6,400 km (4,000 mi) at 20 knots (37 km/h; 23 mph)
- Complement: 91 crew, 14 instructor, 100 cadets
- Sensors & processing systems: Raccal Decca AC1229; Signaal WM28 radar; Susie I ECM suite; Sewaco central control system; PHS-32 hull mounted MF Sonar
- Armament: Guns: 1 × Bofors 57 mm/70 gun 2 × 20 mm Rheinmetall Rh 202 Mk20 anti-air cannon; Missiles: 2 × 2 MM38 Exocet missile Mistral surface-to-air missile; Torpedoes: 2 × 533 mm (21 in) torpedo tubes for AEG SUT torpedo Depth charges
- Aircraft carried: 1 x NBO-105 or Westland Wasp helicopter

Dewantara class is a class of frigate or corvette (Note: Jane's Fighting Ships and Conway's All The World's Fighting Ships referred the class as frigate, while Indonesian Navy rated its ship as corvette.) intended as training ship that were built in SFR Yugoslavia. Three ships were planned, with each ordered by Iraqi Navy, Indonesian Navy, and Yugoslav Navy. The Yugoslav ship was never completed, while the other two were commissioned in 1980 and 1981 respectively.

== Development ==
Iraqi Ibn Khaldoum is the first ship in the class, which was laid down in 1977, launched in 1978, and commissioned on 20 March 1980. The Indonesian KRI Ki Hajar Dewantara was laid down on 11 May 1979, launched on 11 October 1980, and commissioned on 31 October 1981. The two ships had different machineries and weapons, with the Iraqi ship have more autocannons, while the Indonesian ship instead having helicopter deck in stern. Ki Hajar Dewantara had its hull and machineries built and installed in Yugoslavia, with her armaments and electronics installed in the Netherlands and Indonesia.

== Operational history ==
=== Ibn Khaldoum ===
Ibn Khaldoum was later renamed as Ibn Marjid. She was mainly used for training and transport during Iran–Iraq War and still operational in 1988, despite several Iranian claims that she has been sunk. In February 1991 she was severely damaged, albeit still afloat, as the result of Operation Desert Storm. Ibn Khaldoum survived the Gulf War, but with its capability reduced as she lacked spare parts for her Roll-Royce engines. She was sunk in the United States air attacks during the U.S. invasion of Iraq in 2003.

=== Ki Hajar Dewantara ===
In 1992, KRI Ki Hajar Dewantara, along with KRI Yos Sudarso and KRI Teluk Banten intercepted the Portuguese ship Lusitania Expresso in East Timor. Col. Widodo, deputy assistant of the Indonesian Navy's Eastern Fleet, told Radio Republik Indonesia from aboard the Indonesian warship KRI Yos Sudarso that the ferry entered Indonesian waters at 5:28 in the morning of 11 March 1992. At 6:07, Lusitania Expresso had traveled two to three nautical miles (3.7 to 5.6 km; 2.3 to 3.5 mi) into Indonesian territory and Captain Luis Dos Santos (Lusitania Expresso's captain) was ordered to leave immediately. Col. Widodo said the Portuguese ship captain obeyed the order and turned his ship around and headed back to sea.

== List of ships ==
| Name | Hull number | Builder | Laid down | Launched | Commissioned | Decommissioned | Status |
Iraqi Navy
| Ibn Khaldoum | 507 | Uljanik Shipyard | 1977 | 1978 | 20 March 1980 | 2003 | Renamed as Ibn Marjid, sunk in 2003 |
Indonesian Navy
| KRI Ki Hajar Dewantara | 364 | Split Shipyard | 11 May 1979 | 11 October 1980 | 31 October 1981 | 16 August 2019 | |

== See also ==
- Equipment of the Indonesian Navy
- List of former ships of the Indonesian Navy

== Bibliography ==
- Gardiner, Robert; Chumbley, Stephen; Budzbon, Przemysław (1995). Conway's All the World's Fighting Ships 1947-1995. Annapolis, Maryland: Naval Institute Press. ISBN 9781557501325.
- Sharpe, Capt. Richard (1989). Jane's Fighting Ships 1989-90. Jane's Information Group. ISBN 978-0710608864.
- Saunders, Stephen (2009). Jane's Fighting Ships 2009-2010. Jane's Information Group. ISBN 978-0710628886.
