= Frigate =

Type of warship

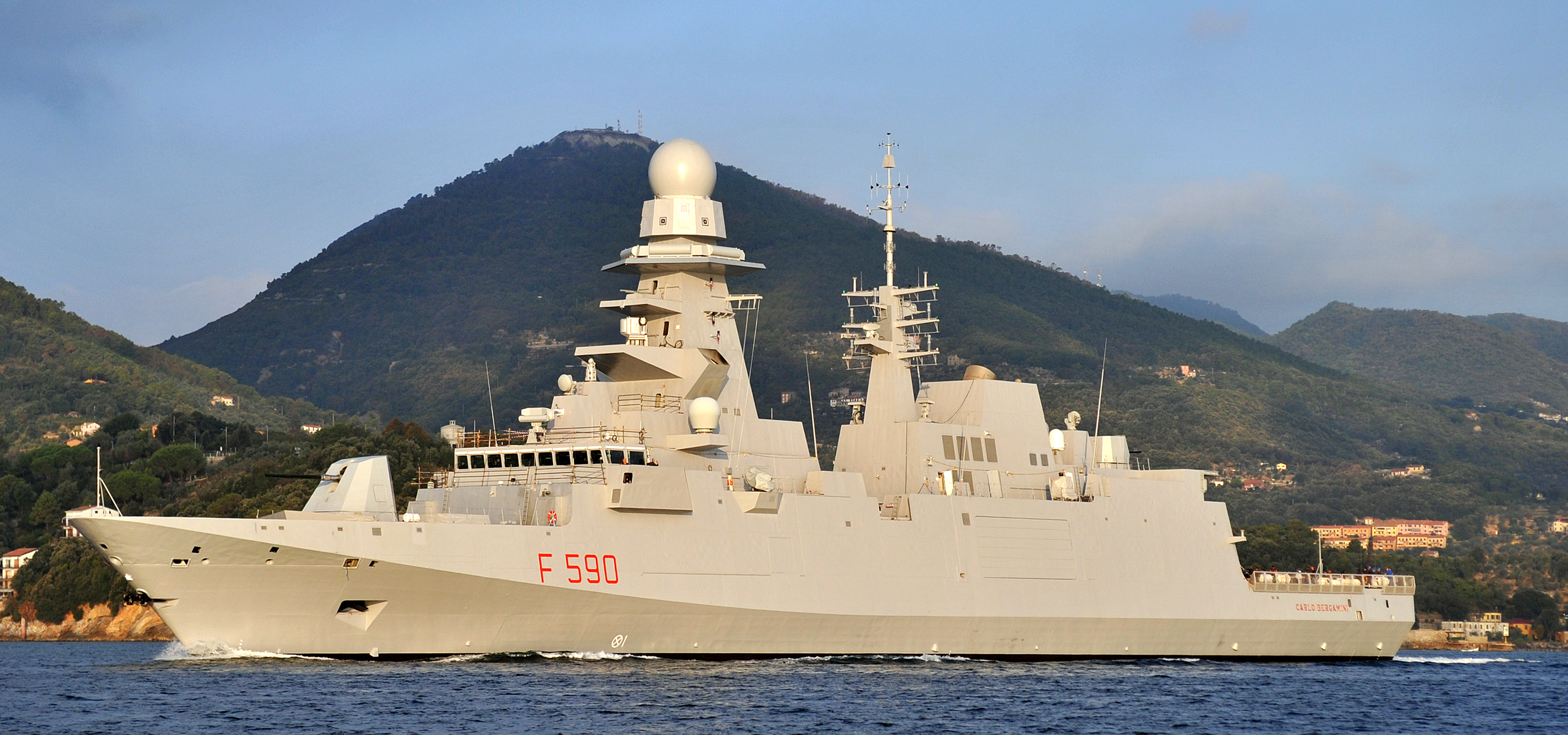
The Italian Navy frigate Carlo Bergamini in 2011

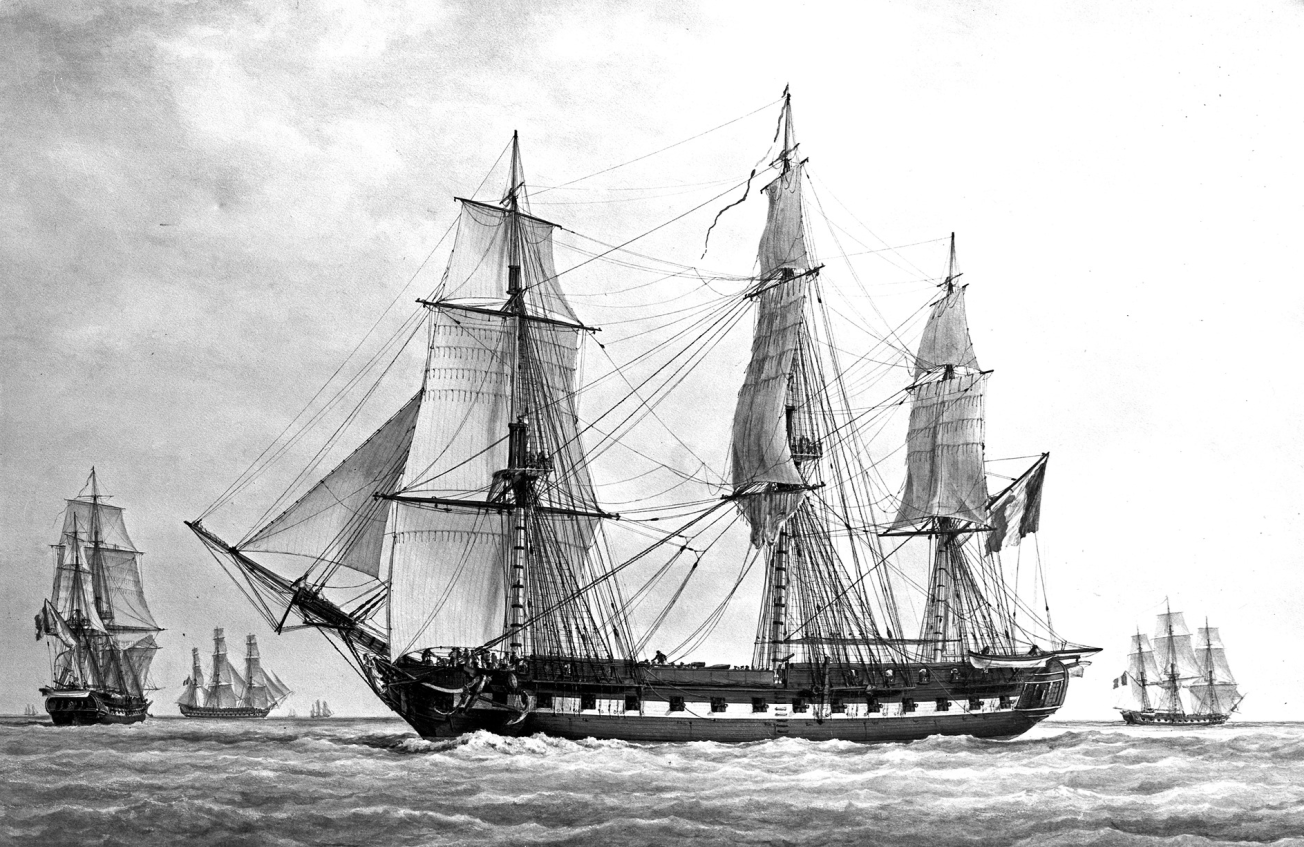
The French Imperial Navy frigate Pénélope

A frigate (/ˈfrɪɡɪt/) is a type of warship.

In different eras, the roles and capabilities of ships classified as frigates have varied. In the 17th to early 18th centuries the term "frigate" was loosely given to any full-rigged ship built for speed and manoeuvrability and intended for scouting, escort or patrol. By the second quarter of the 18th century, what is regarded as the "true frigate" was developed in France and subsequently copied by other navies. This type of vessel was characterised by a long sleek design with a single gun deck of 28 and 36 cannons, and an unarmed deck below used for berthing the crew.

In the mid-nineteenth century the definition of frigate was expanded to include the early ironclad warships, which also had a single gun deck. However, later developments in ironclad ships rendered the designation obsolete and the term fell out of favour in navies worldwide.

The term was reintroduced in the Second World War to describe a seagoing escort ship of intermediate size between a corvette and a destroyer. After the war, this definition has gradually expanded to include many different kinds of vessels, from large ocean-going anti-submarine warfare ships to corvettes, destroyers, and nuclear-powered guided-missile cruisers.

== Etymology ==
The etymology of the word (Italian: fregata; Dutch: fregat; Spanish/Catalan/Portuguese/Sicilian: fragata; French: frégate; German: Fregatte) remains uncertain, although it may have originated as a corruption of aphractus, a Latin word for an open vessel with no lower deck. Aphractus, in turn, derived from the Ancient Greek phrase ἄφρακτος ναῦς (aphraktos naus) – "undefended ship".

== Age of sail ==
=== Origins ===
The term frigate originated in the Mediterranean in the late 16th century, referring to a lighter galley-type warship with oars, sails and a light armament, built for speed and manoeuvrability. The first recorded usage of the term seems to date from 1562, when Alonso Pérez, Duke of Medina Sidonia armed a galley fleet complemented with vessels called fragatas which were claimed to be invented by him. These frigates proved impractical and were retired soon. Other sources state Medina Sidonia actually credited Álvaro de Bazán, Marquis of Santa Cruz with their invention. The term was later used as an alternate name for the galizabra, a kind of galleass built by Álvaro's brother Alonso in 1584 as a cross between a galley and a zabra.

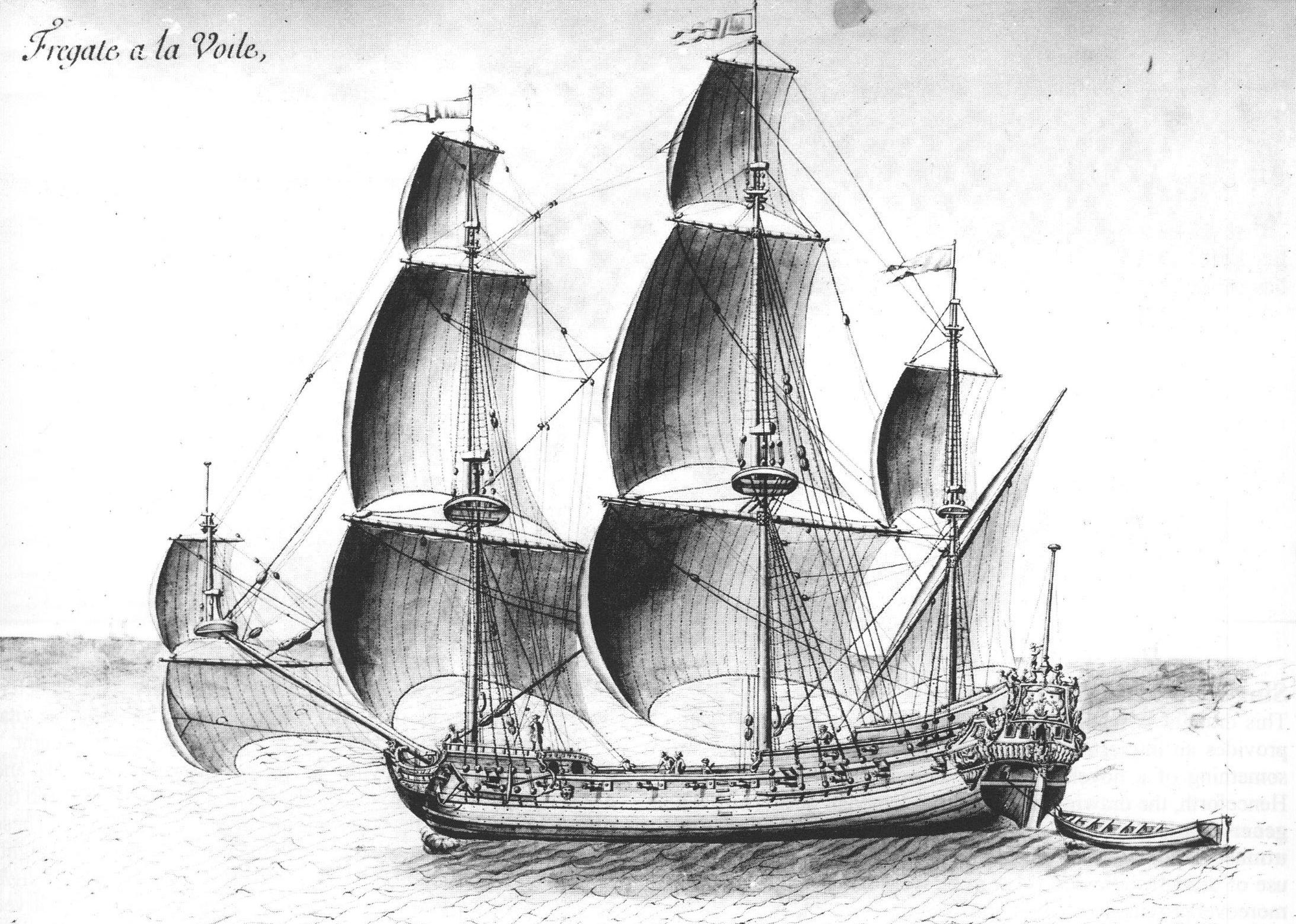
Light frigate, circa 1675–1680

In 1583, during the Eighty Years' War of 1568–1648, Habsburg Spain recovered the southern Netherlands from the Protestant rebels. This soon resulted in the use of the occupied ports as bases for privateers, the "Dunkirkers", to attack the shipping of the Dutch and their allies. To achieve this the Dunkirkers developed small, manoeuvrable, sailing vessels that came to be referred to as frigates. The success of these Dunkirker vessels influenced the ship design of other navies contending with them, but because most regular navies required ships of greater endurance than the Dunkirker frigates could provide, the term soon came to apply less exclusively to any relatively fast and elegant sail-only warship. In French, the term frigate gave rise to a verb – frégater, meaning 'to build long and low', and to an adjective, adding more confusion. Even the huge English Sovereign of the Seas could be described as "a delicate frigate" by a contemporary after her upper decks were reduced in 1651.

The navy of the Dutch Republic became the first navy to build the larger ocean-going frigates. The Dutch navy had three principal tasks in the struggle against Spain: to protect Dutch merchant ships at sea, to blockade the ports of Spanish-held Flanders to damage trade and halt enemy privateering, and to fight the Spanish fleet and prevent troop landings. The first two tasks required speed, shallowness of draft for the shallow waters around the Netherlands, and the ability to carry sufficient supplies to maintain a blockade. The third task required heavy armament, sufficient to stand up to the Spanish fleet. The first of the larger battle-capable frigates were built around 1600 at Hoorn in Holland. By the later stages of the Eighty Years' War (1568–1648) the Dutch had switched entirely from the heavier ships still used by the English and Spanish to the lighter frigates, carrying around 40 guns and weighing around 300 tons. In the 17th century, the term fregat in the Dutch Navy described any oceangoing warship carrying fewer than 40 guns. The effectiveness of the Dutch frigates became most evident in the Battle of the Downs in 1639, encouraging most other navies, especially the English, to adopt similar designs.

The fleets built by the Commonwealth of England in the 1650s generally consisted of ships described as "frigates", the largest of which were two-decker "great frigates" of the third rate. Carrying 60 guns, these vessels were as big and capable as "great ships" of the time; however, most other frigates at the time were used as "cruisers": independent fast ships. The term "frigate" implied a long hull-design, which relates directly to speed (see hull speed) and which also, in turn, helped the development of the broadside tactic in naval warfare. In the 17th century the term 'frigate' was sometimes applied very loosely and could be used for any warship. The more precise description of the time was the rating of the ship, frigates generally were ships of the fourth to sixth rates (in 1675, fourth rate up to 60 guns, fifth up to 40, sixth up to 20)

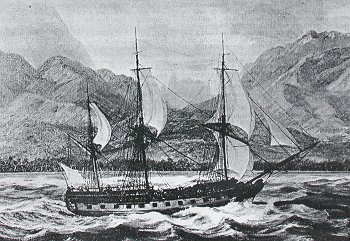
Boudeuse, of Louis Antoine de Bougainville

At this time, a further design evolved, reintroducing oars and resulting in galley frigates such as HMS Charles Galley of 1676, which was rated as a 32-gun fifth-rate but also had a bank of 40 oars set below the upper deck that could propel the ship in the absence of a favourable wind. In Danish, the word "fregat" often applied to warships carrying as few as 16 guns, such as HMS Falcon, which the British classified as a sloop. Under the rating system of the Royal Navy, by the middle of the 18th century, the term "frigate" was technically restricted to single-decked ships of the fifth rate, though small 28-gun frigates were classed as sixth rate.

=== Classic design ===
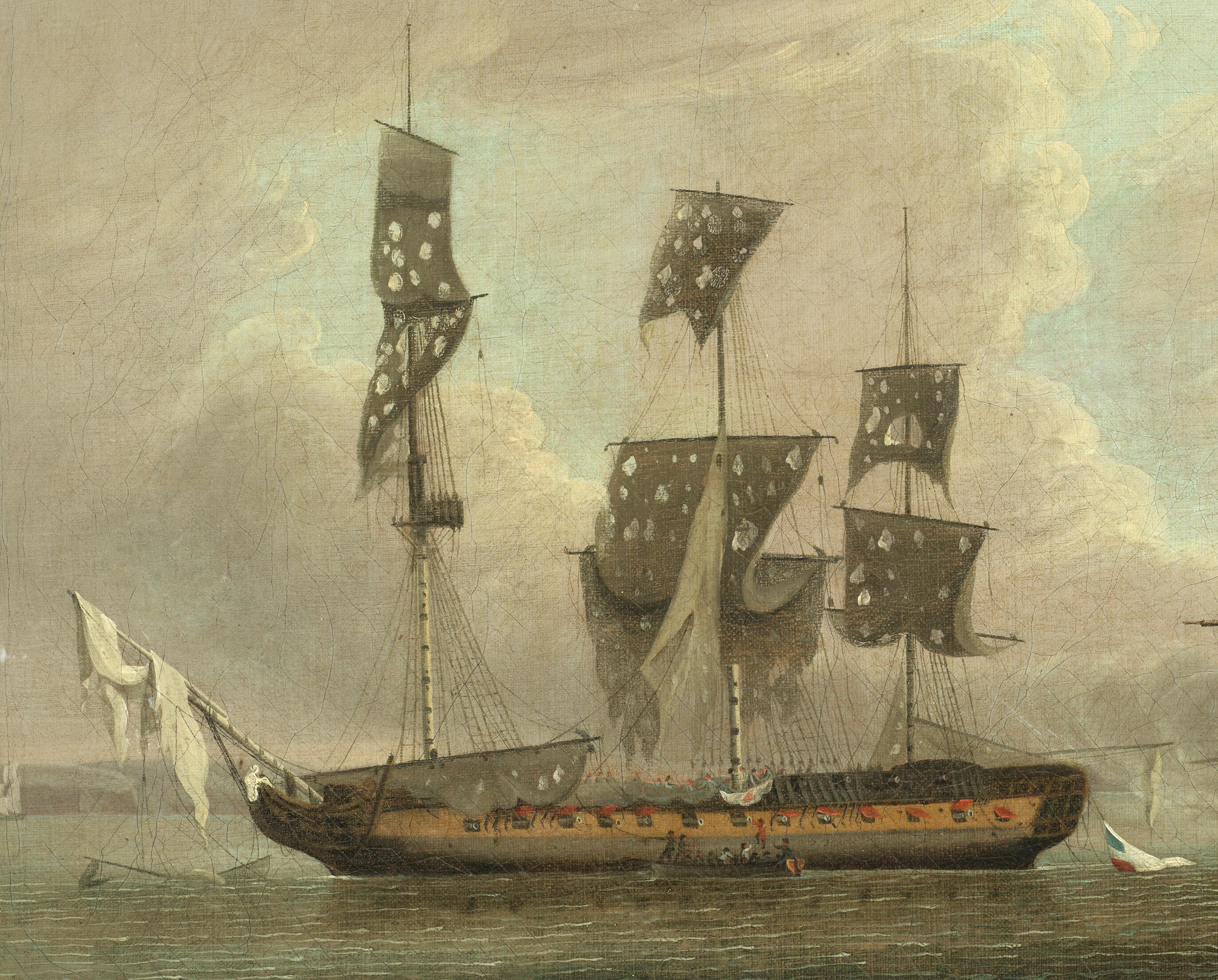
A Magicienne-class frigate

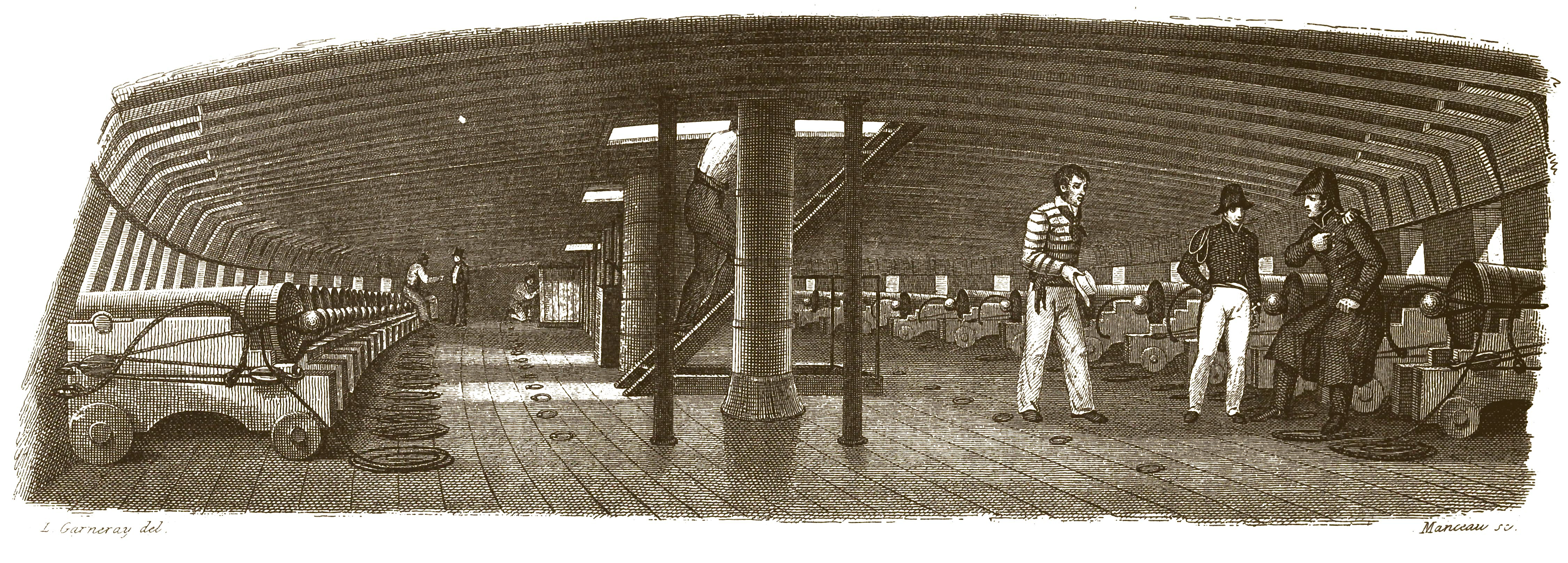
Gun deck of the Pallas-class frigate Méduse

The classic sailing frigate, or "true frigate", well-known today for its role in the Napoleonic Wars, can be traced back to French developments in the second quarter of the 18th century. The French-built Médée of 1740 is often regarded as the first example of this type. These ships were square-rigged and carried all their main guns on a single continuous upper deck. The lower deck, known as the "gun deck", now carried no armament, and functioned as a "berth deck" where the crew lived, and was in fact placed below the waterline of the new frigates. The typical earlier cruiser had a partially armed lower deck, from which it was known as a "half-battery" or demi-batterie ship. Removing the guns from this deck allowed the height of the hull upperworks to be lowered, giving the resulting "true-frigate" much improved sailing qualities. The unarmed deck meant that the frigate's guns were carried comparatively high above the waterline; as a result, when seas were too rough for two-deckers to open their lower deck gunports, frigates were still able to fight with all their guns (see the action of 13 January 1797, for an example when this was decisive).

The Royal Navy captured a number of the new French frigates, including Médée, during the War of the Austrian Succession (1740–1748) and the British were impressed by them, particularly for their inshore handling capabilities. They soon built copies (ordered in 1747), based on a French privateer named Tygre, and started to adapt the type to their own needs, setting the standard for other frigates as the leading naval power. The first British frigates carried 28 guns including an upper deck battery of twenty-four 9-pounder guns (the remaining four smaller guns were carried on the quarterdeck) but soon developed into fifth-rate ships of 32 or 36 guns including an upper deck battery of twenty-six 12-pounder guns, with the remaining six or ten smaller guns carried on the quarterdeck and forecastle. Technically, "unrated ships" with fewer than 28 guns could not be classed as frigates but as "post ships"; however, in common parlance most post ships were sometimes described as "frigates", the same casual misuse of the term being extended to smaller two-decked ships that were too small to stand in the line of battle. However, most ships of this size were called "ship sloops". A total of fifty-nine French sailing frigates were built between 1777 and 1790, with a standard design averaging a hull length of 135 ft (41 m) and an average draught of 13 ft (4.0 m). The new frigates recorded sailing speeds of up to 14 knots (26 km/h; 16 mph), significantly faster than their predecessor vessels.

=== Heavy frigate ===
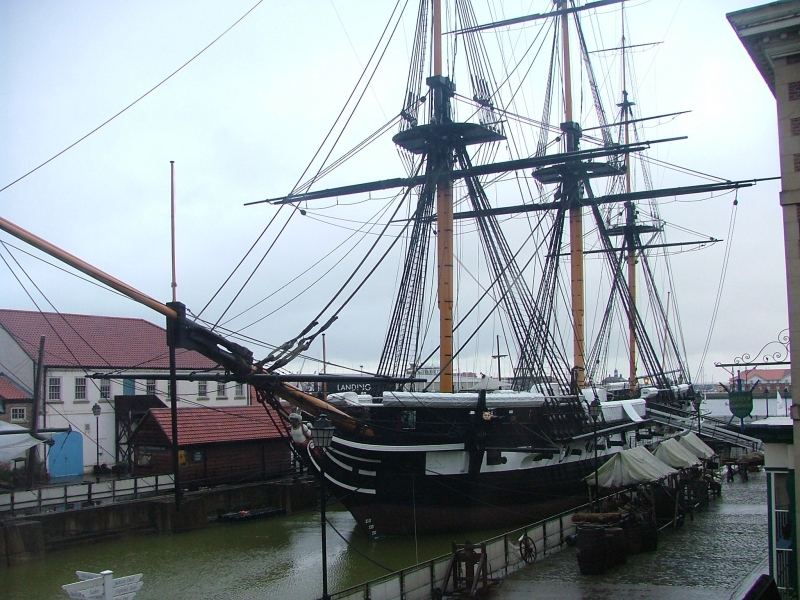
HMS Trincomalee (1817) a restored British 18-pounder, 38-gun heavy frigate

In 1778, the British Admiralty introduced a larger "heavy" frigate, with a main battery of twenty-six or twenty-eight 18-pounder guns (with smaller guns carried on the quarterdeck and forecastle). This move may reflect the naval conditions at the time; with both France and Spain as enemies, the usual British preponderance in ship numbers was no longer the case and there was pressure on the British to produce cruisers of individually greater force. In reply, the first French 18-pounder frigates were laid down in 1781. The 18-pounder frigate eventually became the standard frigate of the French Revolutionary and Napoleonic Wars. The British produced larger, 38-gun, and slightly smaller, 36-gun, versions and also a 32-gun design that can be considered an 'economy version'. The 32-gun frigates also had the advantage that they could be built by the many smaller, less-specialised shipbuilders.

Frigates could (and usually did) additionally carry smaller carriage-mounted guns on their quarterdecks and forecastles (the superstructures above the upper deck). In 1778 the Carron Iron Company of Scotland produced a naval gun which would revolutionise the armament of smaller naval vessels, including the frigate. The carronade was a large calibre, short-barrelled naval cannon which was light, quick to reload and needed a smaller crew than a conventional long gun. Due to its lightness it could be mounted on the forecastle and quarterdeck of frigates. It greatly increased the firepower, measured in weight of metal (the combined weight of all projectiles fired in one broadside), of these vessels. The disadvantages of the carronade were that it had a much shorter range and was less accurate than a long gun. The British quickly saw the advantages of the new weapon and soon employed it on a wide scale. The US Navy also copied the design soon after its appearance. The French and other nations eventually adopted variations of the weapon in succeeding decades. The typical heavy frigate had a main armament of 18-pounder long guns, plus 32-pounder carronades mounted on its upper decks.

=== Super-heavy frigates ===
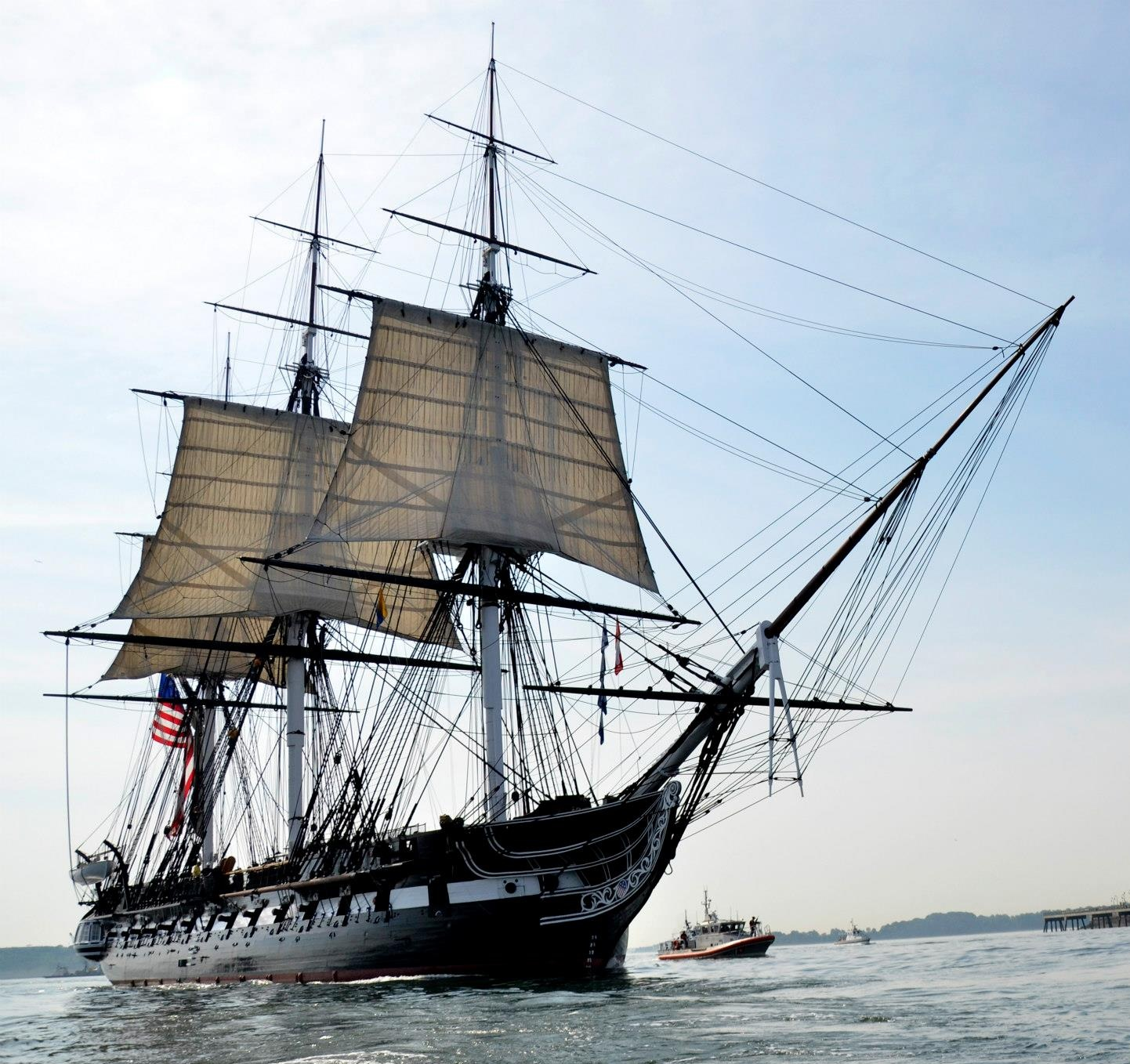
USS Constitution

The first "super-heavy frigates", armed with 24-pounder long guns, were built by the naval architect F H Chapman for the Swedish navy in 1782. Because of a shortage of ships-of-the-line, the Swedes wanted these frigates, the Bellona class, to be able to stand in the battle line in an emergency. In the 1790s the French built a small number of large 24-pounder frigates, such as Forte and Egyptienne, they also cut-down (reduced the height of the hull to give only one continuous gun deck) a number of older ships-of-the-line (including Diadème) to produce super-heavy frigates; the resulting ship was known as a rasée. It is not known whether the French were seeking to produce very potent cruisers or merely to address stability problems in old ships. The British, alarmed by the prospect of these powerful heavy frigates, responded by rasée-ing three of their smaller 64-gun battleships, including Indefatigable, which went on to have a very successful career as a frigate. At this time the British also built a few 24-pounder-armed large frigates, the most successful of which was HMS Endymion (1,277 tons).

In 1797, three of the United States Navy's first six major ships were rated as 44-gun frigates, which operationally carried fifty-six to sixty 24-pounder long guns and 32-pounder or 42-pounder carronades on two decks; they were exceptionally powerful. These ships were so large, at around 1,500 tons, and well-armed that they were often regarded as equal to ships of the line, and after a series of losses at the outbreak of the War of 1812, secret Admiralty instructions ordered British frigates (usually rated at 38 guns or less) to never engage the large American frigates at any less than a 2:1 advantage. USS Constitution, preserved as a museum ship by the US Navy, is the oldest commissioned warship afloat, and is a surviving example of a frigate from the Age of Sail. Constitution and her sister ships President and United States were created in a response to deal with the Barbary Coast pirates and in conjunction with the Naval Act of 1794. Joshua Humphreys proposed that only live oak, a tree that grew only in America, should be used to build these ships.

The Admiralty, concerned by repeated defeats in single-ship actions, responded to the success of the American 44s in three ways. They built a class of conventional 40-gun, 24-pounder armed frigates on the lines of Endymion. They cut down three old 74-gun Ships-of-the-Line into rasées, producing frigates with a 32-pounder main armament, supplemented by 42-pounder carronades. These had an armament that far exceeded the power of the American ships. Finally, Leander and Newcastle, 1,500-ton spar-decked frigates (with an enclosed waist, giving a continuous line of guns from bow to stern at the level of the quarterdeck/forecastle), were built, which were an almost exact match in size and firepower to the American 44-gun frigates.

=== Role ===
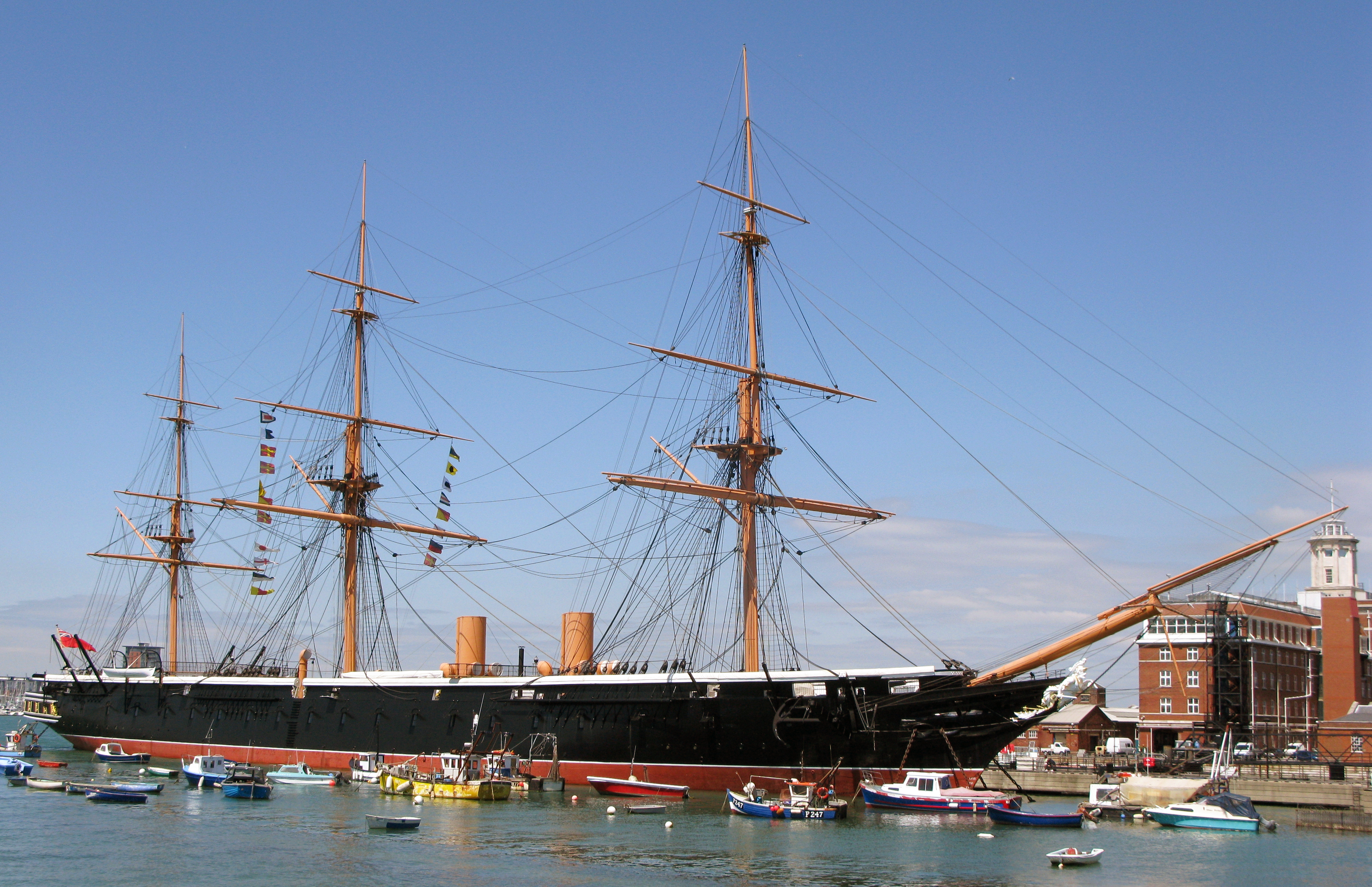
HMS Warrior, the first iron-hulled armoured steam frigate – the hull survived as an oil terminal dock and was restored to its original appearance in the late 20th century

Frigates were perhaps the hardest-worked of warship types during the Age of Sail. While smaller than a ship-of-the-line, they were formidable opponents for the large numbers of sloops and gunboats, not to mention privateers or merchantmen. Able to carry six months' stores, they had very long range; and vessels larger than frigates were considered too valuable to operate independently.

Frigates scouted for the fleet, went on commerce-raiding missions and patrols, and conveyed messages and dignitaries. Usually, frigates would fight in small numbers or singly against other frigates. They would avoid contact with ships-of-the-line; even in the midst of a fleet engagement it was bad etiquette for a ship of the line to fire on an enemy frigate which had not fired first. Frigates were involved in fleet battles, often as "repeating frigates". In the smoke and confusion of battle, signals made by the fleet commander, whose flagship might be in the thick of the fighting, might be missed by the other ships of the fleet. Frigates were therefore stationed to windward or leeward of the main line of battle, and had to maintain a clear line of sight to the commander's flagship. Signals from the flagship were then repeated by the frigates, which themselves standing out of the line and clear from the smoke and disorder of battle, could be more easily seen by the other ships of the fleet. If damage or loss of masts prevented the flagship from making clear conventional signals, the repeating frigates could interpret them and hoist their own in the correct manner, passing on the commander's instructions clearly. For officers in the Royal Navy, a frigate was a desirable posting. Frigates often saw action, which meant a greater chance of glory, promotion, and prize money.

Unlike larger ships that were placed in ordinary, frigates were kept in service in peacetime as a cost-saving measure and to provide experience to frigate captains and officers which would be useful in wartime. Frigates could also carry marines for boarding enemy ships or for operations on shore; in 1832, the frigate USS Potomac landed a party of 282 sailors and Marines ashore in the US Navy's first Sumatran expedition. Frigates remained a crucial element of navies until the mid-19th century. The first ironclads were classified as "frigates" because of the number of guns they carried. However, terminology changed as iron and steam became the norm, and the role of the frigate was assumed first by the protected cruiser and then by the light cruiser.

Frigates are often the vessel of choice in historical naval novels due to their relative freedom compared to ships-of-the-line (kept for fleet actions) and smaller vessels (generally assigned to a home port and less widely ranging). For example, the Patrick O'Brian Aubrey–Maturin series, C. S. Forester's Horatio Hornblower series and Alexander Kent's Richard Bolitho series. The 2003 film Master and Commander: The Far Side of the World features a reconstructed historic frigate, HMS Rose, to depict Aubrey's frigate HMS Surprise.

== Age of steam ==
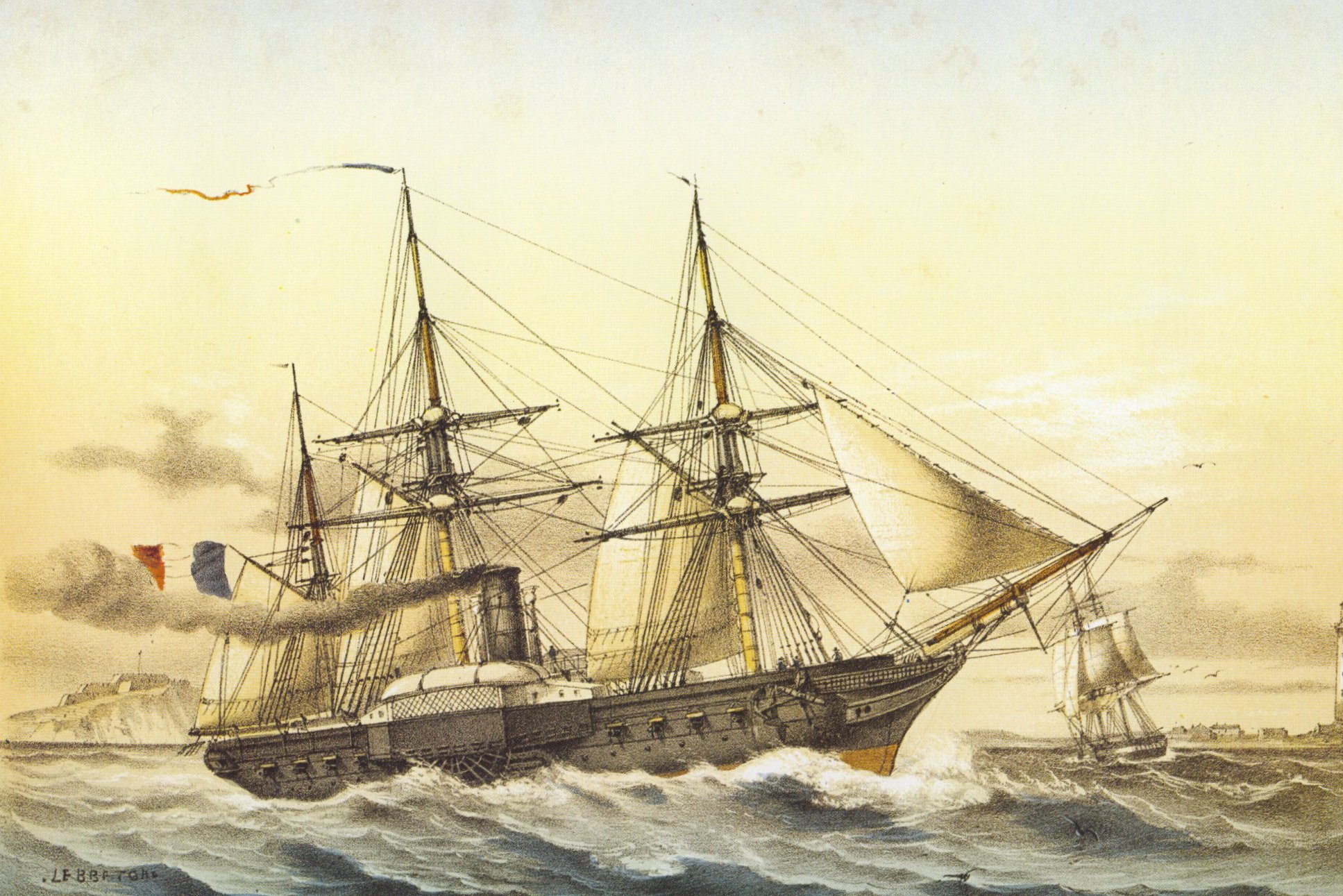
French paddle frigate Descartes

Vessels classed as frigates continued to play a great role in navies with the adoption of steam power in the 19th century. In the 1830s, navies experimented with large paddle steamers equipped with large guns mounted on one deck, which were termed "paddle frigates".

From the mid-1840s on, frigates which more closely resembled the traditional sailing frigate were built with steam engines and screw propellers. These "screw frigates", built first of wood and later of iron, continued to perform the traditional role of the frigate until late in the 19th century.

=== Armoured frigate ===
From 1859, armour was added to ships based on existing frigate and ship of the line designs. The additional weight of the armour on these first ironclad warships meant that they could have only one gun deck, and they were technically frigates, even though they were more powerful than existing ships-of-the-line and occupied the same strategic role. The phrase "armoured frigate" remained in use for some time to denote a sail-equipped, broadside-firing type of ironclad. The first such ship was the revolutionary Marine Nationale wooden-hulled Gloire, protected by 12 cm-thick (4.7 in) armour plates. The British response was HMS Warrior of the Warrior-class ironclads, launched in 1860. With her iron hull, steam engines propelling the 9,137 ton vessel to speeds of up to 14 knots and rifled breechloading 110-pdr guns, Warrior is the ancestor of all modern warships.

During the 1880s, as warship design shifted from iron to steel and cruising warships without sails started to appear, the term "frigate" fell out of use. Vessels with armoured sides were designated as "battleships" or "armoured cruisers", while "protected cruisers" only possessed an armoured deck, and unarmoured vessels, including frigates and sloops, were classified as "unprotected cruisers".

== Modern era ==
=== World War II ===
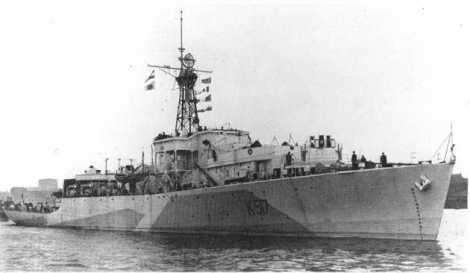
A Loch-class frigate

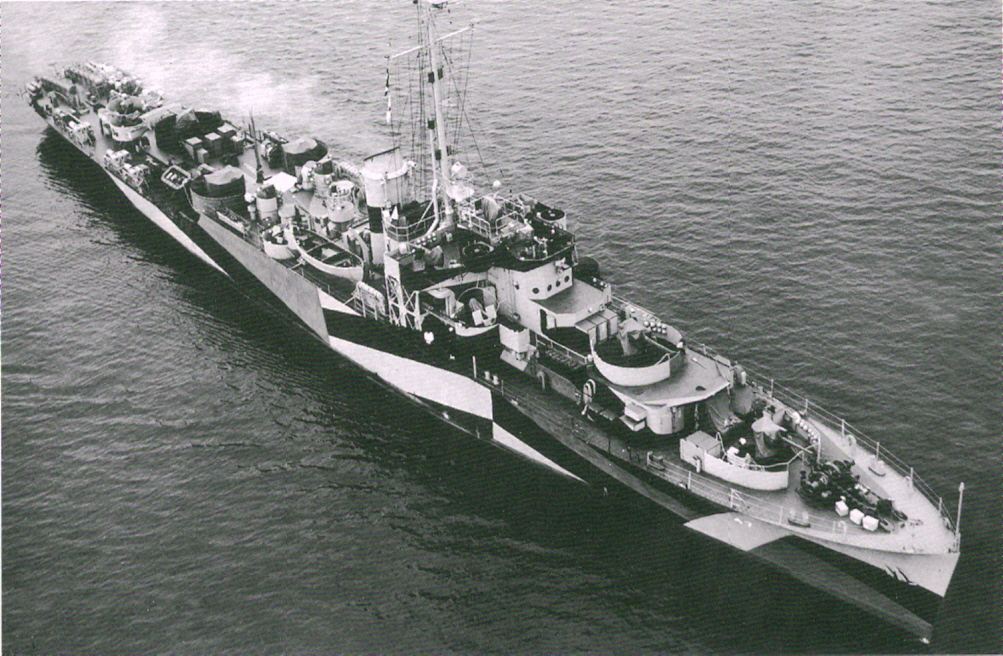
The U.S. Navy Tacoma-class patrol frigate USS Gallup at San Pedro, California, on 30 May 1944

Modern frigates are related to earlier frigates only by name. The term "frigate" was readopted during the Second World War by the British Royal Navy to describe an anti-submarine escort vessel that was larger than a corvette (based on a mercantile design), while smaller than a destroyer. The vessels were originally to be termed "twin screw corvettes" until the Royal Canadian Navy suggested to the British re-introducing the term "frigate" for the significantly enlarged vessels. Frigates, termed destroyer escorts by the US at the time, are less expensive to build and maintain than larger destroyers and cruisers. Small anti-submarine escorts specifically designed for naval use had previously been classified as sloops by the Royal Navy, and the Black Swan-class sloops of 1939–1945 (propelled by steam turbines as opposed to cheaper triple-expansion steam engines) were as large as the new types of frigate, and more heavily armed. 22 of these were reclassified as frigates after the war, as were the remaining 24 smaller Castle-class corvettes.

The frigate was introduced to remedy some of the shortcomings inherent in the Flower-class corvette design: limited armament, a hull form not suited to open-ocean work, a single shaft which limited speed and manoeuvrability, and a lack of range. The frigate was designed and built to the same mercantile construction standards (scantlings) as the corvette, allowing manufacture by yards unused to warship construction. The first frigates of the River class (1941) were essentially two sets of corvette machinery in one larger hull, armed with the latest Hedgehog anti-submarine weapon.

The frigate possessed less offensive firepower and speed than a destroyer, including an escort destroyer, but such qualities were not required for anti-submarine warfare. Submarines were slow while submerged, and ASDIC sets did not operate effectively at speeds of over 20 knots (23 mph; 37 km/h). Rather, the frigate was an austere and weatherly vessel suitable for mass-construction and fitted with the latest innovations in anti-submarine warfare. As the frigate was intended purely for convoy duties, and not to deploy with the fleet, it had limited range and speed.

It was not until the Royal Navy's Bay class of 1944 that a British design classified as a "frigate" was produced for fleet use, although it still suffered from limited speed. These anti-aircraft frigates, built on incomplete Loch-class frigate hulls, were similar to the United States Navy's destroyer escorts (DE), although the latter had greater speed and offensive armament to better suit them to fleet deployments. The destroyer escort concept came from design studies by the General Board of the United States Navy in 1940, as modified by requirements established by a British commission in 1941 prior to the American entry into the war, for deep-water escorts. The American-built destroyer escorts serving in the Royal Navy were rated as Captain-class frigates. The U.S. Navy's two Canadian-built Asheville-class and 96 British-influenced, American-built Tacoma-class frigates that followed originally were classified as "patrol gunboats" (PG) in the U.S. Navy but on 15 April 1943 were all reclassified as patrol frigates (PF).

=== Modern frigate ===
==== Guided-missile role ====
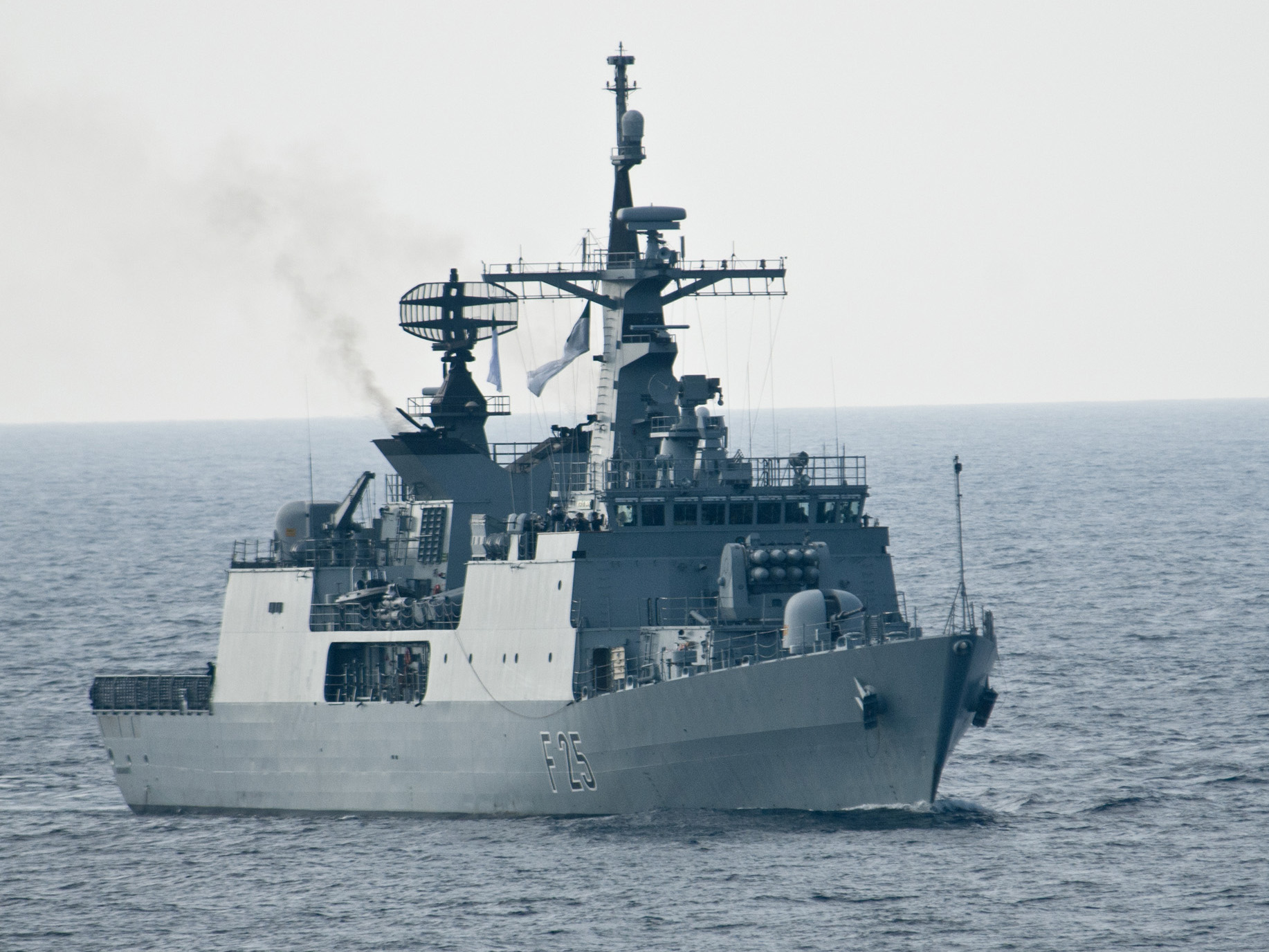
Bangladesh Navy frigate BNS Khalid Bin Walid steams off the coast of Bangladesh during CARAT 2012 exercise

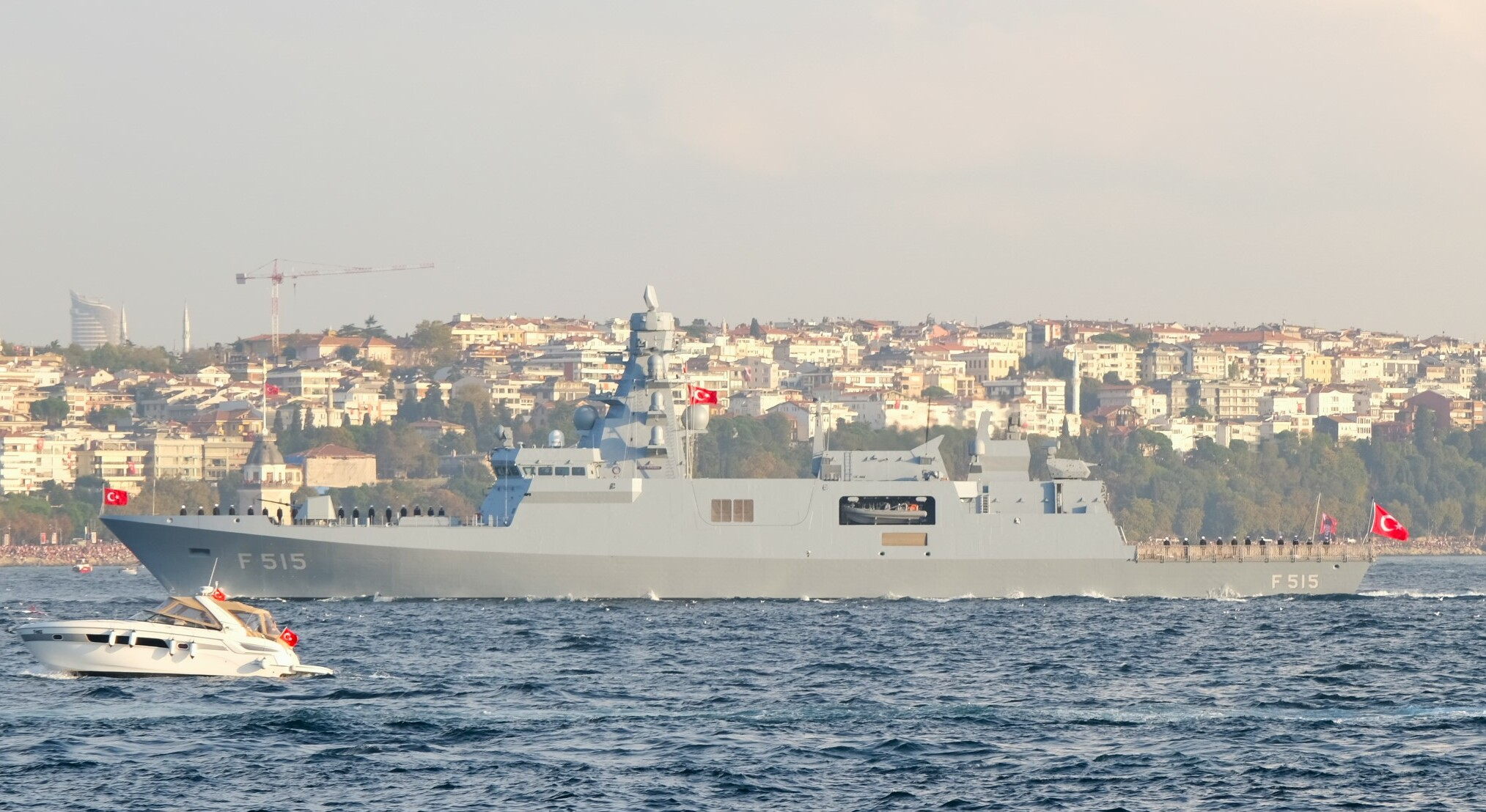
Turkish Naval Forces frigate TCG Istanbul (F 515) at the Bosporus strait, during the naval parade for celebrating the centennial of the Turkish Republic, 29 October 2023.

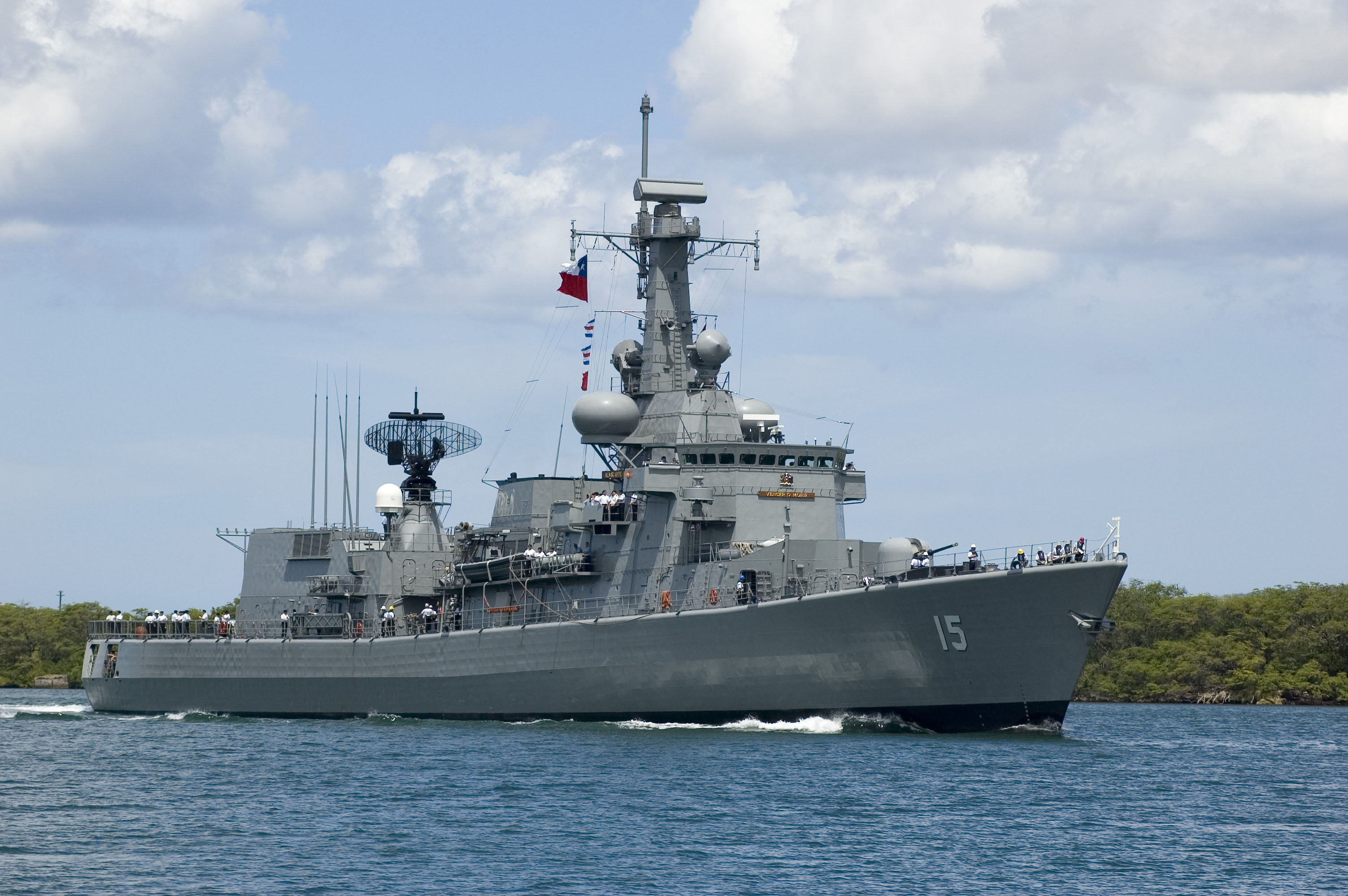
The Chilean Navy Karel Doorman-class frigate Almirante Blanco Encalada. This class is also operated in the Netherlands, Belgium and Portugal.

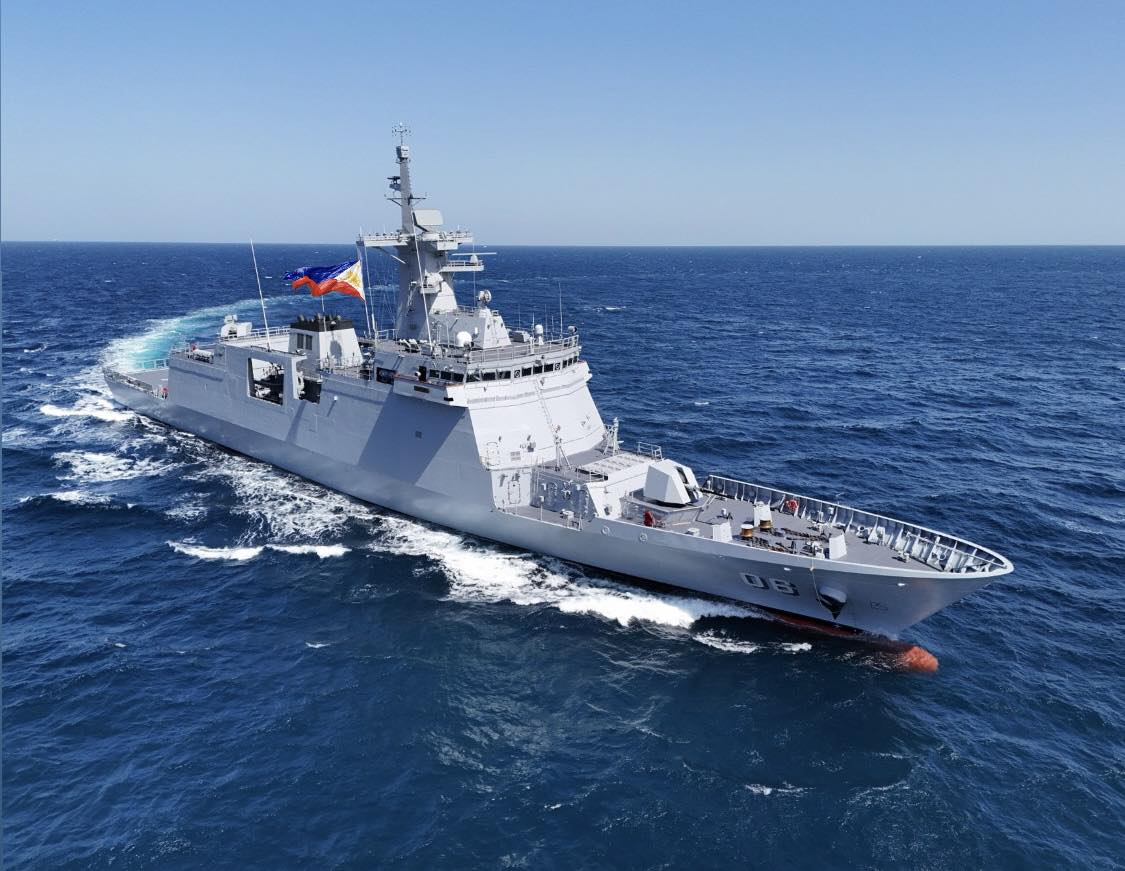
BRP Miguel Malvar (FFG-06), the lead ship of her class of guided-missile frigates of the Philippine Navy during sea trials off the coast of Ulsan, South Korea

The introduction of the surface-to-air missile after World War II made relatively small ships effective for anti-aircraft warfare: the "guided-missile frigate". In the US navy, these vessels were called "ocean escorts" and designated "DE" or "DEG" until 1975 – a holdover from the World War II destroyer escort or "DE". While the Royal Navy used similar designations for their warships built in the 1950s, they maintained the use of the term "frigate"; in the 1990s the RCN re-introduced the frigate designation. Likewise, the French Navy refers to missile-equipped ships, up to cruiser-sized ships (Suffren, Tourville, and Horizon classes), by the name of "frégate", while smaller units are named aviso. The Soviet Navy used the term "guard-ship" (сторожевой корабль).

From the 1950s to the 1970s, the United States Navy commissioned ships classed as guided-missile frigates (hull classification symbol DLG or DLGN, literally meaning guided-missile destroyer leaders), which were actually anti-aircraft warfare cruisers built on destroyer-style hulls. These had one or two twin launchers per ship for the RIM-2 Terrier missile, upgraded to the RIM-67 Standard ER missile in the 1980s. This type of ship was intended primarily to defend aircraft carriers against anti-ship cruise missiles, augmenting and eventually replacing converted World War II cruisers (CAG/CLG/CG) in this role. The guided-missile frigates also had an anti-submarine capability that most of the World War II cruiser conversions lacked. Some of these ships – Bainbridge and Truxtun along with the California and Virginia classes – were nuclear-powered (DLGN). These "frigates" were roughly mid-way in size between cruisers and destroyers. This was similar to the use of the term "frigate" during the age of sail during which it referred to a medium-sized warship, but it was inconsistent with conventions used by other contemporary navies which regarded frigates as being smaller than destroyers. During the 1975 ship reclassification, the large American frigates were redesignated as guided-missile cruisers or destroyers (CG/CGN/DDG), while ocean escorts (the American classification for ships smaller than destroyers, with hull symbol DE/DEG (destroyer escort)) such as the Knox-class were reclassified as frigates (FF/FFG), sometimes called "fast frigates". In the late 1970s, as a gradual successor to the Knox frigates, the US Navy introduced the 51-ship Oliver Hazard Perry-class guided-missile frigates (FFG), the last of which was decommissioned in 2015, although some serve in other navies. By 1995 the older guided-missile cruisers and destroyers were replaced by the Ticonderoga-class cruisers and Arleigh Burke-class destroyers.

One of the most successful post-1945 designs was the British Leander-class frigate, which was used by several navies. Laid down in 1959, the Leander class was based on the previous Type 12 anti-submarine frigate but equipped for anti-aircraft use as well. They were used by the UK into the 1990s, at which point some were sold on to other navies. The Leander design, or improved versions of it, were licence-built for other navies as well. Nearly all modern frigates are equipped with some form of offensive or defensive missiles, and as such are rated as guided-missile frigates (FFG). Improvements in surface-to-air missiles (e.g., the Eurosam Aster 15) allow modern guided-missile frigates to form the core of many modern navies and to be used as a fleet defence platform, without the need for specialised anti-air warfare frigates.

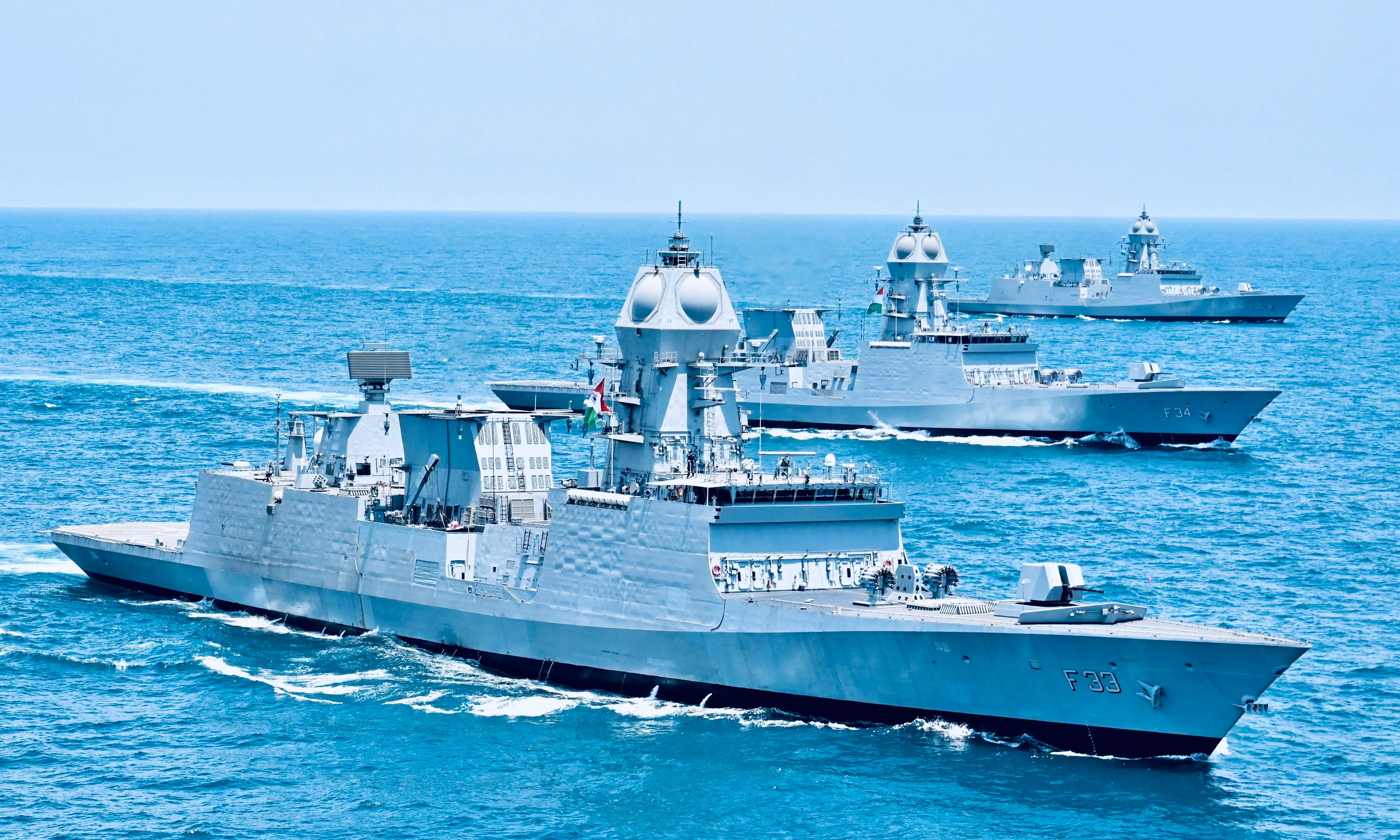
Nilgiri class frigates of the Indian Navy

Modern destroyers and frigates have sufficient endurance and seaworthiness for long voyages and so are considered blue water vessels, while corvettes (even the largest ones capable of carrying an anti-submarine warfare helicopter) are typically deployed in coastal or littoral zones, so are regarded as green-water vessels. According to Sidharth Kaushal of the Royal United Services Institute for Defence and Security Studies, describing the difference between 21st century destroyers and frigates, the larger "destroyers can more easily carry and generate the power for more powerful high-resolution radar and a larger number of vertical launch cells. They can thus provide theatre wide air and missile defence for forces such as a carrier battle group and typically serve this function". By contrast the smaller "frigates are thus usually used as escort vessels to protect sea lines of communication or as an auxiliary component of a strike group". The largest and most powerful destroyers, such as the Ticonderoga-class cruisers, are often classified as cruisers due to their extra armament and facilities to serve as fleet flagships.

==== Other uses ====
The Royal Navy Type 61 (Salisbury class) were "air direction" frigates equipped to track aircraft. To this end they had less armament than the Type 41 (Leopard-class) air-defence frigates built on the same hull. Multi-role frigates such as the MEKO 200, Anzac and Halifax classes are designed for navies needing warships deployed in a variety of situations that a general frigate class would not be able to fulfil, and not requiring destroyers.

==== Anti-submarine role ====
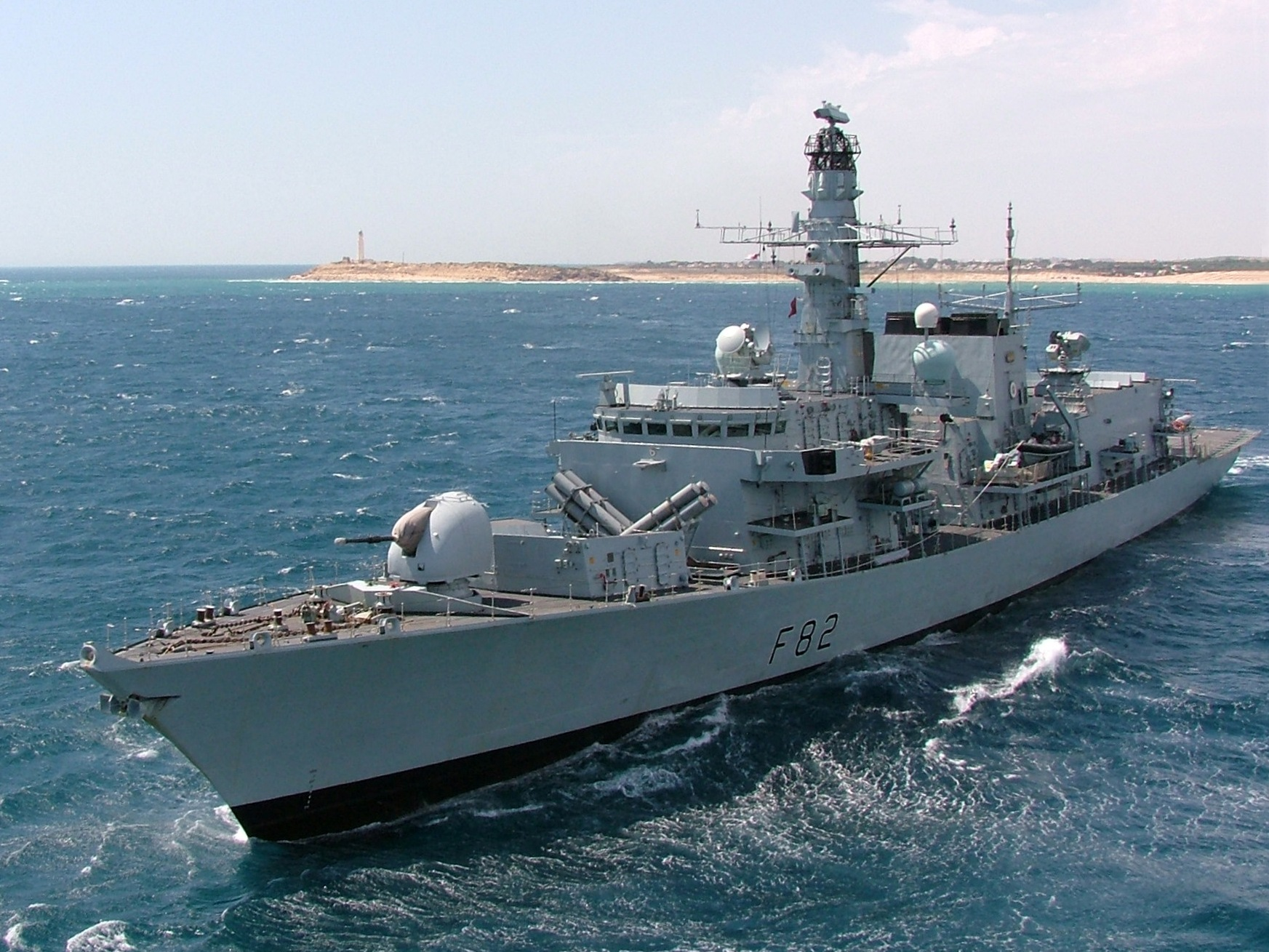
HMS Somerset of the Royal Navy. Type 23 frigates were built for anti-submarine warfare but are capable multi-purpose ships.

At the opposite end of the spectrum, some frigates are specialised for anti-submarine warfare. Increasing submarine speeds towards the end of World War II (see German Type XXI submarine) greatly reduced the margin of speed superiority of frigate over submarine. The frigate could no longer be slow and powered by mercantile machinery, and consequently postwar frigates such as the Whitby class were faster.

Such ships carry improved sonar equipment, such as the variable depth sonar or towed array, and specialised weapons such as torpedoes, forward-throwing weapons such as Limbo and missile-carried anti-submarine torpedoes such as ASROC or Ikara. The Royal Navy's original Type 22 frigate is an example of a specialised anti-submarine warfare frigate, though it also has Sea Wolf surface-to-air missiles for point defence plus Exocet surface-to-surface missiles for limited offensive capability.

Especially for anti-submarine warfare, most modern frigates have a landing deck and hangar aft to operate helicopters, eliminating the need for the frigate to close with unknown sub-surface threats, and using fast helicopters to attack nuclear submarines which may be faster than surface warships. For this task the helicopter is equipped with sensors such as sonobuoys, wire-mounted dipping sonar and magnetic anomaly detectors to identify possible threats, and torpedoes or depth-charges to attack them.

With their onboard radar helicopters can also be used to reconnoitre over-the-horizon targets and, if equipped with anti-ship missiles such as Penguin or Sea Skua, to attack them. The helicopter is also invaluable for search and rescue operation and has largely replaced the use of small boats or the jackstay rig for such duties as transferring personnel, mail and cargo between ships or to shore. With helicopters these tasks can be accomplished faster and less dangerously, and without the need for the frigate to slow down or change course.

==== Air defence role ====
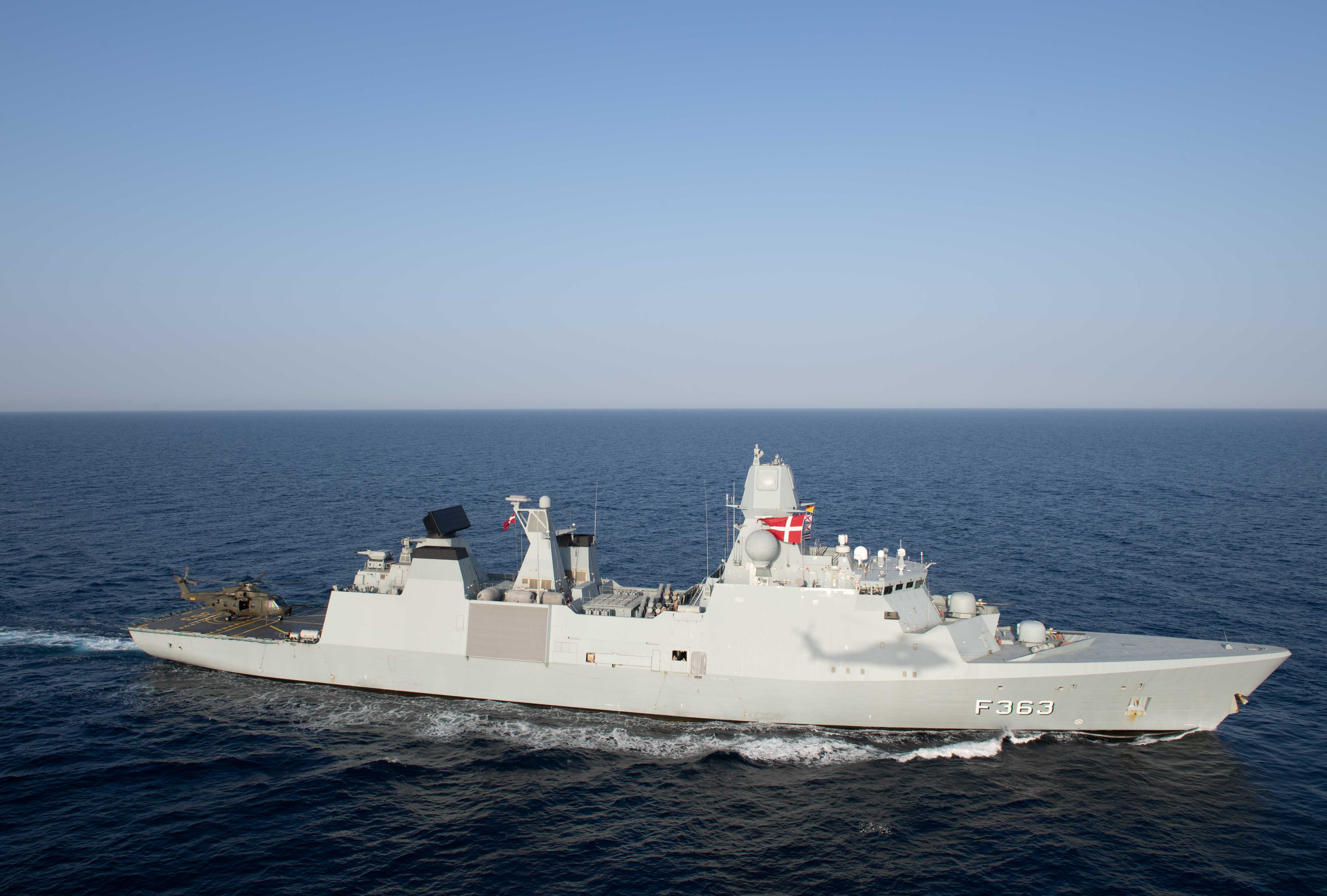
Iver Huitfeldt class

Frigates designed in the 1960s and 1970s, such as the US Navy's Knox-class frigate, West Germany's Bremen-class frigate, and Royal Navy's Type 22 frigate were equipped with a small number of short-ranged surface-to-air missiles (Sea Sparrow or Sea Wolf) for point defence only.

By contrast newer frigates starting with the Oliver Hazard Perry-class frigate are specialised for "zone-defence" air defence, because of major developments in fighter jets and cruise missiles. Recent examples include the De Zeven Provinciën-class air defence and command frigate of the Royal Netherlands Navy. These ships are armed with VL Standard Missile 2 Block IIIA, one or two Goalkeeper CIWS systems, (HNLMS Evertsen has two Goalkeepers, the rest of the ships have the capacity for another one.) VL Evolved Sea Sparrow Missiles, a special SMART-L radar and a Thales Active Phased Array Radar (APAR), all of which are for air defence. Another example is the Iver Huitfeldt class of the Royal Danish Navy.

==== Littoral combat ship (LCS) ====
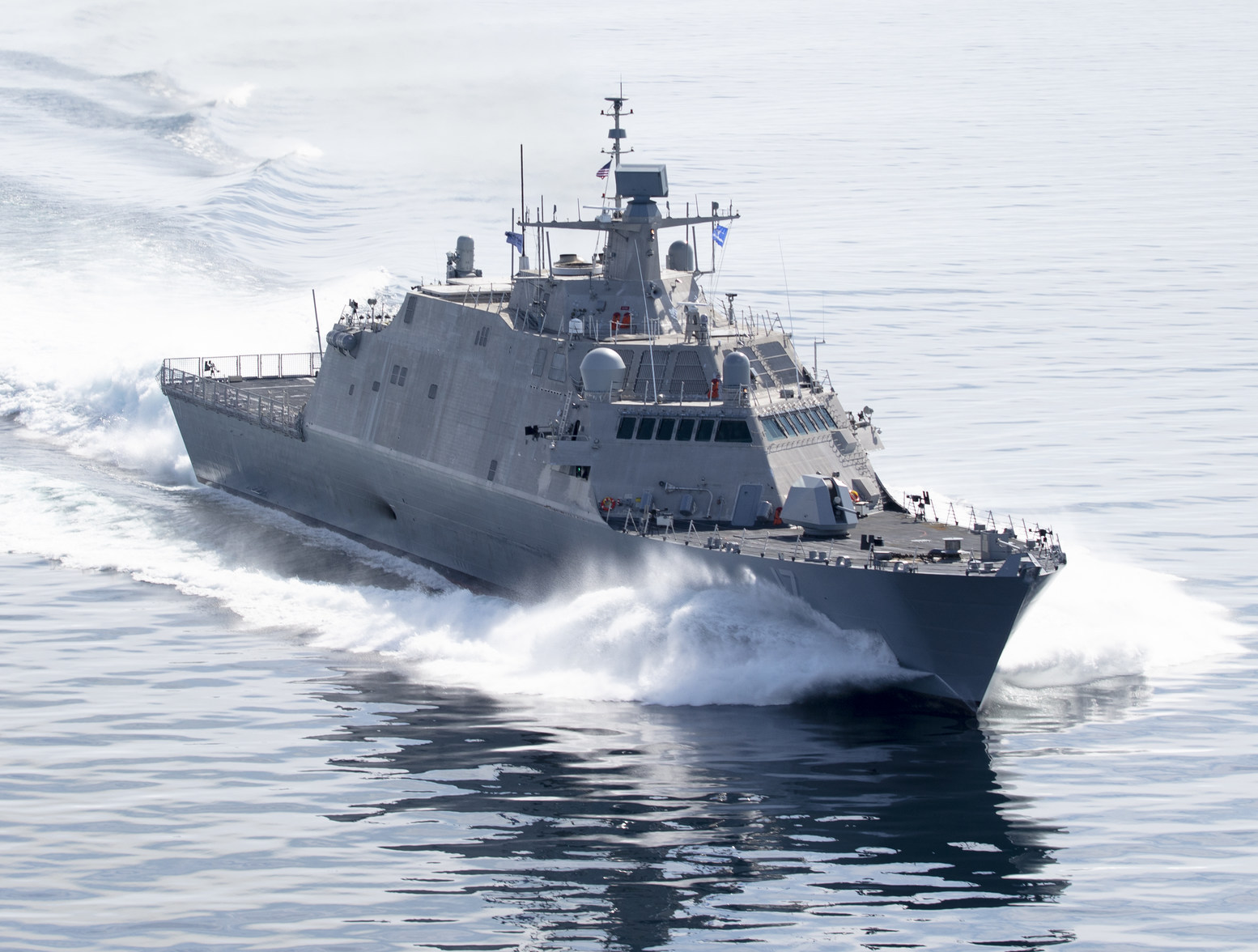
USS Indianapolis, a Freedom-class littoral combat ship of the United States Navy

Some new classes of ships similar to corvettes are optimized for high-speed deployment and combat with small craft rather than combat between equal opponents; an example is the U.S. littoral combat ship (LCS). As of 2015, all Oliver Hazard Perry-class frigates in the United States Navy have been decommissioned, and their role partially assumed by the new LCS. While the LCS class ships are smaller than the frigate class they will replace, they offer a similar degree of weaponry while requiring less than half the crew complement and offering a top speed of over 40 knots (74 km/h; 46 mph). A major advantage for the LCS ships is that they are designed around specific mission modules allowing them to fulfil a variety of roles. The modular system also allows for most upgrades to be performed ashore and installed later into the ship, keeping the ships available for deployment for the maximum time.

The latest U.S. deactivation plans make this the first time that the U.S. Navy has been without a frigate class of ships since 1943 (technically USS Constitution is rated as a frigate and is still in commission, but does not count towards Navy force levels). The remaining 20 LCSs to be acquired from 2019 and onwards that will be enhanced will be designated as frigates, and existing ships given modifications may also have their classification changed to FF as well. However, the United States Navy selected a FREMM multipurpose frigate variant for a new Constellation class of 20 frigates, to be built by Fincantieri beginning in 2024.

==== Further developments ====
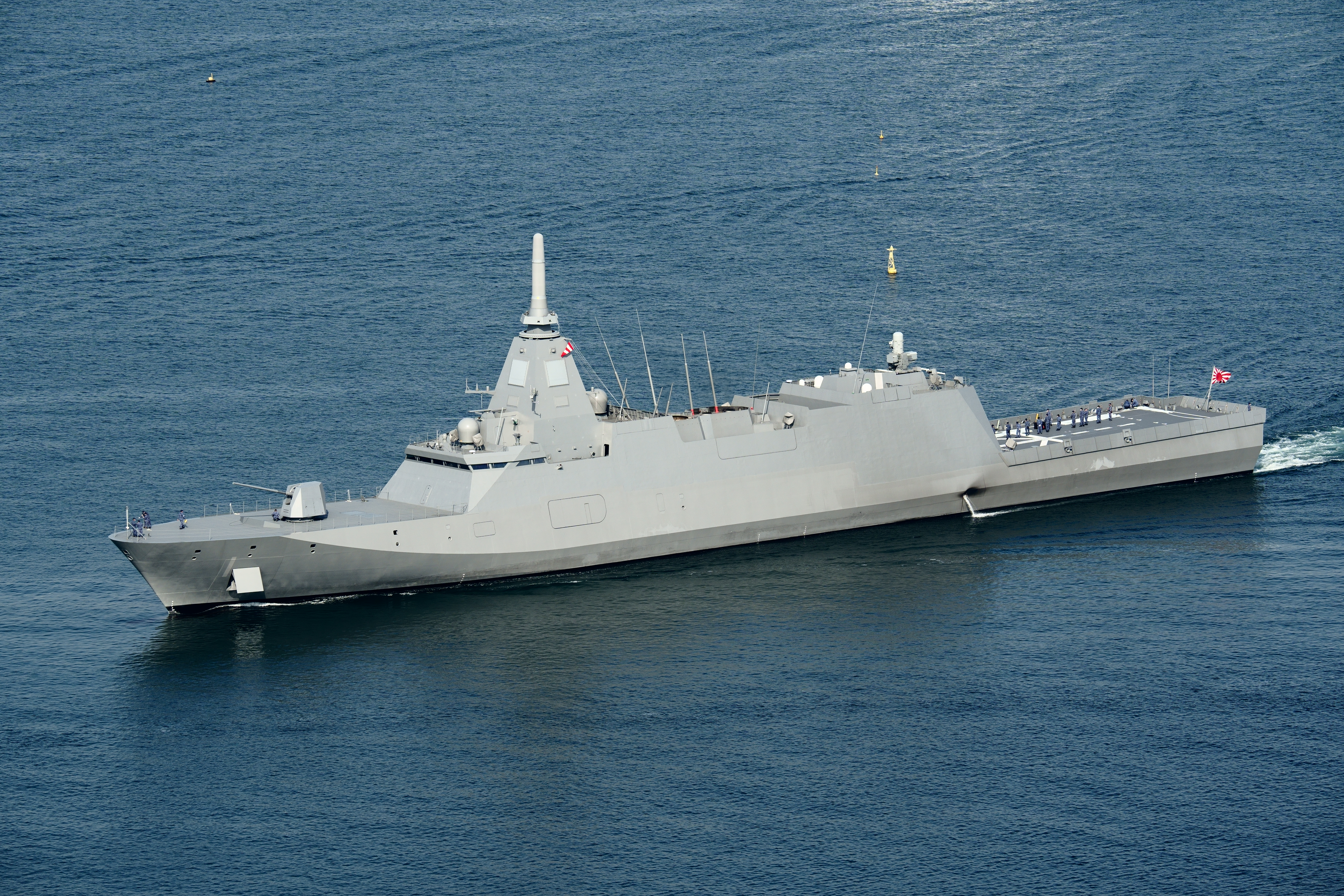
An upgraded version of the stealthy multi-mission Mogami-class frigate of Japan is currently under development.

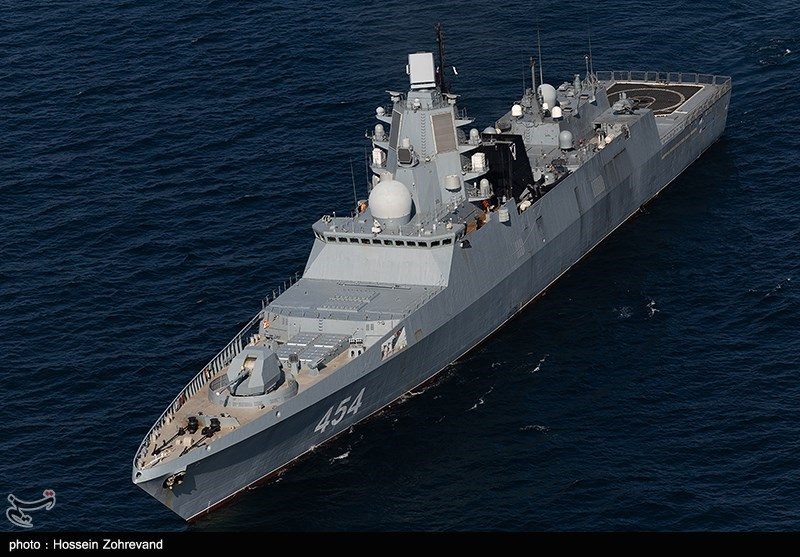
Admiral Gorshkov class frigates are armed with Zircon Hypersonic cruise missiles

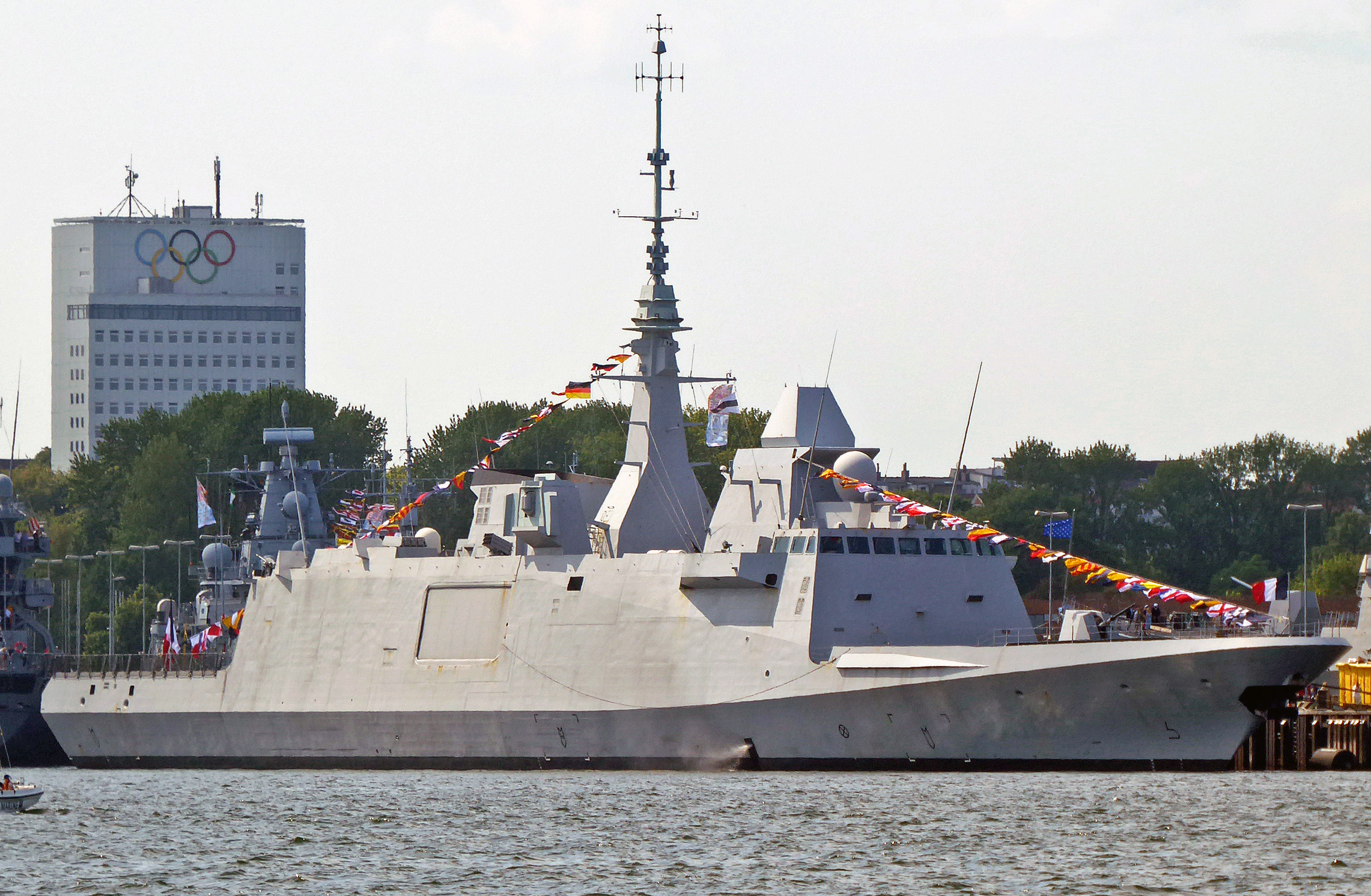
The stealthy FREMM multipurpose frigate of the French Navy

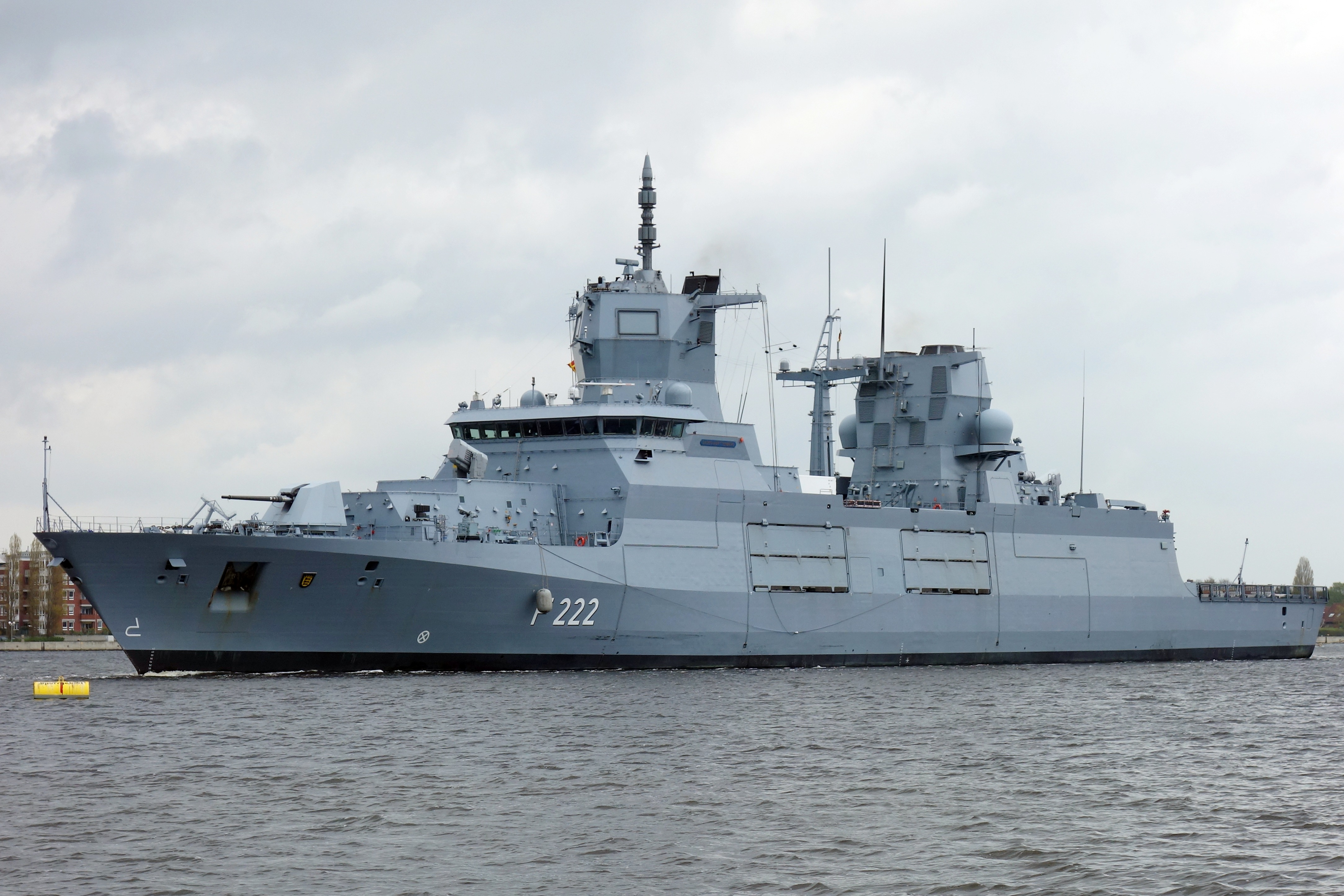
Baden-Württemberg, the lead ship of her class of frigates in the German Navy, is currently the largest frigate in the world.

Stealth technology has been introduced in modern frigate design by the French La Fayette class design. Frigate shapes are designed to offer a minimal radar cross section, which also lends them good air penetration; the manoeuvrability of these frigates has been compared to that of sailing ships. Examples are the Italian and French Horizon class with the Aster 15 and Aster 30 missile for anti-missile capabilities, the German F125 and Sachsen-class frigates, the Japanese Mogami-class frigate, the Russian Admiral Gorshkov classes with the Zircon missile, the Indian Shivalik, Talwar and Nilgiri classes with the Brahmos missile, and the Malaysian Maharaja Lela class with the Naval Strike Missile.

The modern French Navy applies the term first-class frigate and second-class frigate to both destroyers and frigates in service. Pennant numbers remain divided between F-series numbers for those ships internationally recognised as frigates and D-series pennant numbers for those more traditionally recognised as destroyers. This can result in some confusion as certain classes are referred to as frigates in French service while similar ships in other navies are referred to as destroyers. This also results in some recent classes of French ships such as the Horizon class being among the largest in the world to carry the rating of frigate. The Frégates de Taille Intermédiaire (FTI), which means frigates of intermediate size, is a French military program to design and create a planned class of frigates to be used by the French Navy. At the moment, the program consists of five ships, with commissioning planned from 2023.

In the German Navy, frigates were used to replace ageing destroyers; however in size and role the new German frigates exceed the former class of destroyers. The current German F125 Baden-Württemberg-class frigates are the largest class of frigates worldwide with a displacement of more than 7,200 tons . The same was done in the Spanish Navy, which went ahead with the deployment of the first Aegis frigates, the Álvaro de Bazán-class frigates. The Myanmar Navy is producing modern frigates with a reduced radar cross section known as the Kyan Sittha-class frigate. Before the Kyan Sittha class, the Myanmar Navy also produced an Aung Zeya-class frigate. Although the size of the Myanmar Navy is quite small, it is producing modern guided-missile frigates with the help of Russia, China, and India. However, the fleets of the Myanmar Navy are still expanding with several on-going shipbuilding programmes, including one 135 m (442 ft 11 in), 4,000-tonne frigate with the vertical missile launch systems. The four planned Tamandaré-class frigates of the Brazilian Navy will be responsible for introducing ships with stealth technology in the national navy and the Latin American region, with the first boat expected to be launched in 2024.

== Frigates in preservation ==
A few frigates have survived as museum ships. They are:

=== Original sailing frigates ===
- USS Constitution in Boston, United States; second oldest commissioned warship in the world, oldest commissioned warship afloat (Note: USS Constitution launched in 1797HMS Victory is the oldest commissioned (put on active duty) vessel since 1778 by 21 years, but she has been in dry dock since 1922.)
- NRP Dom Fernando II e Glória in Almada, Portugal
- HMS Trincomalee in Hartlepool, England
- HMS Unicorn in Dundee, Scotland

=== Replica sailing frigates ===
- Hermione, sailing replica of the 1779 Hermione, which carried Lafayette to the United States.
- Étoile du Roy, originally named Grand Turk was built for the TV series Hornblower in 1997. She was sold to France in 2010 and renamed Étoile du Roy.
- Russian frigate Shtandart, a sailing replica of Russia's first warship, homeported in Saint Petersburg, Russia.
- HMS Surprise in San Diego, United States, replica of HMS Rose, used in the 2003 film, Master and Commander: The Far Side of the World.

=== Steam frigates ===
- HNLMS Bonaire in Den Helder, Netherlands.
- Danish frigate Jylland in Ebeltoft, Denmark.
- Japanese frigate Kaiyō Maru, replica in Esashi, Japan.
- HMS Warrior in Portsmouth, England.
- ARA Presidente Sarmiento in Buenos Aires, Argentina.

=== Modern era frigates ===
- HDMS Peder Skram in Copenhagen, Denmark.
- HMAS Diamantina in Brisbane, Australia.
- TCG Ege (F256), formerly USS Ainsworth in Izmit, Turkey.
- TCG Yavuz (F240) in Istanbul, Turkey
- ROKS Taedong (PF-63), formerly USS Tacoma in South Korea.
- ROKS Ulsan (FF-951), in Ulsan, South Korea.
- ROKS Seoul (FF-952), in Seoul, South Korea.
- ROKS Masan (FF-955), in Gangwha Island, South Korea
- HTMS Tachin (PF-1), formerly USS Glendale in Nakhon Nayok, Thailand.
- HTMS Prasase (PF-2), formerly USS Gallup in Rayong Province, Thailand.
- HTMS Phutthaloetla Naphalai in Sattahip, Thailand.
- HTMS Phutthayotfa Chulalok in Sattahip, Thailand.
- CNS Yingtan (FFG-531) in Qingdao, China.
- CNS Xiamen (FFG-515) in Taizhou, China.
- CNS Ji'an (FFG-518) in Wuxue, China.
- CNS Siping (FFG-544) in Xingguo County, China
- CNS Jinhua (FFG-534) in Hengdian, China
- CNS Dangdong (FFG-543) in Dangdong, China
- INS Gomati in Lucknow, India (Planned)
- HMS President in London, England.
- HMS Wellington in London, England.
- HMS Ambuscade in Glasgow, Scotland (planned as of 2022)
- HNoMS Narvik in Horten, Norway.
- KD Hang Tuah in Lumut, Malaysia.
- UBS Mayu in Yangon,Myanmar

=== Former museums ===
- Dominican frigate Mella was on display in the Dominican Republic from 1998 to 2003, when she was scrapped due to her deteriorating condition.
- KD Rahmat was on display in Lumut, Malaysia from 2011 to 2017. She sank at her moorings due to poor condition, and was later scrapped.
- RFS Druzhnyy was on display in Moscow, Russia from 2002 to 2016, until the museum plans fell through and was sold for scrap.
- HMS Plymouth (F126) was on display in Birkenhead, England from 1990 to 2006, when the museum that operated her was forced to close. She was later scrapped in 2012.
- CNS Nanchong (FF-502) was on display in Qingdao, China from 1988 to 2012, when her faulty material made preservation difficult and was later scrapped.

== Operators ==
=== By country ===
- Algerian National Navy operates three Adhafer-class frigates and two MEKO A-200AN frigates
- Argentine Navy operates six Espora-class frigates/corvettes
- Bangladesh Navy operates a single modified Ulsan-class frigate
- Belgian Navy as of 2026, operates two ASW Frigates acquired second hand from the Dutch Navy
- Brazilian Navy operates six Niterói-class frigates, one Greenhalgh-class frigate, and one Tamandaré-class frigate
- Bulgarian Navy operates three Wielingen-class frigates purchased from Belgium
- Royal Canadian Navy operates twelve Halifax-class frigates
- China Coast Guard operates three Jiangwei I-class frigates transferred from the navy
- Colombian National Navy operates four Almirante Padilla-class frigates
- Royal Danish Navy operates four Thetis-class frigates and three Iver Huitfeldt-class frigates, two Absalon-class frigates.
- Ecuadorian Navy operates two Condell-class frigates purchased from Chile
- Egyptian Navy operates three FREMM multipurpose frigates, four MEKO A-200EN frigates, four Oliver Hazard Perry-class Guided missile frigates, two Knox-class Guided missile frigates, and a Black Swan-class frigate as a training ship.
- Navy of Equatorial Guinea operates a single Wele Nzas-class frigate
- German Navy operates four Brandenburg-class frigates, four Baden-Württemberg-class frigates and three Sachsen-class frigates with the latter sometimes classed as destroyers.
- Hellenic Navy operates nine Elli-class frigates purchased from the Netherlands, four Hydra-class frigates and one Kimon-class frigate
- Indian Navy operates twenty frigates, comprising six Nilgiri-class, three Shivalik-class frigates, eight Talwar-class frigates, and three Brahmaputra-class frigates.
- Indonesian Navy operates two Martadinata-class frigates, five Ahmad Yani-class frigates, purchased from the Netherlands, and two Thaon di Revel-class frigates, purchased from Italy.
- Italian Navy operates ten Bergamini-class frigates, four Thaon di Revel-class frigates.
- Japan Maritime Self-Defense Force operates eight Mogami-class frigates with more under construction and six Abukuma-class frigates.
- Korean People's Navy operates two Najin-class frigates
- Republic of Korea Navy operates six Incheon-class frigates, two Ulsan-class frigates, and eight Daegu-class frigates.
- Royal Malaysian Navy operates two Lekiu-class frigates
- Mexican Navy operates single Reformador-class frigate
- Royal Moroccan Navy operates three Tarik Ben Ziyad-class frigates.
- Myanmar Navy operates one Thalun-class frigate, two Kyan Sittha-class frigates, one Aung Zeya-class frigate and two Type 053H1 (Jianghu-II) class frigate
- Nigerian Navy operates a single Aradu-class frigate, though its operational status is doubtful, and a single Obuma-class frigate used as training hulk.
- Peruvian Navy operates seven Lupo-class frigates, with four being transferred from Italy
- Peru Coast Guard operates a single Lupo-class frigate, transferred from the Navy
- Philippine Navy operates two Jose Rizal-class frigates and two Miguel Malvar-class frigates
- Portuguese Navy operates three Vasco da Gama-class frigates
- Russian Navy operates one Gremyashchiy-class frigates/corvettes, seven Steregushchiy-class frigates/corvettes, three Admiral Gorshkov-class frigates, three admiral Grigorovich-class frigates, two Krivak-class frigates, two Gepard-class frigates and two Neustrashimyy-class frigates.
- Royal Saudi Navy operates four Al Madinah-class frigates
- South African Navy operates four Valour-class frigates, made in Germany based on the MEKO A200 design
- Royal Thai Navy operates a single Bhumibol Adulyadej-class frigate and two Naresuan-class frigate and lastly old frigates used as training ships, the Makut Rajakumarn and Pin Klao.
- Turkish Naval Forces operates four Yavuz-class frigates, four Barbaros-class frigates, and one Istanbul-class frigate.
- Bolivarian Navy of Venezuela operates one Lupo-class frigate

=== By class ===
==== Anzac-class frigate ====
- Royal Australian Navy operates seven ships
- Royal New Zealand Navy operates two ships

==== FREMM multipurpose frigate ====
- Egyptian Navy operates two Bergamini-class frigates from Italy, one Aquitaine-class frigate from France
- French Navy operates eight Aquitaine-class frigates (classified as "first-rate frigates" with NATO "D" symbol for destroyer)
- Italian Navy operates ten Bergamini-class frigates
- Royal Moroccan Navy operates one Aquitaine-class frigate ordered from France

==== Floréal-class frigate ====
- French Navy operates six ships
- Royal Moroccan Navy operates two ships ordered from France

==== Gepard-class frigate current operator ====
- Russian Navy operates two ships
- Vietnam People's Navy operates four ships

==== Hamilton-class patrol frigate ====
- Bangladesh Navy operates two Hamilton-class patrol frigates from the United States
- Nigerian Navy operates two Hamilton-class patrol frigates from the United States
- Philippine Navy operates three Hamilton-class patrol frigates from the United States
- Sri Lanka Navy operates two Hamilton-class patrol frigates from the United States
- Vietnam Coast Guard operates three Hamilton-class patrol frigates from the United States

==== Karel Doorman-class frigate ====
- Belgian Navy operates two ships purchased from The Netherlands
- Chilean Navy operates two ships purchased from The Netherlands
- Royal Netherlands Navy operates two ships
- Portuguese Navy operates two ships purchased from the Netherlands

==== Knox-class frigate ====
- Republic of China Navy operates five ships purchased from the US
- Egyptian Navy operates two ships purchased from the US

==== Koni-class frigate ====
- Algerian National Navy operates three ships
- Bulgarian Navy operates single ship
- Libyan Navy operates single ship

==== La Fayette-class frigate ====
- Republic of China Navy operates six Kang Ding-class frigates, which are the Taiwanese variant of the French La Fayette class
- French Navy operates five ships
- Royal Saudi Navy operates three Al Riyadh-class frigates, which are the Saudi variant of the French La Fayette class
- Republic of Singapore Navy operates six Formidable-class frigates, these are the Singapore variant of the French La Fayette class

==== Oliver Hazard Perry-class frigate ====
- Royal Bahraini Naval Force operates two ships donated from the US
- Chilean Navy operates two Adelaide-class frigates purchased from Australia, these are the Australian variant of the US Oliver Hazard Perry class
- Republic of China Navy operates 10 Cheng Kung-class frigates, which are the Taiwanese variant of the US Oliver Hazard Perry class
- Egyptian Navy operates four ships
- Pakistan Navy operates a single ship purchased from the US
- Polish Navy operates two ships purchased from the US
- Spanish Navy Operates six Santa María-class frigates, these are the Spanish variant of the US Oliver Hazard Perry class
- Turkish Naval Forces operates eight G-class frigates purchased from the US

==== Petya-class frigate ====
- Azerbaijani Navy operates single ship
- Vietnam People's Navy operates five ships

==== Sigma-class Frigate ====
- Royal Moroccan Navy operates one 10513 Sigma Class Frigate.
- Mexican Navy operates one 10514 POLA variant Sigma Class Frigate.
- Indonesian Navy operates two 10513 PKR variant Sigma Class Frigates.

==== Thaon di Revel-class ====
- Italian Navy operates four Thaon di Revel-class frigates.
- Indonesian Navy operates two Thaon di Revel-class frigates.

==== Type 053 frigate ====
- Bangladesh Navy operates two Jianghu II-class frigates and two Jianghu III-class frigates purchased from China
- People's Liberation Army Navy operates six Jianghu-class frigates and seven Jiangwei II-class frigates
- Myanmar Navy operates two Jianghu II-class frigates purchased from China
- Royal Thai Navy operates four Chao Phraya-class frigates and two Naresuan-class frigates purchased from China
- Pakistan Navy operates four Zulfiquar-class frigates (a variant of the Chinese Type 053H3 frigate)
- Sri Lanka Navy operates a single Jiangwei I-class frigate purchased from China

==== Type 054 frigate ====
- People's Liberation Army Navy operates 40 Jiangkai II-class frigates and two Jiang kai I-class frigates.
- Pakistan Navy operates four Tughril-class frigates (a variant of the Chinese Type 054A frigate)

==== Type 22 frigate ====
- Brazilian Navy operates single ship purchased from the UK
- Chilean Navy operates single ship purchased from the UK
- Romanian Naval Forces operates two ships purchased from the UK

==== Type 23 frigate ====
- Chilean Navy operates three ships purchased from the UK
- Royal Navy operates eight ships

=== Ships of note classed as destroyers ===
- Argentine Navy operates three Almirante Brown-class destroyers. This class's hull is MEKO 360H2 frigate.

=== Disputed classes ===
These ships are classified by their respective nations as frigates, but are considered destroyers internationally due to size, armament, and role.

- Egyptian Navy operates the ENS Tahya Misr. This is one of the Aquitaine-class variants of the FREMM Multipurpose frigates purchased from France, which is classified as a destroyer by France.
- German Navy operates three Sachsen-class frigates and four Baden-Württemberg-class frigates. These ships are officially classified as frigates by Germany, but regarded as destroyers internationally due to size and capability.
- Royal Moroccan Navy operates the Mohammed VI. This is one of the Aquitaine-class variants of the FREMM Multipurpose frigates purchased from France, which is classified as a destroyer by France.
- Royal Netherlands Navy operates four De Zeven Provinciën-class frigates. These ships are classified as frigates by the Netherlands, but regarded as destroyers internationally due to size and capability.
- Royal Norwegian Navy operates four Fridtjof Nansen-class frigates. These ships are subclasses of Spain's Alvaro de Bazan-class, and classified as frigates, but are regarded as destroyers due to their size and armament.
- Romanian Naval Forces operates the Romanian frigate Mărășești, classified as a destroyer until 2001. No official reason was given for this and there was no change in armament or capability, thus remaining in the destroyer type.
- Spanish Navy operates five Álvaro de Bazán-class frigates. These ships are officially classified as a frigates by Spain, but due to their size and capabilities are regarded internationally as destroyers. They also served as the basis for Australia's Hobart-class destroyers.

== Former operators ==
- Cuban Revolutionary Navy decommissioned its last true frigates, the Koni-class frigate in 1998.
- Dominican Navy decommissioned its last River-class frigate in 1998.
- Ethiopian Navy lost its entire fleet, including two Petya-class frigates and the training frigate Ethiopia, following the independence of Eritrea in 1991.
- Estonian Navy decommissioned EML Admiral Pitka in 2013.
- Finnish Navy decommissioned its last Riga-class frigate in 1985.
- Volksmarine decommissioned all three Koni-class frigates upon German Reunification in 1990.
- Islamic Republic of Iran Navy lost their entire frigate force, comprising four Moudge-class frigates and three Alvand-class frigates in the 2026 Iran war.
- Iraqi Navy lost its only operational frigate Ibn Khaldoum which was sunk in 2003.
- Israeli Navy decommissioned its last River-class frigate in 1959.
- Montenegrin Navy decommissioned both its Kotor-class frigates in 2019.
- Navy of Serbia and Montenegro transferred its two Kotor-class frigates to Montenegro upon their independence in 2006.
- Swedish Navy decommissioned its last two Visby-class frigates in 1982, following defence reviews.
- Syrian Navy decommissioned its last Petya-class frigate in 2018.
- Ukrainian Navy operated a single Krivak-class frigate Hetman Sahaidachny which was scuttled in 2022.
- United States Navy decommissioned its last Oliver Hazard Perry-class frigate in 2015.
- National Navy of Uruguay decommissioned its last João Belo-class frigate in 2022.
- Republic of Vietnam Navy transferred its six remaining Trần Quang Khải-class frigates to the Philippines following the Fall of Saigon in 1975. The seventh ship was captured by North Vietnam and recommissioned into the Vietnam People's Navy.

== Future development ==
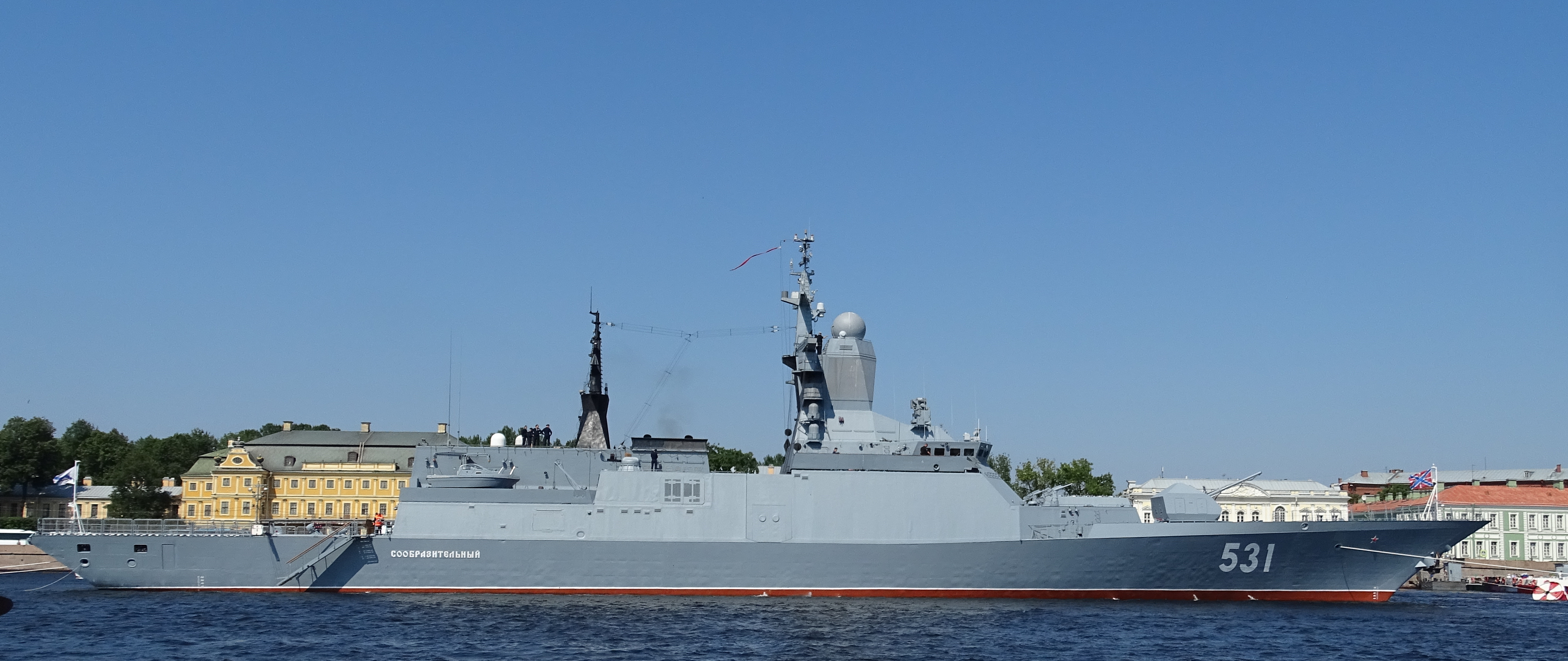
- Steregushchiy-class frigate
  Algerian National Navy ordered three Steregushchiy-class frigates from Russia.
- Royal Australian Navy ordered six Hunter-class frigateswhich are the Australian variant of the Type 26 frigates, and will carry the AEGIS combat system. The RAN is also planning to introduce 11 New FFM into service by 2037.
- Belgian Navy is planning to build three Anti-Submarine Warfare frigates to replace the current Karel Doorman-class frigates in a joint project with the Netherlands.
- Brazilian Navy is building eight Tamandaré-class frigates. to replace ageing Niterói-class frigates, Type 22 frigates, and Inhaúma-class corvettes.
- Republic of China Navy was planning in 2020 to build 10–15 new frigates to replace the ageing Knox class and Cheng Kung class.
- Finnish Navy is planning to build four Pohjanmaa-class corvettes which, despite their classification, have been described as frigates by the Finnish defence ministry and led to a debate over the classification in the Finnish Parliament.
- French Navy is building five Amiral Ronarc'h-class frigates.
- German Navy has planned eight MEKO A-200 DEU-class frigates to replace the Brandenburg-class frigates, and between five and eight F127 frigates to replace the Sachsen-class frigates.
- Hellenic Navy in 2021 was planning to build four Kimon-class frigates as a part of plans for replacing its ageing Elli-class frigates. Additionally, two Bergamini-class frigates will be transferred from Italy in 2029.
- Indian Navy is building a total of three frigates, comprising one Nilgiri-class frigates (with six already in service) and two Talwar-class frigate (with eight already in service). Another 7-8 ships of Project 17B are planned.
- Indonesian Navy in 2022 was fitting out one new Type 31 frigate with another one under construction. Indonesia will also order six Bergamini-class frigates, two Maestrale-class frigates, and two Istif-class frigates.
- Italian Navy is building 3 Thaon di Revel-class frigates, Italy is also commission 2 more Bergamini-class EVO frigates.
- Japan Maritime Self-Defense Force is building two more Mogami-class frigates to replace the Abukuma-class destroyer escorts, and will then build 12 New FFM frigates to supplement the fleet.
- Republic of Korea Navy is building six Chungnam-class frigates.
- Royal Malaysian Navy is building five Maharaja Lela-class frigates, cut down from six in early 2023 to reduce cost.
- Mexican Navy will commission one more Reformador-class frigate.
- Myanmar Navy is constructing a new frigate which is 135 m (442 ft 11 in) long and displaces 4,000 tonnes.
- Royal Netherlands Navy is planning to build four Anti-Submarine Warfare frigates to replace the current Karel Doorman-class frigates. It is a joint project with Belgium.
- Royal Norwegian Navy has ordered five Type 26 Frigates from the UK, to be built on the Clyde alongside the Royal Navy's order.
- Philippine Navy in 2025 ordered two additional Miguel Malvar-class frigates
- Polish Navy in 2026 is building three Projekt 106 frigates to replace its ageing Oliver Hazard Perry-class frigates.
- Pakistan Navy in 2024 was building 6-8 Jinnah-class frigates.
- Portuguese Navy will receive three FREMM multipurpose frigates, to be built in Italy.
- Russian Navy is building three more Steregushchiy-class frigates, five more Gremyashchiy-class frigates, and seven more Admiral Gorshkov-class frigates.
- Royal Saudi Navy ordered four upgraded versions of the Freedom-class littoral combat ship from the United States to replace the ageing Al Madinah-class frigates.
- Spanish Navy is planning to build five F110-class frigates to replace Spain's Santa María-class frigates.
- Swedish Navy is building four Luleå-class frigates.
- Royal Thai Navy is building an additional Bhumibol Adulyadej-class frigate.
- Turkish Naval Forces is building seven more Istanbul-class frigates as a part of the MILGEM project.
- Ukrainian Navy was building one Volodymyr Velykyi-class frigate. Construction began in 2011, then suffered delays and was completely stopped in 2014. The Black Sea Shipyard responsible for the program went bankrupt in 2021, the ship was only 17% complete. It was hoped that this class would help rebuild the Ukrainian Navy, which has been depleted since the capture of most of its fleet following the 2014 Russian Annexation of Crimea. The United States has offered to transfer two Oliver Hazard Perry-class frigates to Ukraine.
- Royal Navy is building eight Type 26 frigates which, along with five planned Type 31 frigates, will replace the Type 23 frigates currently in service.
- United States Navy is building two Constellation-class frigates based on a variant of the FREMM multipurpose frigate, to replace the decommissioned Oliver Hazard Perry-class frigates. The 18 other ships of the class were cancelled in November 2025, and it was announced in December 2025 that the National Security Cutter would be used as the basis for a replacement program named FF(X).
- Vietnam People's Navy is building a new class of anti-submarine frigates.

== See also ==
- Frigate 36, a sailboat design named after the warship type
- Soviet Udaloy-class destroyer design named Project 1155 Fregat ("frigate" or "frigatebird")
- List of escorteurs of the French Navy
- List of frigate classes
- List of frigate classes by country
- List of frigates of World War II
- United States Navy 1975 ship reclassification
