= Iraqi frigate Ibn Khaldun =

Former training frigate of Iraqi Navy

History

Iraq
- Name: Ibn Khaldun (ابن خلدون)
- Renamed: Ibn Marjid (ابن ماجد)
- Namesake: Ibn Khaldun; Ahmad ibn Mājid
- Builder: Uljanik Shipyard, Pula, Yugoslavia
- Laid down: 1977
- Launched: 1978
- Commissioned: 20 March 1980
- Identification: Pennant number: 507
- Fate: Sunk by air attacks in 2003

General characteristics
- Class & type: Training frigate
- Displacement: 1,850 long tons (1,880 t) full load
- Length: 96.7 m (317 ft)
- Beam: 11.2 m (37 ft)
- Draught: 4.5 m (15 ft)
- Propulsion: CODOG; 1 x Rolls-Royce Olympus TM3B gas turbine rated at 22,300 shaft horsepower (16.6 MW); 2 x MTU 16V956 TB91 diesel engines rated at 7,100 shaft horsepower (5.3 MW)
- Speed: 26 knots (48 km/h; 30 mph) on gas; 20 knots (37 km/h; 23 mph) on diesels
- Range: 4,000 nautical miles (7,400 km) at 20 knots (37 km/h)
- Complement: 93 crew, 100 cadets
- Sensors & processing systems: Philips Elektronik 9LV200 Mk 2 fire control radar; Racal Decca 1229 surface search radar; hull mounted sonar; ECM-ESM suite
- Armament: 1 × Bofors 57 mm/70 Mk 1 gun; 1 × Bofors 40 mm/70 gun; 4 × twin-barrel Rheinmetall Rh-202 20 mm autocannons; 2 × 533 mm (21 in) torpedo tubes; 1 × depth charge projector

Ibn Khaldun (507) (Arabic: ابن خلدون) was a training frigate of the Iraqi Navy that was built in SFR Yugoslavia. Later the frigate was renamed to Ibn Marjid (Arabic: ابن ماجد). She has a near sister ship, the Indonesian corvette KRI Ki Hajar Dewantara.

== Design and description ==
Ibn Khaldun has a length of 96.7 m (317 ft), a beam of 11.2 m (37 ft), with a draught of 4.5 m (15 ft) and her displacement is 1,850 long tons (1,880 t) at full load. The ship was powered by combined diesel or gas (CODOG) propulsion, consisted of a Rolls-Royce Marine Olympus TM3B gas turbine with sustained power output of 22,300 shaft horsepower (16.6 MW), and two MTU 16V 956TB91 diesel engines with sustained power output of 7,100 shaft horsepower (5.3 MW), distributed in two shafts. She was also equipped with controllable pitch propeller. Her maximum speed are 26 knots (48 km/h) with gas turbine and 20 knots (37 km/h) with diesels. The ship had a range of 4,000 nautical miles (7,400 km) while cruising at 20 knots (37 km/h).

The ship has a complement of 93 personnel, with the addition of 100 cadets for training purpose. She was armed with one Bofors 57 mm L/70 Mk 1 naval gun, one Bofors 40 mm Automatic Gun L/70, and four 20 mm Rheinmetall Mk 20 Rh-202 autocannons in twin mount. The ship also armed with two 533 millimetres (21.0 in) torpedo tubes and one GM 101/41 depth charge projector. She was designed to be able to carry four MM38 Exocet anti-ship missiles with two launchers, but the launchers itself were never fitted. As a training ship, Ibn Khaldun has classroom and additional bridge, navigation room, radio room, and accommodations.

Her electronic system and sensors consisted of Philips Elektronik 9LV200 Mk 2 fire control radar, two Racal Decca 1229 surface search/navigation radars, a hull-mounted sonar, and electronic countermeasure-electronic support measures suite.

== Construction and career ==
The ship was laid down in 1977 at Uljanik Shipyard, SFR Yugoslavia and she was launched in 1978. Ibn Khaldun was commissioned on 20 March 1980.

She was mainly used for training and as transport between Europe and Gulf of Aqaba during Iran–Iraq War. The ship was still operational in 1988, despite several Iranian claims that she had been sunk.

Ibn Khaldun was severely damaged by air attacks while at Basra in February 1991 as the result of Operation Desert Storm. The ship was later renamed to Ibn Marjid. Ibn Marjid survived the Gulf War, but her overall condition was deteriorating and she lacked spare parts for her Roll-Royce engines. She was able to sailed briefly in March 2003 during the U.S. invasion of Iraq, but later was sunk at harbor by air attacks.

== See also ==
- Soldati-class frigate
- KRI Ki Hajar Dewantara

== Bibliography ==
- Baker, A.D. III (1990). Combat Fleets of the World 1990/1991: Their Ships, Aircraft, and Systems. Annapolis, Maryland, US: Naval Institute Press. ISBN 0-87021-250-8.
- Baker, A.D. III (1995). Combat Fleets of the World 1995: Their Ships, Aircraft, and Systems. Annapolis, Maryland, US: Naval Institute Press. ISBN 1-55750-109-2.
- Gardiner, Robert; Chumbley, Stephen; Budzbon, Przemysław (1995). Conway's All the World's Fighting Ships 1947-1995. Annapolis, Maryland: Naval Institute Press. ISBN 978-1-55750-132-5.
- Sharpe, Capt. Richard (1989). Jane's Fighting Ships 1989-90. Jane's Information Group. ISBN 978-0-7106-0886-4.
- Wertheim, Eric (2005). Combat Fleets of the World 2005–2006: Their Ships, Aircraft, and Systems. Annapolis, Maryland, US: Naval Institute Press. ISBN 1-59114-934-7.
