= List of museum ships =

This list of museum ships is a sortable, annotated list of notable museum ships around the world. This includes "ships preserved in museums" defined broadly but is intended to be limited to substantial (large) ships or, in a few cases, very notable boats or dugout canoes or the like. This list does not include submarines; see List of submarine museums for those. This includes ships currently or formerly serving as museums or preserved at museums. This includes ships on static display or floating and perhaps sometimes used for excursions. It includes only genuine historic ships; replica ships, some associated with museums, are listed separately in the List of ship replicas.

Some historic ships actively used for excursions, and not previously or currently associated with museums, are included in the list of classic vessels. For shipwrecks that may be visited by diving, including some perhaps associated with museums, see List of shipwrecks.

Ships whose coordinates are included below may be seen together in map accessed by clicking on "Map all coordinates using OpenStreetMap" at the right side of this page.

== Africa ==
=== Egypt ===
Ship	Image	Year launched	Origin	Type	Location	Notes
Khufu ship		2500 BC	Ancient Egypt	Solar barge	Grand Egyptian Museum, Giza, Egypt; 29.99370°N 31.11968°E	World's oldest intact ship, dismantled and sealed in a pit beside the Great Pyramid of Giza; was on display at Giza Solar boat museum at the Giza pyramid complex from 1982 to 2021.

=== Nigeria ===
Ship	Image	Year launched	Origin	Type	Location	Notes
NNS Bonny		1954	United Kingdom	Seaward defence boat	Nigerian War Museum, Umuahia, Nigeria; 5.54484°N 7.48678°E	Originally built for the Royal Navy as HMS Gifford. Sold to Nigeria in 1968, and served in the Nigerian Civil War against Biafra.

=== South Africa ===
Ship	Image	Year launched	Origin	Type	Location	Notes
NCS Challenger		1991			Port Natal Maritime Museum, Durban, South Africa	Only open boat sailed around the world by a single person (Anthony Steward, during 1991–93)
SAS Durban		1957	United Kingdom	Minesweeper	Port Natal Maritime Museum, Durban, South Africa; 29.86225°S 31.02892°E	First ship built for the South African Navy. Sank at its moorings in 2020, raised in 2021, sank again in 2022, and likely to be scrapped. Still at the museum as of 2023.
J.R. More		1961	United Kingdom	Steam tug	Port Natal Maritime Museum, Durban, South Africa; 29.86201°S 31.02890°E	
Ulundi		1927	Union of South Africa	Steam tug	Port Natal Maritime Museum, Durban, South Africa; 29.86201°S 31.02891°E	Coal-fired steam powered tug, the oldest surviving pilot tug in South Africa

== Asia ==
=== Azerbaijan ===
Ship	Image	Year launched	Origin	Type	Location	Notes
Suraxani		1957	Azerbaijan	Tanker	Baku, Azerbaijan	

=== Brunei ===
Ship	Image	Year launched	Origin	Type	Location	Notes
KDB Maharajalela		1965	Brunei	Patrol boat	Royal Brunei Armed Forces Museum, Bolkiah Garrison, Jalan Pertahanan, Bandar Seri Begawan, Brunei; 4.92743°N 114.93643°E	P22

=== China ===
Ship	Image	Year launched	Origin	Type	Location	Notes
Alexander Grantham		1953	British Hong Kong	Fireboat	Quarry Bay Park, Hong Kong, China; 22.28925°N 114.219264°E	
Anshan		1941	Soviet Union	Destroyer	Chinese Naval Museum Qingdao, Qingdao, Shandong, China; 36.05404°N 120.32136°E	Former Rekordny
Changchun (103)		1940	Soviet Union	Destroyer	Rushan, Shandong, China; 36.80869°N 121.63008°E	Former Reshitelny
Changzhi (519)		1979	China	Frigate	Zhangjiatai Pier, Rizhao, China 35.45703°N 119.5961°E	Not open to public
Chongqing (133)		1980	China	Destroyer	Tianjin Binhai Theme Park, Tianjin; 39.15570°N 117.81312°E	
Dalian (110)		1981	China	Destroyer	Liugong Island Ferry Terminal, Weihai; 37.49388°N 122.13453°E	
Hongzehu (881)		1979	China	Replenishment oiler	Taizhou Naval Museum, Taizhou, Jiangsu, China	
Huimin(619)		1977	China	Corvette	Renjiatai Resort, Rizhao, China; 35.50652°N 119.61723°E	
Ji'an(518)		1978	China	Frigate	Wuxue Binjiang Park National Defense Education Base, Wuxue, China; 29.842683°N 115.543195°E	
Jinan (105)		1970	China	Destroyer	Chinese Naval Museum Qingdao, Qingdao, China; 36.05485°N 120.32107°E	
Jinhua (534)		1982	China	Frigate	Hengdian World Studios, Dongyang, Jinhua, China; 29.17645°N 120.31890°E	
Jiujiang(516)		1975	China	Frigate	Destroyer Jiujiang Military Theme Park, Hukou, Jiujiang, China; 29.74995°N 116.2197°E	Original name is Changsha. Rename Jiujiang in 1981.; Open to public on 1 August 2019.
Kiev		1980	Soviet Union	Aircraft carrier	Tianjin Binhai Theme Park, Tianjin, China; 39.15528°N 117.80833°E	
Lüshun (544)		1985	China	Frigate	Xingguo, China; 26.367583°N 115.336195°E	Original Name is Siping, Rename Lüshun in 2010; Maybe not open to public
Minghua		1962	France	Ocean liner	Minghua Sea World Plaza, China; 22.48639°N 113.91167°E	Former MS Ancerville
Minsk		1975	Soviet Union	Aircraft carrier	Jiangsu, China; 31°48′14.25″N 120°59′25.41″E	
Nanchang (163)		1979	China	Destroyer	Nanchang Naval Vessel Theme Park, Nanchang, Jiangxi, China; 28.72177°N 115.88613°E	
Nanhai (772)		1995	China	Corvette	Jieshou Municipal Museum, Shaying River Xuzhai Pier 33.226579°N 115.403005°E	
Nanhui (688)		1985	China	Corvette	Chongqing National Defence Mobilization Training Center, Chongqing, China; 29.49935°N 106.56045°E	Not open to public.; Visited by appointment only
Nanjing (131)		1973	China	Destroyer	Shipu, Xiangshan County, Zhejiang, China; 29.20238°N 121.9476°E	Not open to public.; Plan to become a museum ship
Nanning (162) (Type 051)		1976	China	Destroyer	Fangchenggang, China; 21.61338°N 108.3155°E	Not open to public.; The Nanning(162), which is Type 052D class, launched in 2019, succeed its name and pennant number
Suijiang (837)		1983	China	Minesweeper	Zhoukou National Defence Theme Park, Zhoukou, China; 33.64036°N 114.6838°E	Former name is Wuzhou(853).; The only minesweeper on exhibition in China
Taiyuan (104)		1939	Soviet Union	Destroyer	Dalian Naval Academy; 38.8723861°N 121.6710852°E	Former Retivy
Wuyi (684)		1980	China	Corvette	Sanhe, Feixi County, Hefei, China; 31.52246°N 117.25213°E	
Xi'an (106)		1970	China	Destroyer	Wuhan Science and Technology Museum, Wuhan, China; 30.57956°N 114.2960°E	Not open to public.; Belong to PLA Naval University of Engineering
Xiamen (515)		1975	China	Frigate	Taizhou Naval Museum, Taizhou, Jiangsu, China; 32.24532°N 119.89169°E	
Xi'ning (108)		1978	China	Destroyer	Taizhou Naval Museum, Taizhou, Jiangsu, China; 32.24528°N 119.89186°E	
Xingguo (742)		1986	China	Corvette	Minyue Island, Qiqiha'er China; 47.39442°N 123.91645°E	
Yinchuan (107)		1970	China	Destroyer	Yellow River Military Cultural Expo Park, Yinchuan, Ningxia, China; 38.39778°N 106.48547°E	
Yintan (531)		1971	China	Frigate	Chinese Naval Museum Qingdao, Qingdao, China; 36.05463°N 120.32102°E	
SS Zhongshan		1913	(Taiwan) Republic of China	Gunboat	Zhongshan Warship Museum, Jiangxia District, Wuhan, Hubei, China; 30.34833°N 114.12944°E	Carried Sun Yat-sen and Chiang Kai-shek in 1922
Zhuhai (166)		1990	China	Destroyer	Chongqing Jianchuan Museum, Chongqing, China; 29.518101°N 106.527255°E	

Former

Ship	Image	Country of preservation	Region of preservation	City of preservation	From	Year launched	Type	Fate	Remarks
Dabie Shan		China	Shandong	Qingdao, China	United States	1944	Landing Ship, Tank	Dismantled between 2005 and 2007	Formerly USS LST-1008
Nanchong (502)		China	Shandong	Qingdao, China	China	1966	Frigate	Scrapped in 2012	
Ningming (679)		China	Hunan	Xiangtan, China	China	1979	Corvette	Unknown, last seen in Baishazhou, Yisuhe town, Xiangtan	Carried Deng Xiaoping during his 1992 Southern Tour
Yanjin (608)		China	Hubei	Huangshi, China	China	1971	Corvette	Scrapped	

=== India ===
Ship	Image	Year launched	Origin	Type	Location	Notes
INS Chamak		1976	India	Missile boat	Pune, Maharashtra	
INS Chapal		1976	India	Missile boat	Rabindranath Tagore Beach, Karwar, Karnataka, India; 14.81436°N 74.12706°E	
INS Chatak		1977	India	Missile boat	INS Venduruthy, Willingdon Island, Kochi, Kerala, India; 9.95381°N 76.280873°E	
INS Khukri		1986	India	Corvette	Diu, India; 9.95381°N 76.280873°E	-

Former

Ship	Image	Country of preservation	Region of preservation	City of preservation	From	Year launched	Type	Fate	Remarks
INS Vikrant		India	Maharashtra	Mumbai	United Kingdom	1945	Aircraft carrier	Closed in 2012, scrapped in 2014	

=== Indonesia ===
Ship	Image	Year launched	Origin	Type	Location	Notes
MV Doulos Phos		1914	United States	Ocean liner	Bintan, Indonesia; 1.16092°N 104.31621°E	Opened as a hotel and museum in 2019
KRI Harimau		1959	Indonesia	Fast attack craft	Purna Bhakti Pertiwi Museum, Taman Mini Indonesia Indah, Jakarta, Indonesia	

=== Israel ===
Ship	Image	Year launched	Origin	Type	Location	Notes
INS Af Al Pi Chen		1942	United Kingdom	Landing craft tank	Clandestine Immigration and Naval Museum, Haifa, Israel; 32.83011°N 34.97079°E	Former HMS LCT 147
INS Dabur		1970	Israel	Patrol boat	Clandestine Immigration and Naval Museum, Haifa, Israel	
INS Mivtach		1967	Israel	Missile boat	Clandestine Immigration and Naval Museum, Haifa, Israel	

=== Japan ===
Ship	Image	Year launched	Origin	Type	Location	Notes
Changyu 3705		c.1990	North Korea	Spy ship	Japan Coast Guard Museum Yokohama, Kanagawa; 35.454306°N 139.644306°E	North Korean spy ship disguised as a fishing trawler, sunk by Japan Coast Guard in 2001.
Daigo Fukuryū Maru		1947	Japan	Fishing boat	Yumenoshima Park, Tokyo; 35.6510°N 139.8263°E	
Fuji		1965	Japan	Icebreaker	Nagoya; 35.0906580°N 136.8805070°E	
Hakkoda Maru		1964	Japan	Train ferry	Aomori; 40.831611°N 140.736389°E	
Hikawa Maru		1929	(Empire of Japan) Japanese Empire	Ocean Liner	Yokohama; 35.44671°N 139.65126°E	
Kaiwo Maru		1930	(Empire of Japan) Japanese Empire	Sail Training ship	Imizu; 36.780125°N 137.110090°E	
Mashu Maru		1965	Japan	Train ferry	Hakodate, Hokkaido; 41.77291°N 140.72179°E	
Meiji Maru		1873	United Kingdom	Lighthouse tender	Tokyo University of Marine Science and Technology, Tokyo; 35.6674°N 139.7903°E	
Mikasa		1900	United Kingdom	Pre-dreadnought	Mikasa Park, Yokusuka; 35.285°N 139.674°E	Flagship at 1905 Battle of Tsushima, last pre-dreadnought battleship in existence
Nippon Maru		1930	(Empire of Japan) Japanese Empire	Sail training ship	Nippon Maru Memorial Park, Yokohama, Kanagawa; 35.4537°N 139.6323°E	
Sōya		1938	(Empire of Japan) Japanese Empire	Icebreaker	Museum of Maritime Science, Tokyo; 35.61906°N 139.77365°E	
Unyo Maru		1909	(Empire of Japan) Japanese Empire	Sailing ship	Tokyo University of Marine Science and Technology, Tokyo; 35.625131°N 139.749172°E	

Former

Ship	Image	Country of preservation	Region of preservation	City of preservation	From	Year launched	Type	Fate	Remarks
Toba Brazil Maru/Hai Shang Cheng Shi		Japan	Mie Prefecture	Toba	Japan	1954	Cargo liner	Tourist attraction in Toba from 1974 to 1996. Tourist attraction in Zhangjiang from 1998. Closed in 2022.	Former Brazil Maru
SS Oriana		Japan	Ōita Prefecture	Beppu	United Kingdom	1959	Ocean liner	Museum ship in Beppu from 1987 to 1995. Floating hotel in Shanghai from 1999 to 2002. Tourist attraction in Dalian from 2002 to 2004. Damaged in a storm in 2004, scrapped in 2005.	Was known as “The Queen of the Sea”
Okinoshima		Japan	Fukuoka	Tsuyazaki	Russian Empire (Russia)	1896	Coastal defense ship	Scrapped in 1939 after being damaged by storms	Former General-Admiral Apraksin
Shiga		Japanese Empire	Kantō region	Chiba	Japan	1945	Kaibōkan	Scrapped in 1998	
Yamato 1		Japan	Kansai region	Kobe	Japan	1991	Experimental ship	Preserved at Kobe Maritime Museum until scrapped in 2016	
Yōtei Maru		Japan	Kantō region	Tokyo	Japan	1965	Train ferry	Scrapped 2012–2013	

=== Kuwait ===
The Kuwaiti Maritime Museum in Salmiya, Kuwait, holds replicas of a number of different types of dhows. The Al-Hashemi-II (1997–2001), in Kuwait City, Kuwait, was recognized by Guinness World Records as the largest wooden dhow ever built; it has never been floated and is used for events. These do not seem to qualify as historic ships preserved in museums so they are not listed here.

=== Mauritius ===
Ship	Image	Year launched	Origin	Type	Location	Notes
Admiral Nevelskoi		1982	Soviet Union	Yacht	Admiral Nevelskoi Maritime Museum; Avenue Surath, Quatre-Bornes, Mauritius	

=== Malaysia ===
Ship	Image	Year launched	Origin	Type	Location	Notes
KD Hang Tuah		1966	United Kingdom	Frigate	RMN Lumut Naval Base	Former HMS Mermaid
Pulau Pinang		2002	Malaysia	Ferry	Tanjong City Marina, George Town	

Former

Ship	Image	Country of preservation	Region of preservation	City of preservation	From	Year launched	Type	Fate	Remarks
KD Rahmat		Malaysia	Perak	Lumut	Malaysia	1967	Frigate	Sprung a leak in 2018 and later scrapped	

=== Myanmar ===
Ship	Image	Year launched	Origin	Type	Location	Notes
UBS Mayu		1942	United Kingdom	Frigate	Myanmar Naval Training Headquarters, Seikkyi, Myanmar	Former HMS Fal, first flagship of the Burmese Navy

=== North Korea ===
Ship	Image	Year launched	Origin	Type	Location	Notes
USS Pueblo		1944	United States	Technical research ship	Victorious War Museum, Pyongyang, North Korea; 39.04051°N 125.73974°E	Seized by North Korea during the Pueblo incident in 1968
Torpedo Boat No. 21		1933	Soviet Union	Motor torpedo boat	Victorious War Museum, Pyongyang, North Korea	Claimed by North Korea to have sunk USS Baltimore, which is false.

=== Pakistan ===
Ship	Image	Year launched	Origin	Type	Location	Notes
PNS Mujahid		1956	Pakistan	Minesweeper	Pakistan Maritime Museum, Karachi, Pakistan; 24.88621°N 67.09003°E	

=== South Korea ===
Ship	Image	Year launched	Origin	Type	Location	Notes
ROKS Cheonan		1989	South Korea	Corvette	Pyeongtaek Naval Base; 36.99656°N 126.81045°E	Largely recovered after sinking in 2010
ROKS Hwa San		1945	United States	Landing Ship, Tank	SapKyoHo National Sightseeing Resort, Dangjin; 36.89134°N 126.82491°E	Former USS Pender County
ROKS Jeonju		1944	United States	Destroyer	SapKyoHo National Sightseeing Resort, Dangjin; 36.8913352°N 126.8251731°E	Former USS Rogers
ROKS Masan		1984	South Korea	Frigate	Ganghwa Island; 37.699602°N 126.383873°E	
ROKS PKM-285		1975	South Korea	Patrol boat	Seoul Battleship Park	
ROKS PKM-357 (replica)		2010	South Korea	Patrol boat	War Memorial of Korea, Seoul	Serves as memorial to the 2002 ROKN PKM-357 sinking
ROKS Seoul		1984	South Korea	Frigate	Seoul Battleship Park; 37.55275°N 126.89741°E	
ROKS Taedong		1943	United States	Frigate	South Korea	Former USS Tacoma
ROKS Ulsan		1980	South Korea	Frigate	Ulsan; 35.501714°N 129.383365°E	
ROKS Wi Bong		1944	United States	Landing Ship, Tank	Jinpo Maritime Theme Park, Gunsan; 35.98966°N 126.71716°E	Former USS LST-849

Former

Ship	Image	Country of preservation	Region of preservation	City of preservation	From	Year launched	Type	Fate	Remarks
ROKS Jeonbuk		South Korea	Gangwon	Gangneung	United States	1945	Destroyer	Land-based museum ship from 1999 to 2021. Scrapped in late 2021.	Former USS Everett F. Larson
ROKS Kang Won		South Korea	Gyeongsangnam-do	Jinhae	United States	1945	Destroyer	Scrapped in 2016–2017	Former USS William R. Rush
ROKS Suyeong		South Korea	Gyeongsangnam-do	Goseong	United States	1944	Landing Ship, Tank	Closed in 2017, returned to the South Korean Navy in 2020	Former USS LST-853

=== Taiwan ===
Ship	Image	Year launched	Origin	Type	Location	Notes
ROCS Te Yang		1945	United States	Destroyer	Anping Port, Tainan, Taiwan; 22.988555°N 120.156338°E	Former USS Sarsfield

=== Thailand ===
Ship	Image	Year launched	Origin	Type	Location	Notes
HTMS Chumphon		1937	Kingdom of Italy	Torpedo boat	Chumphon Province, Thailand	
HTMS Maeklong		1936	(Empire of Japan) Japanese Empire	Corvette	Chulachomklao Fort, Phra Samut Chedi District, Samut Prakan Province, Thailand	
HTMS Pangan		1945	United States	Landing Ship, Tank	Koh Phangan, Thailand	Former USS Stark County
HTMS Pin Klao		1943	United States	Destroyer Escort	Sattahip Naval Base,Sattahip District, Chonburi, Thailand	Former USS Hemminger
HTMS Phutthaloetla Naphalai		1970	United States	Frigate	Sattahip Naval Base, Sattahip District, Chonburi, Thailand	Former USS Ouellet
HTMS Phutthayotfa Chulalok		1973	United States	Frigate	Sattahip Naval Base, Sattahip District, Chonburi, Thailand	Former USS Truett
HTMS Prasae		1943	United States	Frigate	Pak Nam Krasae, Klaeng District, Rayong, Thailand; 12.69694°N 101.70460°E	Former USS Gallup
HTMS Tachin		1943	United States	Frigate	Armed Forces Academies Preparatory School, Nakhon Nayok Province, Thailand	Former USS Glendale

=== Turkey ===
Ship	Image	Year launched	Origin	Type	Location	Notes
TCG Ege		1972	United States	Frigate	İnciraltı Sea Museum, İzmir, Turkey; 38.412500°N 27.034700°E	Former USS Ainsworth
TCG Gayret		1946	United States	Destroyer	Izmit, Turkey; 40.76009°N 29.91677°E	Former USS Eversole
Nusret		1915	Ottoman Empire	Minelayer	Mersin Naval Museum, Tarsus, Mersin Province, Turkey	
Tarihi Kadırga		c. 1575 (Note: Late 16th century)	Ottoman Empire	Galley	Istanbul Naval Museum, Istanbul, Turkey; 41.04167°N 29.00556°E	Owned by Mehmed IV (1648–1687), only surviving galley in the world
TCG Yarhisar		1964	United States	Patrol boat	Gölcük, Kocaeli, Turkey; 40.72335°N 29.83518°E	Former USS PC-1640

=== United Arab Emirates ===
Ship	Image	Year launched	Origin	Type	Location	Notes
Queen Elizabeth 2		1967	United Kingdom	Ocean liner	Mina Rashid, Dubai	Floating hotel and museum.

== Oceania ==
Australia, New Zealand, part of Indonesia and even part of the United States are included in the continent of Oceania, broadly defined. There are no known museum ships in the Oceania part of Indonesia. See List of museum ships in the United States subsection of this "List of museum ships" for the few in Hawaii.

=== Australia ===
Ship	Image	Year launched	Origin	Type	Location	Notes
City of Adelaide		1864	United Kingdom	Clipper	Adelaide, South Australia, Australia; 34.83690°S 138.50907°E	
HMAS Advance		1967	Australia	Patrol boat	Australian National Maritime Museum, Sydney, New South Wales, Australia; 33.86917°S 151.19992°E	
Australia II		1982	Australia	Racing yacht	Western Australian Museum, Boola Bardip, Perth, City of Vincent, Western Australia, Australia	
MV Cape Don		1962	Australia	Lighthouse tender	Balls Head Bay, Waverton, New South Wales, Australia	Associated with South Australian Maritime Museum
Carpentaria		1917	Australia	Lightvessel	Australian National Maritime Museum, Sydney, New South Wales, Australia; 33.868139°S 151.198259°E	
HMAS Castlemaine		1941	Australia	Corvette	Maritime Trust of Australia, Williamstown, Victoria, Australia; 37.8611°S 144.9056°E	
Cheynes IV		1948	Norway	Whaler	Albany's Historic Whaling Station, Albany, Western Australia, Australia	Built in Oslo, Norway, came to Fremantle, Australia in 1948
HMAS Diamantina		1944	Australia	Frigate	Queensland Maritime Museum, Brisbane, Queensland, Australia; 27.48194°S 153.02667°E	
SS Forceful		1925	United Kingdom	Tugboat	Queensland Maritime Museum, Brisbane, Queensland, Australia	Removed from display in 2020 or 2021 and scrapped in 2023
HMAS Gladstone		1984	Australia	Patrol boat	Gladstone Maritime Museum, Gladstone, Queensland, Australia; 23.83317°S 151.25277°E	
MV Krait		1934	(Empire of Japan) Japanese Empire	Trawler	Australian National Maritime Museum, Sydney, New South Wales, Australia	
MV Lady Denman		1912	Australia	Ferry	Jervis Bay Maritime Museum, New South Wales, Australia	
May Queen		1867	Colony of Tasmania	Ketch	Maritime Museum of Tasmania, Sullivans Cove, Hobart, Tasmania, Australia; 42.88272°S 147.33267°E	
MV Nelcebee		1883	South Australia	Auxiliary Schooner	South Australian Maritime Museum, Adelaide, South Australia, Australia	
Polly Woodside		1885	United Kingdom	Barque	South Wharf, Melbourne, Victoria, Australia; 37.82472°S 144.95336°E	
HMAS Townsville		1981	Australia	Patrol boat	Maritime Museum of Townsville, Townsville, Queensland, Australia; 19.25649°S 146.82652°E	
HMAS Vampire		1956	Australia	Destroyer	Australian National Maritime Museum, Sydney, New South Wales, Australia	
Wattle		1933	Australia	Tugboat	Melbourne, Victoria, Australia	
Westward		c.1947		Racing yacht	Maritime Museum of Tasmania, Sullivans Cove, Hobart, Tasmania, Australia	Won 1947 Maria Island Race and 1947 & 1948 Sydney to Hobart Yacht Races
HMAS Whyalla (J153)		1941	Australia	Minesweeper	Whyalla, South Australia, Australia; 33.01931°S 137.57489°E	
Yelta		1948	Australia	Tugboat	South Australian Maritime Museum, Adelaide, South Australia, Australia	

Note there are more in Commons category:Museum ships of Australia, though some may be replicas.

Former

Ship	Image	Preservation location	From	Year launched	Type	Fate	Remarks
Baragoola		Sydney, New South Wales, Australia	Australia	1922	Ferry	Sank at her moorings on January 1, 2022	
Falie			Netherlands	1920	Ketch	Rebuilt in 1982 by government of South Australia, did overnight charters from 1986 until evaluated as not seaworthy in 2005	One of last sail-powered trading vessels in Australian waters

=== New Zealand ===
Ship	Image	Year launched	Origin	Type	Location	Notes
TSS Earnslaw		1912	New Zealand	Twin-screw steamer	Lake Wakatipu, Otago Region, New Zealand; 45°3′S 168°30′E	In active service as a Living museum on Lake Wakatipu
Edwin Fox		1853	British Raj	Barque	Edwin Fox Maritime Centre, Picton, New Zealand; 41°17′6″S 174°0′24″E	
Hikitia		1926	United Kingdom	Steam crane	Wellington, New Zealand	
Lyttelton		1907	United Kingdom	Steam tug	Lyttelton, Canterbury Region, New Zealand	Seaworthy condition
Ongarue		1904			Whanganui, New Zealand	
Waimarie		1900	United Kingdom	Paddle steamer	Whanganui, New Zealand	Seaworthy condition
William C Daldy		1935	United Kingdom	Steam tug	Auckland, New Zealand	Seaworthy condition

Former

Ship	Image	Preservation location	From	Year launched	Type	Fate	Remarks
HMNZS Koura		Paeroa, Waikato, New Zealand	United States	1943	Harbour Defense Motor Launch	Sold December 2007 to a private owner. Now on a trailer at Kopu, Waikato, New Zealand in poor condition.	
HMNZS Manawanui		Paeroa, Waikato, New Zealand	New Zealand	1945	Tugboat	Scrapped at an unknown date	
Rapaki		Auckland, New Zealand	United Kingdom	1925	Steam crane	Towed for scrapping in December 2018	Some parts were given to her sister ship, Hikitia

== South America ==
=== Argentina ===
Ship	Image	Year launched	Origin	Type	Location	Notes
ARA Irigoyen		1944	United States	Fleet Tug	Buque Museo Irigoyen, San Pedro, Buenos Aires, Argentina; 33.66838°S 59.66796°W	Former USS Cahuilla
Lehg II		1934	Argentina	Ketch	Tigre, Buenos Aires, Argentina; 34.41289°S 58.58621°W	Yacht of first solo circumnavigation past the great capes, by Vito Dumas in 1942.
ARA Presidente Sarmiento		1899	United Kingdom	Frigate	ARA Presidente Sarmiento Frigate Museum, Puerto Madero, Argentina; 34.60895°S 58.36564°W	
ARA Uruguay		1874	United Kingdom	Corvette	Puerto Madero, Argentina; 34.60422°S 58.36622°W	

=== Brazil ===
Ship	Image	Year launched	Origin	Type	Location	Notes
Comandante Bauru		1943	United States	Destroyer escort	Brazilian Navy Cultural Center, Rio de Janeiro, Brazil; 22.90031°S 43.17403°W	Former USS McAnn
Laurindo Pitta		1910	United Kingdom	Salvage tug	Brazilian Navy Cultural Center, Rio de Janeiro, Brazil; 22.90037°S 43.17432°W	

=== Chile ===
Ship	Image	Year launched	Origin	Type	Location	Notes
Contramaestre Micalvi		1925	(Weimar Republic) German Reich	Freighter	Puerto Williams, Chile; 54.93514°S 67.61847°W	
Fresia		1964	Chile	Torpedo boat	Embarcadero Tres Puentes, Punta Arenas Naval Base, Punta Arenas, Chile; 53.12283°S 70.86858°W	
Huáscar		1865	United Kingdom	Monitor	Talcahuano, Chile; 36.70541°S 73.11150°W	Was flagship of Peruvian Navy, during the War of the Pacific

Former

Ship	Image	Year launched	Origin	Type	Museum or location	Fate
RAM Poderoso		1911	Chile	Tug	Talcahuano, Chile; 36.71346°S 73.11008°W	Damaged and capsized by the 2010 Chile earthquake and tsunami. Remains on its side in 2023.

=== Colombia ===
Ship	Image	Year launched	Origin	Type	Museum or location	Fate
ARC Cordóba		1944	United States	High-speed transport	Jaime Duque Park, Colombia; 4.94904°N 73.96353°W	Former USS Ruchamkin

=== Ecuador ===
Ship	Image	Year launched	Origin	Type	Museum or location	Fate
BAE Abdón Calderón		1884	United Kingdom	Naval ship	Museo Naval y Buque Calderón, Parque de la Armada, Guayaquil, Ecuador; 2.21543°S 79.88731°W	

=== Paraguay ===
Ship	Image	Year launched	Origin	Type	Museum or location	Fate
ARP Humaitá		1931	Kingdom of Italy	Gunboat	Sajonia, Asunción, Paraguay; 25.29321°S 57.67074°W	Served on Paraguay River in the Chaco War, partly sank and was refloated in 2022

=== Peru ===
Ship	Image	Year launched	Origin	Type	Museum or location	Fate
BAP America		1904	United Kingdom	Gunboat	Historic Boat Museum of Iquitos, Iquitos, Peru; 3.74650°S 73.24140°W	
Yavari		1861	United Kingdom	Steamship	Puno, Peru	Gunboat on Lake Titicaca, oldest lake steamship, became a cruising bed & breakfast

=== Suriname ===
Ship	Image	Year launched	Origin	Type	Museum or location	Fate
Suriname-Rivier		1910	Netherlands	Lightvessel	Fort Nieuw-Amsterdam Open-Air Museum, Suriname; 5.88968°N 55.09132°W	

== North America ==
Includes examples in Canada, Cuba, Mexico, and the United States.

== Europe ==
Technically a few ships on the Istanbul side of the Bosporus and Dardanelles are in Europe, but all of Turkey's museum ships are presented together in the Asia section of this "List of museum ships".

=== Austria ===
Ship	Image	Year launched	Origin	Type	Location	Notes
Niederösterreich (A604)		1969	Austria	Patrol boat	Museum of Military History, Vienna, Austria	Schiffswerft Korneuburg, Korneuburg, Austria

=== Belgium ===
Ship	Year launched	Origin	Type	Location	Notes
Amandine	1962	Belgium	Fishing boat	Ostend, Belgium	
Amical	1914	Belgium	Tugboat	National Maritime Museum of Belgium, Antwerp, Belgium	
Antwerpen 70	1968	Belgium	Tugboat	Antwerp, Belgium	
Mercator	1932	United Kingdom	Barquentine	Ostend, West Flanders, Belgium; 51.22722°N 2.92056°E	
Meuse	1953	Belgium	Patrol boat	Royal Military Museum, Brussels, Belgium	
Oudenaarde	1959	Belgium	Minesweeper	National Maritime Museum of Belgium, Antwerp, Belgium	
Tordino	1922	Netherlands	Spits	Oudenburg, West Flanders, Belgium	

=== Bulgaria ===
Ship	Image	Year launched	Origin	Type	Location	Notes
Drazki		1907	Principality of Bulgaria	Torpedo boat	Varna Naval Museum, Varna, Bulgaria	
Radetzky		1851	Austrian Empire	Steamship	Kozloduy, Bulgaria	Hijacked by poet-revolutionary Hristo Botev in 1876; destroyed; reconstructed with some original pieces in 1918.

=== Croatia ===
Ship	Image	Year launched	Origin	Type	Location	Notes
Galeb		1938	Kingdom of Italy	Presidential yacht	Rijeka, Croatia	
Vridni		1894	Austria-Hungary	Harbor tug	Split, Croatia	

=== Denmark ===
Ship	Image	Year launched	Origin	Type	Location	Notes
Claus Sørensen E.1		1931	Denmark	Fishing vessel	Fisheries and Maritime Museum, Esbjerg, Denmark	
Gedser Rev		1895	Denmark	Lightvessel	National Museum of Denmark, Helsingør, Denmark	
Jylland		1860	Denmark	Screw frigate	Ebeltoft, Denmark	Participated in the 1864 Battle of Heligoland
HDMS Peder Skram		1965	Denmark	Frigate	Copenhagen, Denmark	
HDMS Sehested		1977	Denmark	Fast Attack Craft	Holmen Naval Base, Copenhagen, Denmark	
Skuldelev ships		10th-century	Denmark	Viking ships	Viking Ship Museum, Roskilde, Denmark 55.801°N 12.0584°E	
HDMS Søbjørnen		1964	Denmark	Torpedo boat	Aalborg, Denmark	

Former

Ship	Image	Country of preservation	Region of preservation	City of preservation	From	Year launched	Type	Fate	Remarks
Kong Frederik IX		Denmark	Copenhagen, Denmark	Roskilde, Denmark	Denmark	1954	Ferry	Closed in 2001, scrapped in 2005	
Elbjørn		Denmark	North Jutland, Denmark	Aalborg, Denmark	Denmark	1954	Icebreaker	Sold for scrap in 2019	From 2004 to 2018 it was used as a restaurant, under several owners.

=== Estonia ===
Ship	Image	Year launched	Origin	Type	Location	Notes
Admiral		1956	(Estonian Soviet Socialist Republic) Estonian SSR	Steamship	Estonian Maritime Museum, Tallinn, Estonia	
EML Grif		1976	(Estonian Soviet Socialist Republic) Estonian SSR	Patrol boat	Estonian Maritime Museum, Tallinn, Estonia	
EML Kalev		1966	West Germany	Minesweeper	Estonian Maritime Museum, Tallinn, Estonia; 59.452806°N 24.735455°E	
EML Suurop		1956	Finland	Patrol boat	Estonian Maritime Museum, Tallinn, Estonia	
Suur Tõll		1914	Russian Empire	Icebreaker	Seaplane Harbour, Estonian Maritime Museum, Tallinn, Estonia; 59.4531°N 24.7387°E	
PVL Torm		1966	Norway	Patrol boat	Estonian Maritime Museum, Tallinn, Estonia	
EML Valvas		1943	United States	Buoy tender	Estonian Maritime Museum, Tallinn, Estonia; 59.453151°N 24.735871°E	

Former

Ship	Image	Country of preservation	Region of preservation	City of preservation	From	Year launched	Type	Fate	Remarks
EML Sulev		Estonia	Harjumaa	Tallinn, Estonia	West Germany	1957	Minehunter	Scrapped in 2021, 2022.	Owned by the Estonian War Museum.

=== Finland ===
Ship	Image	Year launched	Origin	Type	Location	Notes
Ahkera		1871	Russian Empire	Steam tug	Savonlinna Provincial Museum, Finland	
MS Bore		1960	Finland	Cruise ship	Forum Marinum, Turku, Finland; 60.435°N 22.2337°E	
FNS Karjala		1968	Finland	Corvette	Forum Marinum, Turku, Finland	
Keihässalmi		1957	Finland	Minelayer	Forum Marinum, Turku, Finland; 60.4356°N 22.2351°E	
Mikko		1914	Russian Empire	Steamship	Savonlinna Provincial Museum, Finland	
Pommern		1903	United Kingdom	Barque	Mariehamn, Åland, Finland; 60.097222°N 19.925278°E	
Salama		1874	Russian Empire	Steamship	Savonlinna Provincial Museum, Finland	
Savonlinna		1904	Russian Empire	Steamship	Savonlinna Provincial Museum, Finland	
Sigyn		1887	Sweden-Norway	Barque	Forum Marinum, Turku, Finland; 60°26′10″N 22°14′14″E	
Suomen Joutsen		1902	France	Full-rigged ship	Turku, Finland; 60.43611°N 22.23694°E	
Tarmo		1907	United Kingdom	Icebreaker	Maritime Museum of Finland, Kotka, Finland	
Tyrsky		1943	Finland	Torpedo boat	Forum Marinum, Turku, Finland	
VMV-11		1935	Finland	Patrol boat	Maritime Museum of Finland, Kotka, Finland	
Wilhelm Carpelan		1915	Russian Empire	Transport boat	Forum Marinum, Turku, Finland; 60.435833°N 22.235788°E	

=== France ===
Ship	Image	Year launched	Origin	Type	Location	Notes
Duchesse Anne		1901	German Empire	Full-rigged ship	Dunkirk, France	
Entreprenant		1965	France	Tugboat	Dunkirk, France	
France I		1958	France	Weather ship	Musée maritime de La Rochelle	
Hémérica		1957	France	Fishing trawler	Musée de la pêche de Concarneau, Concarneau, France	
Joshua		1962	France	Ketch	Musée maritime de La Rochelle, La Rochelle, France	
Maillé-Brézé (D627)		1957	France	Destroyer	Nantes, France; 47°12′24″N 1°34′18″W	
PS Princess Elizabeth		1927	United Kingdom	Paddle steamer	Dunkirk, France	
ST-488		1944	United States	Harbor tug	Le Havre, France; 49.4862°N 0.1245°E	

Former

Ship	Image	Country of preservation	Region of preservation	City of preservation	From	Year launched	Type	Fate	Remarks
Colbert		France	Nouvelle-Aquitaine	Bordeaux	France	1956	Guided missile cruiser	Scrapped in 2016.	

=== Germany ===
Ship	Image	Year launched	Origin	Type	Location	Notes
Altona		1926	Weimar Republic	Payroll barge	Museumshafen Oevelgönne, Germany	
Anna		1910	German Empire	Ketch	Museumshafen Oevelgönne, Germany	
Bergedorf		1955	West Germany	Ferry	Museumshafen Oevelgönne, Germany; 53.5436495°N 9.9147769°E	
MS Bleichen		1958	West Germany	Freighter	Hamburg, Germany; 53.52937°N 9.99866°E	
Bürgermeister Abendroth		1908	German Empire	Lightvessel	German Maritime Museum, Bremerhaven, Germany; 53.54082°N 8.57763°E	
Cap San Diego		1961	West Germany	Freighter	Hamburg, Germany; 53.5431°N 9.9763°E	
Claus D		1913	German Empire	Tugboat	Museumshafen Oevelgönne, Germany; 53.32370°N 9.54546°E	
Deutschland		1927	(Weimar Republic) German Reich	Full-rigged ship	Bremerhaven, Germany; 53.54674°N 8.57206°E	
Elbe 3		1888	German Empire	Lightvessel	Museumshafen Oevelgönne, Germany; 53.54356°N 9.91283°E	
Elfriede		1904	German Empire	Ewer	Museumshafen Oevelgönne, Germany	
Fiete		1960	West Germany	Mooring boat	Museumshafen Oevelgönne, Germany	
Frieden		1957	East Germany	Cargo ship	Rostock Shipbuilding and Shipping Museum, Rostock, Germany; 54.14333°N 12.08556°E	
Gorch Fock		1933	(Weimar Republic) German Reich	Barque	Stralsund, Germany; 54.31667°N 13.09833°E	School ship
Hafendockter		1929	Weimar Republic	Doctors barge	Museumshafen Oevelgönne, Germany; 53.5438125°N 9.9154375°E	
Hans Beimler		1986	East Germany	Missile corvette	Historical Technical Museum, Peenemünde, Peenemünde, Germany	
Helne		1906	Netherlands	Tjalk	Museumshafen Oevelgönne, Germany	
Hoop Op Welvaart		1883	Netherlands	Tjalk	Museumshafen Oevelgönne, Germany	
Karl Friedrich Steen		1928	Weimar Republic	Floating crane	Museumshafen Oevelgönne, Germany; 53.5434375°N 9.9158125°E	
Mathilda		1912	German Empire	Steam Pinnace	Museumshafen Oevelgönne, Germany	
Moewe		1907	German Empire	Ketch	Museumshafen Oevelgönne, Germany	
Mölders		1967	West Germany	Guided missile destroyer	Wilhelmshaven, Germany	
Ottenstreuer		1958	West Germany	Police boat	Museumshafen Oevelgönne, Germany	
Otto Lauffer		1928	Weimar Republic	Police boat	Museumshafen Oevelgönne, Germany	
Passat		1911	German Empire	Barque	Travemünde, Lübeck, Germany	
Peking		1911	German Empire	Barque	Hamburg, Germany	
Präsident Freiherr Von Maltzahn		1928	Weimar Republic	Sailing cutter	Museumshafen Oevelgönne, Germany	
Präsident Schaefer		1925	Weimar Republic	Customs barge	Museumshafen Oevelgönne, Germany; 53.5439375°N 9.9151875°E	
Rau IX		1939	Nazi Germany	Whaler	German Maritime Museum, Bremerhaven, Germany	
Rickmer Rickmers		1896	German Empire	Barque	Hamburg, Germany	
Silvia		1964	West Germany	Fishing boat	Museumshafen Oevelgönne, Germany	
Smiet Lois		1965	West Germany	Mooring boat	Museumshafen Oevelgönne, Germany	
Sperber		1928	Weimar Republic	Accident boat	Museumshafen Oevelgönne, Germany	
Stralsund		1890	German Empire	Train ferry	Wolgast, Germany	
Stek Ut		1968	West Germany	Mooring boat	Museumshafen Oevelgönne, Germany	
Stettin		1933	(Weimar Republic) German Reich	Icebreaker	Hamburg, Germany	
Stubnitz		1964	East Germany	Factory ship	Hamburg, Germany	
Suhr & Consorten 2		1930	Weimar Republic	Tugboat	Museumshafen Oevelgönne, Germany	
Tiger		1910	German Empire	Tugboat	Museumshafen Oevelgönne, Germany; 53.5436875°N 9.91153125°E	
Weilheim M1077		1958	West Germany	Minesweeper	Wilhelmshaven, Germany	
Woltman		1904	German Empire	Tugboat	Museumshafen Oevelgönne, Germany	

Former

Ship	Image	Country of preservation	Region of preservation	City of preservation	From	Year launched	Type	Fate	Remarks
Kranich P6083		Germany	Lower Saxony	Bremerhaven	Germany	1959	Fast Attack Craft	Scrapped in 2008	
Seute Deern		Germany	Bremen	Bremerhaven	United States	1919	Barque	Scrapped between 2020 and 2021	Served as a restaurant
Georg Büchner		Germany	Mecklenburg-Vorpommern	Rostock	Belgium	1951	Ocean liner	Sank while under tow for scrapping in 2013	Former Charlesville

=== Greece ===
Ship	Image	Year launched	Origin	Type	Location	Notes
Evangelistria			Greece		Aegean Maritime Museum, Mykonos, Greece	
Georgios Averof		1910	Kingdom of Italy	Armored cruiser	Palaio Faliro, Greece; 37.93389°N 23.68361°E	World's only surviving armored cruiser carried the Greek Government in Exile back to Athens in 1944
SS Hellas Liberty		1943	United States	Cargo ship	Piraeus, Greece; 37.94229°N 23.63078°E	Former SS Arthur M. Huddell
Thalis o Milisios		1908	Kingdom of Greece	Cable layer	Palaio Faliro, Greece	
HNS Velos		1942	United States	Destroyer	Palaio Faliro, Greece; 37.93417°N 23.68472°E	Former USS Charrette

=== Hungary ===
Ship	Image	Year launched	Origin	Type	Location	Notes
FK 312		1872	Austria-Hungary	Tugboat	Balatonboglár, Hungary	
Kossuth		1913	Austria-Hungary	Paddle steamer	Kossuth Museumship, Közlekedési Múzeum, Budapest, Hungary	
SMS Leitha		1871	Austria-Hungary	Monitor	Budapest, Hungary; 47.50871°N 19.04478°E	First river monitor in Europe; served in World War I

=== Iceland ===
Ship	Image	Year launched	Origin	Type	Museum or location
ICGV Óðinn		1959	Iceland	Offshore patrol vessel	Vikin Maritime Museum, Reykjavík, Iceland

=== Ireland ===
Ship	Image	Year launched	Origin	Type	Location	Notes
Lurgan Canoe		2000 BC	(Republic of Ireland) Ireland	Dugout canoe	National Museum of Ireland, Dublin, Ireland	Longest dugout canoe ever found, from the early Bronze Age
Asgard (yacht)		1905	(Republic of Ireland) Ireland	Yacht	Dublin, Ireland	Howth gun-runner in 1914

=== Italy ===
Ship	Image	Year launched	Origin	Type	Location	Notes
SS Conte Biancamano		1925	Kingdom of Italy	Ocean liner	Museo Nazionale Scienza e Tecnologia Leonardo da Vinci, Milan, Italy	
Ebe		1921	Kingdom of Italy	Barquentine	Museo Nazionale Scienza e Tecnologia Leonardo da Vinci, Milan, Italy	
MAS 15		1916	Kingdom of Italy	Torpedo boat	Vittoriano, Rome, Italy	
MAS 96		1917	Kingdom of Italy	Torpedo boat	Vittoriale degli italiani, Italy	
MS 472		1942	Kingdom of Italy	Motor torpedo boat	Marina di Ravenna, Italy	
MS 473		1942	Kingdom of Italy	Motor torpedo boat	Museo Storico Navale, Venice, Italy	
MZ 737		1942	Kingdom of Italy	Motozattera	Venetian Arsenal, Venice, Italy	
Pietro Micca		1895	Kingdom of Italy	Tugboat	Fiumicino, Italy	
Puglia		1898	Kingdom of Italy	Protected cruiser	Vittoriale degli italiani, Italy	Only the bow is preserved

Former

Ship	Image	Year	Type	Location	Notes	Fate
Nemi ships		1st century AD	Barges	Lake Nemi	Caligula's Roman ships	Destroyed by fire in 1944

=== Lithuania ===
Ship	Image	Year launched	Origin	Type	Location	Notes
LKL Sūduvis (M52)		1957	West Germany	Minehunter	Klaipeda, Lithuania; 55.7089958°N 21.1294553°E	Former Koblenz (M1071)

=== Malta ===
Ship	Image	Year launched	Origin	Type	Location	Notes
P23		1967	United States	Patrol boat	Hay Wharf, AFM Base, off Qala, Gozo, Malta	Former USS PCF 813

=== Netherlands ===
Ship	Image	Year launched	Origin	Type	Location	Notes
HNLMS Abraham Crijnssen		1936	Netherlands	Minesweeper	Dutch Navy Museum, Den Helder, Netherlands; 52.96389°N 4.77083°E	
HNLMS Bonaire		1877	Netherlands	Frigate	Dutch Navy Museum, Den Helder, Netherlands; 52.961079°N 4.770046°E	
HNLMS Buffel		1868	Netherlands	Ironclad Ram	Maritime Museum of Rotterdam, Rotterdam, Netherlands; 51.829014°N 4.128711°E	
MLV Castor		1950	Netherlands	Pilot vessel	Rotterdam, Netherlands	
Christiaan Brunings		1900	Netherlands	Icebreaker	Nederlands Scheepvaartmuseum, Amsterdam, Netherlands	
De Meern 1		148	Roman Empire	Barge	De Meern, Netherlands	
Elbe		1959	Netherlands	Oceangoing tug	Maassluis, Netherlands 51.916617°N 4.246980°E	
HMS Elfin		1933	United Kingdom	Submarine tender	Wormerveer, Netherlands; 52.486455°N 4.80816°E	
Holland		1951	Netherlands	Tugboat	Terschelling, Netherlands	
Hudson		1939	Netherlands	Tugboat	Maassluis, Netherlands	
HNLMS Mercuur		1953	United States	Minesweeper	Vlissingen, Netherlands; 51.44454°N 3.57952°E	
SS Rotterdam		1958	Netherlands	Ocean Liner	Rotterdam, Netherlands	
HNLMS Schorpioen		1868	Netherlands	Monitor	Dutch Navy Museum, Den Helder, Netherlands	
Zeemeeuw		1937	Netherlands	Coastal trading vessel	Maritime Museum Rotterdam, Rotterdam, Netherlands	

=== Norway ===
Ship	Image	Year launched	Origin	Type	Museum or location	Notes
HNoMS Alta		1953	United States	Minesweeper	Royal Norwegian Navy Museum; Horten, Norway; 59.90913°N 10.73433°E	
Anna Karoline		1876	Sweden-Norway	Jekt	Nordland Museum, Norway; 67.26806°N 14.42611°E	
SS Bjoren		1866	Sweden-Norway	Steamboat	Norway	In active service as a Living museum
HNoMS Blink		1965	Norway	Patrol boat	Royal Norwegian Navy Museum; Horten, Norway; 59.426°N 10.48672°E	
MS Finnmarken		1956	Norway	Coastal trading vessel	Norwegian Coastal Express Museum, Norway	
Fram		1892	Sweden-Norway	Schooner	Fram Museum, Oslo, Norway	
Gjøa		1872	Sweden-Norway	Sloop	Fram Museum, Oslo, Norway	
Gokstad ship		9th century	Norway	Viking ship	Viking Ship Museum, Oslo, Norway	
MV Heland (M5V)		1937	Norway	Fishing boat		Shetland bus
SS Hestmanden		1911	Norway	Cargo ship		
Kon-Tiki		1947	Peru	Raft	Kon-Tiki Museum, Oslo, Norway	
HSwMS Najaden		1897	Sweden-Norway	Full-rigged ship	Fredrikstad, Norway	
HNoMS Narvik		1965	Norway	Frigate	Royal Norwegian Navy Museum; Horten, Norway	
Oseberg ship		9th century	Norway	Viking ship	Viking Ship Museum, Oslo, Norway	
HNoMS Rap		1873	Sweden-Norway	Torpedo boat	Royal Norwegian Navy Museum; Horten, Norway	
HNoMS Skrei		1965	Norway	Motor torpedo boat	Royal Norwegian Navy Museum; Horten, Norway	
Southern Actor		1950	United Kingdom	Whale catcher	Sandefjord Museum, Sandefjord, Norway	
Tune Ship		c. 900	Norway	Viking ship	Viking Ship Museum, Oslo, Norway	
MV Vita		1939	Norway	Shetland bus	Kystmuseet i Sør-Trøndelag	

=== Poland ===
Ship	Image	Year launched	Origin	Type	Location	Notes
ORP Batory		1932	Poland	Patrol boat	Gdynia, Poland; 54.51571°N 18.54783°E	
ORP Błyskawica		1936	United Kingdom	Destroyer	Gdynia, Poland; 54.51952°N 18.55118°E	
Dar Pomorza		1909	German Empire	Full-rigged ship	Gdynia, Poland; 54.519480°N 18.552871°E	
ORP Fala		1965	(Poland) Polish People's Republic	Patrol craft	Museum of Polish Arms, Kołobrzeg, Poland; 54.177442°N 15.559756°E	
Kuna		1884	German Empire	River icebreaker	Gorzów Wielkopolski; 52.724385°N 15.255476°E	
SS Sołdek		1949	Polish People's Republic	Freighter	National Maritime Museum, Gdańsk, Poland; 54.351389°N 18.658889°E	
ORP Władysławowo		1975	(Poland) Polish People's Republic	Missile boat	Museum of Polish Arms, Kołobrzeg, Poland; 54.177119°N 15.560499°E	

Former

Ship	Image	Country of preservation	Region of preservation	City of preservation	From	Year launched	Type	Fate	Remarks
ORP Burza		Poland	Pomeranian Voivodeship	Gdynia, Poland	France	1929	Destroyer	Scrapped in 1977	

=== Portugal ===
Ship	Image	Year launched	Origin	Type	Location	Notes
Dom Fernando II e Glória		1843	Kingdom of Portugal	Frigate	Cacilhas, Almada, Portugal; 38.686603°N 9.146154°W	
Gil Eannes		1955	Portugal	Hospital ship	Viana do Castelo, Portugal; 41.6901°N 8.8304°W	
Santo André		1948	Netherlands	Trawler	Aveiro, Portugal; 40.641407°N 8.730226°W	Museum vessel since 2001

=== Russia ===
Ship	Image	Year launched	Origin	Type	Location	Notes
Angara		1900	Russian Empire	Icebreaker	Angara Icebreaker Museum, Irkutsk, Russia; 52°15′00″N 104°20′38″E	
Aurora		1900	Russian Empire	Protected cruiser	Central Naval Museum, St. Petersburg, Russia; 59.95528°N 30.33806°E	one of only two surviving warships from the Battle of Tsushima a shot from the warship was fired to signal the start of the October Revolution
Bespokoynyy		1990	Soviet Union	Destroyer	Kronstadt, Russia; 59.98381°N 29.76091°E	
Fortuna		1689	(Tsardom of Russia) Russia	Miniature warship	Boat of Peter I (museum-estate), Pereslavl-Zalessky; 56.7238°N 38.7735°E	
Irbenskiy		1962	Soviet Union	Lightvessel	Museum of the World Ocean, Kaliningrad; 54.706063°N 20.503514°E	
Kosmonavt Viktor Patsayev		1968	Soviet Union	Research Vessel	Museum of the World Ocean, Kaliningrad, Russia; 54.706293°N 20.497627°E	
Krasin		1917	Russian Empire	Icebreaker	St. Petersburg, Russia; 59.927778°N 30.268889°E	
Krasnyy Vympel		1911	Russian Empire	Armed yacht	Vladivostok; 43.112570°N 131.890567°E	
Lenin		1957	Soviet Union	Icebreaker	Murmansk, Russia; 68.974717°N 33.058947°E	
Mikhail Kutuzov		1952	Soviet Union	Cruiser	Novorossiysk, Russia; 44.721111°N 37.781944°E	
Smetlivy		1966	Soviet Union	Destroyer	Sevastopol, Russia; 44.612833°N 33.529528°E	
SRT-129		1951	East Germany	Fishing trawler	Museum of the World Ocean, Kaliningrad, Russia; 54.706087°N 20.504274°E	
St. Nicholas		1645 (Note: Exact date unknown, estimated to be sometime in the 1640s.)	England or (Tsardom of Russia) Russia	Miniature warship	Central Naval Museum, St. Petersburg, Russia; 59.92967°N 30.29397°E	
Svyatitel Nicolay		1886	Russian Empire	Paddle steamer	Krasnoyarsk, Russia; 56.010578°N 92.895041°E	
Vityaz		1939	Nazi Germany	Research vessel	Museum of the World Ocean, Kaliningrad, Russia; 54.706175°N 20.499790°E	

Former

Ship	Image	Country of preservation	Region of preservation	City of preservation	From	Year launched	Type	Fate	Remarks
Tver		Soviet Union	Republic of Tatarstan	Kazan, Soviet Union	Russian Empire	1767	Galley	Destroyed by fire in 1956	

=== Serbia ===
Ship	Image	Year launched	Origin	Type	Museum or location	Remarks
Yugoslav monitor Sava		1904	Austria-Hungary	Monitor	Belgrade	Fired the first shots of World War I

=== Spain ===
Ship	Image	Year launched	Origin	Type	Museum or location
Hidria Segundo		1966	Spain	Cargo ship	Vigo, Pontevedra, Spain
La Palma		1912	Kingdom of Spain	Steamship	Santa Cruz de Tenerife, Canary Islands, Spain

=== Sweden ===
Ship	Image	Year launched	Origin	Type	Location	Remarks
HSwMS Bremön		1940	Sweden	Minesweeper	Marinmuseum, Karlskrona, Sweden	
Dan Broström		1963	Sweden	Port ferry	Maritiman, Gothenburg, Sweden	
ESAB IV		1920	Sweden	Repair ship	Maritiman, Gothenburg, Sweden	
Finngrundet		1903	Sweden-Norway	Lightvessel	Vasa Museum, Stockholm, Sweden	
Fladen		1915	Sweden	Lightvessel	Maritiman, Gothenburg, Sweden	
Flodsprutan II		1931	Sweden	Fireboat	Maritiman, Gothenburg, Sweden	
Fryken		1938	Sweden	Coastal trading vessel	Maritiman, Gothenburg, Sweden	
Herkules		1939	Sweden	Tugboat	Maritiman, Gothenburg, Sweden	
HSwMS Hugin		1978	Sweden	Patrol boat	Maritiman, Gothenburg, Sweden	
Jarramas		1900	Sweden–Norway	Tall ship	Marinmuseum, Karlskrona, Sweden	
HSwMS Kalmarsund		1953	Sweden	Minelayer	Maritiman, Gothenburg, Sweden	
HSwMS M20		1941	Sweden	Minesweeper	Sweden	
SS Orion		1929	Sweden	Pilot ship	Stockholm, Sweden	
SS Sankt Erik		1915	Sweden	Icebreaker	Stockholm, Sweden	
HSwMS Småland		1956	Sweden	Destroyer	Maritiman, Gothenburg, Sweden	
HMS Spica		1966	Sweden	Torpedo boat	Vasa Museum, Stockholm, Sweden	
MS Stormprincess		1908	Sweden-Norway	Tugboat	Maritiman, Gothenburg, Sweden	
HSwMS Sölve		1875	Sweden-Norway	Monitor	Maritiman, Gothenburg, Sweden	
T38		1951	Sweden	Motor torpedo boat	Marinmuseum, Karlskrona, Sweden	
Vasa		1628	(Sweden) Swedish Empire	Galleon ship of the line	Vasa Museum, Stockholm, Sweden	Salvaged in 1961
HSwMS Västervik		1974	Sweden	Missile boat	Marinmuseum, Karlskrona, Sweden	

=== United Kingdom ===
Ship	Image	Year launched	Origin	Type	Location	Notes
Arctic Corsair		1960	United Kingdom	Trawler	Kingston upon Hull, United Kingdom; 53.74278°N 0.32778°W	
Auld Reekie		1943	United Kingdom	Clyde puffer	Inverary Maritime Museum, Inverary, Scotland	
Basuto		1902	United Kingdom	Clyde puffer	National Waterways Museum, Ellesmere Port, United Kingdom	
HMS Belfast		1938	United Kingdom	Light cruiser	Imperial War Museum, London, United Kingdom; 51.50667°N 0.08139°W	
RNLB Alfred Corry (ON 353)		1894	United Kingdom	Lifeboat	Alfred Corry Lifeboat Museum, Southwold, United Kingdom	
HMY Britannia		1953	United Kingdom	Royal yacht	Ocean Terminal, Leith, Edinburgh, United Kingdom; 55.98216°N 3.17729°W	
Brocklebank		1964	United Kingdom	Tug	Merseyside Maritime Museum, Liverpool, United Kingdom	
LV 78 Calshot Spit		1914	United Kingdom	Lightvessel	Solent Sky, Southampton, United Kingdom; 50.89795°N 1.39266°W	
Canning		1954	United Kingdom	Tug	Swansea Museum, Swansea, United Kingdom	
HMS Caroline		1914	United Kingdom	Cruiser	Belfast, Northern Ireland, United Kingdom	
SY Carola		1898	United Kingdom	Steam Yacht	Scottish Maritime Museum, Irvine, United Kingdom	
HMS Cavalier		1943	United Kingdom	Destroyer	Chatham Historic Dockyard, Chatham, United Kingdom	
ST Cervia		1945	United Kingdom	Tug	East Kent Maritime Museum, Ramsgate, United Kingdom	
HM CMB 4		1916	United Kingdom	Coastal Motor Boat	Imperial War Museum, Duxford, United Kingdom	
HM CMB 9		1916	United Kingdom	Coastal Motor Boat	Avonmouth, Bristol, United Kingdom	
HM CMB 103		1921	United Kingdom	Coastal Motor Boat	Chatham Historic Dockyard, Chatham, United Kingdom	
Cutty Sark		1869	United Kingdom	Clipper	Greenwich, London, United Kingdom	
RRS Discovery		1901	United Kingdom	Barque	Dundee, United Kingdom	
Dover Bronze Age Boat		1500 BC	Prehistoric Britain	Seagoing boat	Dover Museum, Dover, United Kingdom	Preserved remains of a Bronze Age sewn plank boat
MV Edmund Gardner		1953	United Kingdom	Pilot boat	Merseyside Maritime Museum, Liverpool, United Kingdom	
SS Explorer		1955	United Kingdom	Research vessel	Leith, Edinburgh, United Kingdom	
RNLB Foresters Centenary		1936	United Kingdom	Lifeboat	The Mo Sheringham Museum, Sheringham, United Kingdom	
MB Fountain		1952	United Kingdom	Bunkering vessel	Essex, United Kingdom	
HMS Gannet		1878	United Kingdom	Sloop	Chatham Historic Dockyard, Chatham, United Kingdom	
Garlandstone		1903	United Kingdom	Tamar ketch	Morwellham Quay, United Kingdom	
Garnock		1956	United Kingdom	Tugboat	Scottish Maritime Museum, Irvine, United Kingdom	
Glenlee		1872	United Kingdom	Barque	Riverside Museum, Glasgow, United Kingdom	
SS Great Britain		1843	United Kingdom	Steamship	Bristol Harbour, Bristol, United Kingdom	
Helwick		1937	United Kingdom	Lightvessel	Swansea Museum, Swansea, United Kingdom	
RNLB H F Bailey		1935	United Kingdom	Lifeboat	RNLI Henry Blogg Museum, Cromer, United Kingdom	
HSL 102		1936	United Kingdom	High-speed launch	Portsmouth Historic Dockyard, Portsmouth, United Kingdom	
James Caird		1912	United Kingdom	Whaleboat	Dulwich College, London, United Kingdom	
RNLB Jesse Lumb		1939	United Kingdom	Lifeboat	Imperial War Museum, Duxford, United Kingdom	
John H Amos		1931	United Kingdom	tugboat	Chatham Historic Dockyard, Chatham, United Kingdom	
John King		1935	United Kingdom	tugboat	M Shed, Bristol, United Kingdom	
Knocker White		1924	Netherlands	Tugboat	Trinity Buoy Wharf, London, United Kingdom; 51.507451°N 0.008131°E	
HMS LCT (3) 7074		1945	United Kingdom	Landing craft tank	The D-Day Story, Portsmouth, United Kingdom	
RNLB Lucy Lavers		1940	United Kingdom	Lifeboat	Wells-next-the-Sea, United Kingdom	
LV21		1963	United Kingdom	Lightvessel	Gravesend, United Kingdom	
Lydia Eva		1930	United Kingdom	Drifter	Great Yarmouth, United Kingdom	
HMS M33		1915	United Kingdom	Monitor	Portsmouth Historic Dockyard, Portsmouth, United Kingdom	
RNLB Manchester Unity of Oddfellows		1961	United Kingdom	Lifeboat	The Mo Sheringham Museum, Sheringham, United Kingdom	
Mary Rose		1511	Kingdom of England	Carrack	Portsmouth Historic Dockyard, Portsmouth, United Kingdom	
Massey Shaw		1935	United Kingdom	Fireboat	West India Docks, London, United Kingdom	
Mayflower		1861	United Kingdom	tugboat	M Shed, Bristol, United Kingdom	
HMS Medusa (A353)		1943	United Kingdom	Patrol boat	Haslar Marina, Gosport, United Kingdom	
PS Medway Queen		1924	United Kingdom	Steamship	Gillingham Pier, United Kingdom	
MGB 81		1942	United Kingdom	Motor gunboat	Portsmouth Historic Dockyard, Portsmouth, United Kingdom	
MTB 71		1942	United Kingdom	Motor torpedo boat	Explosion Museum of Naval Firepower, Gosport, United Kingdom	
MTB 102		1937	United Kingdom	Motor torpedo boat	Lowestoft, United Kingdom	
MTB 331		1941	United Kingdom	Coastal Motor Boat	Explosion Museum of Naval Firepower, Gosport, United Kingdom	
Newport ship		1449	Spain	Trade ship	Newport, United Kingdom	Undergoing conservation
SS Nomadic		1911	United Kingdom	Tender	Belfast, United Kingdom	
Olga		1909	United Kingdom	Pilot Cutter	Swansea Museum, Swansea, United Kingdom	
USN P22		1952	West Germany	Patrol boat	Sandwich, United Kingdom	
LV Penguin		1910	United Kingdom	Lightvessel	Caernarfon, United Kingdom	
Portwey		1927	United Kingdom	Tugboat	West India Docks, London, United Kingdom	
HMS President		1918	United Kingdom	Sloop	Chatham, United Kingdom	
Pyronaut		1934	United Kingdom	Fireboat	M Shed, Bristol, United Kingdom	
TS Queen Mary		1933	United Kingdom	Clyde steamer	Glasgow, United Kingdom	
Queen Mary's Shallop		1689	Kingdom of England	Shallop	National Maritime Museum, Greenwich, London, United Kingdom	
Reaper		1901	United Kingdom	Fifie	Scottish Fisheries Museum, Anstruther, United Kingdom	
SS Robin		1890	United Kingdom	Coastal trading vessel	West India Quay, London, United Kingdom	
Ross Tiger		1957	United Kingdom	Fishing trawler	Grimsby Fishing Heritage Centre, Grimsby, United Kingdom	
RNLB Ruby and Arthur Reed		1966	United Kingdom	Lifeboat	Hythe, United Kingdom	
S-130		1943	Nazi Germany	Fast attack craft	Bideford, United Kingdom	
Spartan		1942	United Kingdom	Clyde puffer	Scottish Maritime Museum, Irvine, United Kingdom	
Spurn Lightship		1927	United Kingdom	Lightvessel	Hull Marina, Kingston upon Hull, United Kingdom	
Sundowner		1912	United Kingdom	Motor yacht	Ramsgate Maritime Museum, Ramsgate, United Kingdom	
Vital Spark		1944	United Kingdom	Clyde puffer	Inverary Maritime Museum, Inveraray, United Kingdom	
HMS Unicorn		1824	United Kingdom	Frigate	Dundee, United Kingdom	
VIC 56		1946	United Kingdom	Clyde Puffer	Chatham Historic Dockyard, Chatham, United Kingdom	
HMS Victory		1765	Great Britain	First-rate ship of the line	Portsmouth Historic Dockyard, Portsmouth, United Kingdom; 50.80194°N 1.10972°W	Only surviving ship of the line
RNLB Thomas McCunn		1933	United Kingdom	Lifeboat	Longhope Lifeboat Museum, Longhope, United Kingdom	
HMS Trincomalee		1817	United Kingdom	Frigate	National Museum of the Royal Navy, Hartlepool, United Kingdom	
Turbinia		1894	United Kingdom	Steamship	Discovery Museum, Newcastle upon Tyne, United Kingdom	
Tamzine		1937	United Kingdom	Fishing boat	Imperial War Museum, London, United Kingdom	
HMS Warrior		1860	United Kingdom	Armored Frigate	Portsmouth Historic Dockyard, Portsmouth, United Kingdom	
HMS Wilton		1972	United Kingdom	Minesweeper	Leigh-on-Sea, United Kingdom	
PS Wingfield Castle		1934	United Kingdom	Paddle steamer	National Museum of the Royal Navy, Hartlepool, United Kingdom	
Zetland		1802	United Kingdom	Lifeboat	Zetland Lifeboat Museum, Redcar, United Kingdom	Oldest surviving lifeboat in the world

Former

Ship	Image	Country of preservation	Region of preservation	City of preservation	From	Year launched	Type	Fate	Remarks
HMS Bronington		United Kingdom	England	Birkenhead, United Kingdom	United Kingdom	1953	Minesweeper	Sank at its moorings in 2016	
TSS T/T Calshot		United Kingdom	England	Southampton, United Kingdom	United Kingdom	1929	Tug tender	Scrapped in 2022	
City of Ragusa		United Kingdom	England	Liverpool, United Kingdom	United Kingdom	1870	Yawl	20-foot (6.1 m) ship's converted lifeboat, used for double transatlantic crossing. In Liverpool Museum until 1941 when destroyed by a bomb.	
De Wadden		United Kingdom	England	Liverpool, United Kingdom	United Kingdom	1917	Schooner	Merseyside Maritime Museum scrapped the vessel in 2024	
Jacinta		United Kingdom	England	Fleetwood, United Kingdom	United Kingdom	1972	Trawler	Scrapped in 2019	
TSS Manxman		United Kingdom	England	Birkenhead, United Kingdom	United Kingdom	1955	Packet steamer	Scrapped in 2011–2012	
HMS Plymouth		United Kingdom	England	Birkenhead, United Kingdom	United Kingdom	1959	Frigate	Scrapped in 2014 after closure of Warship Preservation Trust	
ST Sea Alarm		United Kingdom	Wales	Cardiff, United Kingdom	United Kingdom	1941	Tugboat	Scrapped in 1998	

== See also ==
- Ships of ancient Rome
- List of museum ships in North America
- Barcelona Charter
- List of ancient ships
- List of classic vessels
- List of lightships of the United States
- List of maritime museums in the United States
- List of museum ships of the United States military
- List of oldest surviving ships
- Ship replica
- Viking ship replica

== Bibliography ==
- Ehlers, Hartmut (2004). "The Paraguayan Navy: Past and Present, Part II". Warship International. XLI (2): 173–206. ISSN 0043-0374.
