= Yokohama Port Museum =

Maritime museum in Yokohama, Japan

Coordinates: 35.4537°N 139.6330°E

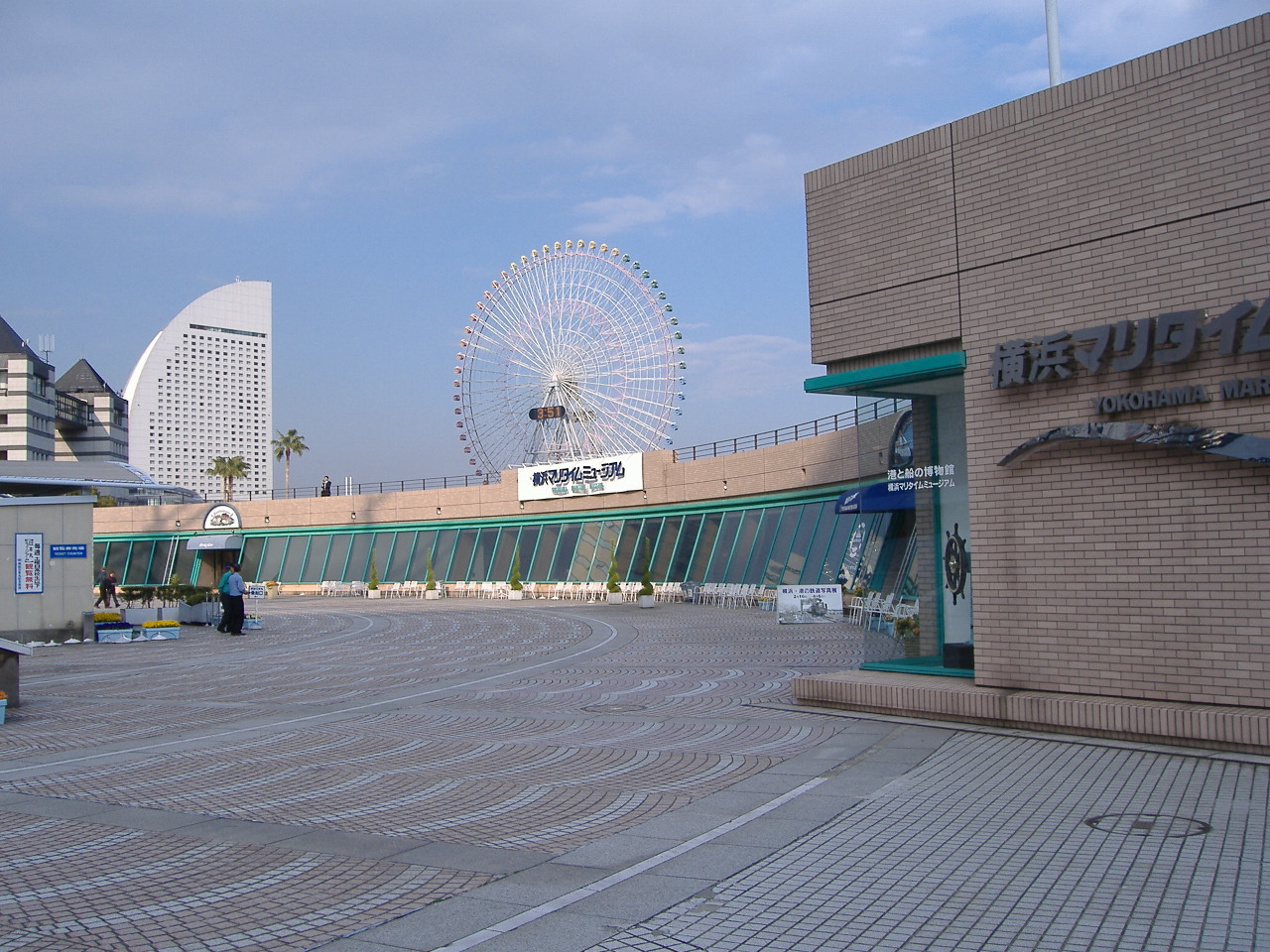
Yokohama Port Museum

Yokohama Port Museum (横浜みなと博物館, Yokohama Minato Myūjiamu), formerly known as Yokohama Maritime Museum is a museum in Yokohama, Kanagawa Prefecture, Japan. It is located are located in the Nippon Maru Memorial Park, which is found in the Minato Mirai 21 District Nishi-ku ward of the central business district.

== Overview ==
Juxtaposed with the 1989 Yokohama Expo, celebrating 150 years of the port, the Yokohama Maritime Museum which focuses on the harbor and vessels in Nihon Maru Memorial Park, was renovated and re-opened in the spring of 2009. At that time, the Yokohama Maritime Museum was rebranded at the "Yokohama Port Museum".

== Exhibit contents ==
- History zone of Yokohama Port

There is an exhibition on the history of Yokohama Port since the arrival of the black ship

- Rediscovering zone at Yokohama Port

There are exhibits related to harbor loading and shipbuilding, and a marine vessel ship simulator
