= SS Orion =

Museum ship in Stockholm, Sweden

Coordinates: 59.327350°N 18.080607°E

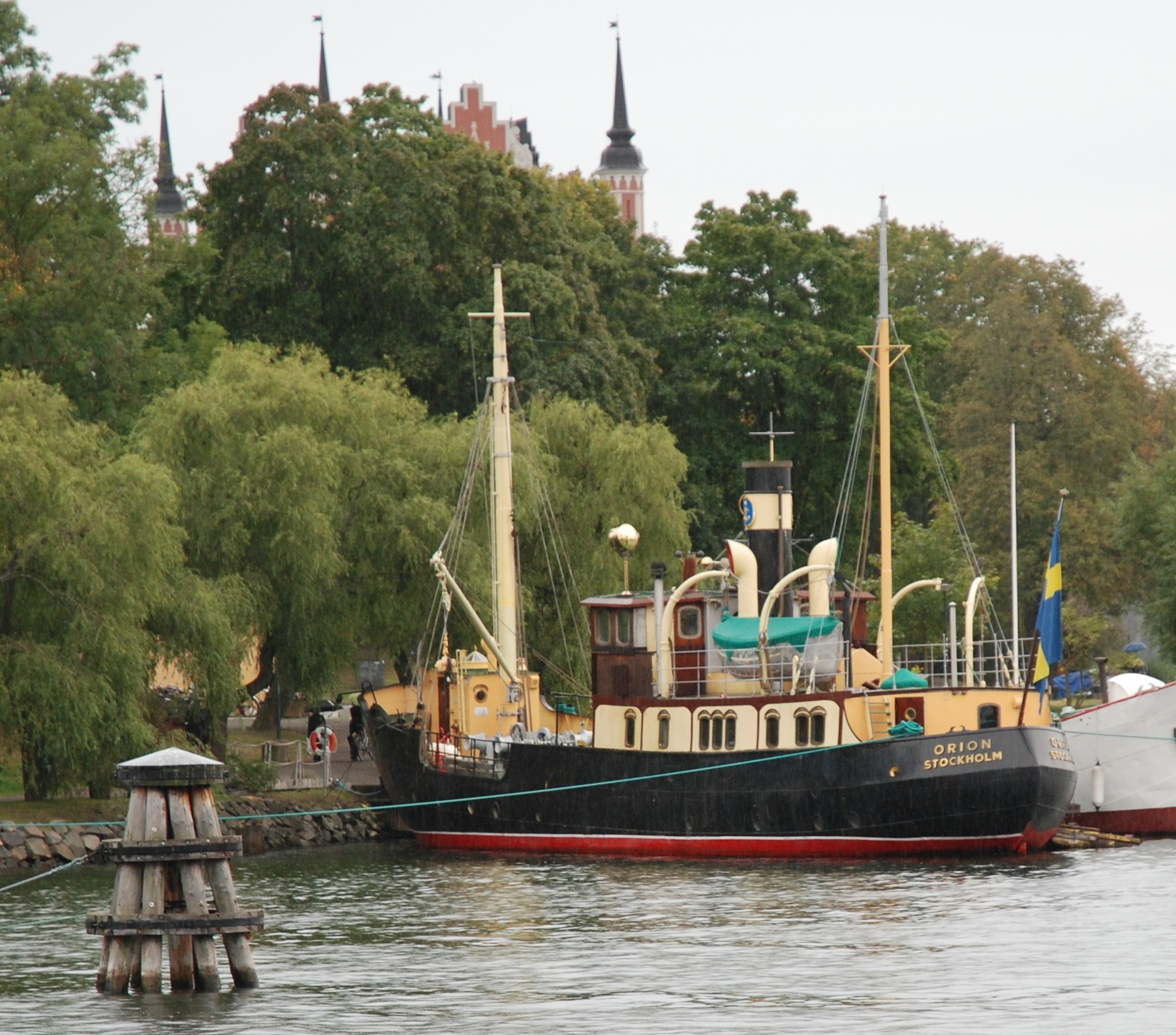
- S/S Orion at Skeppsholmen in Stockholm

History

Sweden
- Namesake: Orion (mythology) hunter, son to Poseidon
- Builder: Helsingborgs Varfs AB
- Laid down: 1929
- Decommissioned: 1979
- Reclassified: 1956
- Status: Museum ship in June 1993 at Skeppsholmen, Stockholm

General characteristics
- Type: Steamship
- Length: 32.44 m (29 m in 1929, lengthened 3 metres in 1961)
- Beam: 6.04 m
- Depth: 3.30 m
- Propulsion: Compound, Floodman valve gear
- Complement: 10 crew

S/S Orion is a steam-powered ship moored on the western shore of the islet Skeppsholmen in central Stockholm, Sweden. It is a listed historic ship of Sweden. The vessel, which is the oldest of its kind still remaining in Sweden, now serves as a museum ship.

== History ==
S/S Orion was built in 1929 at Helsingborgs Varfs AB shipyard in Helsingborg. It was a service ship for the Swedish Maritime Administration used for conducting inspections. S/S Orion served the Trosa - Karlskrona Pilot District between 1929 and 1956, with a home port in Kalmar. The vessel was used to inspect lighthouses, pilotage sites and to lay out and pick up buoys and to refill gas in lighthouses. She was decommissioned in 1979, and since 1993 has been a museum ship in the Skeppsholmen quay-berths.

== Gallery ==
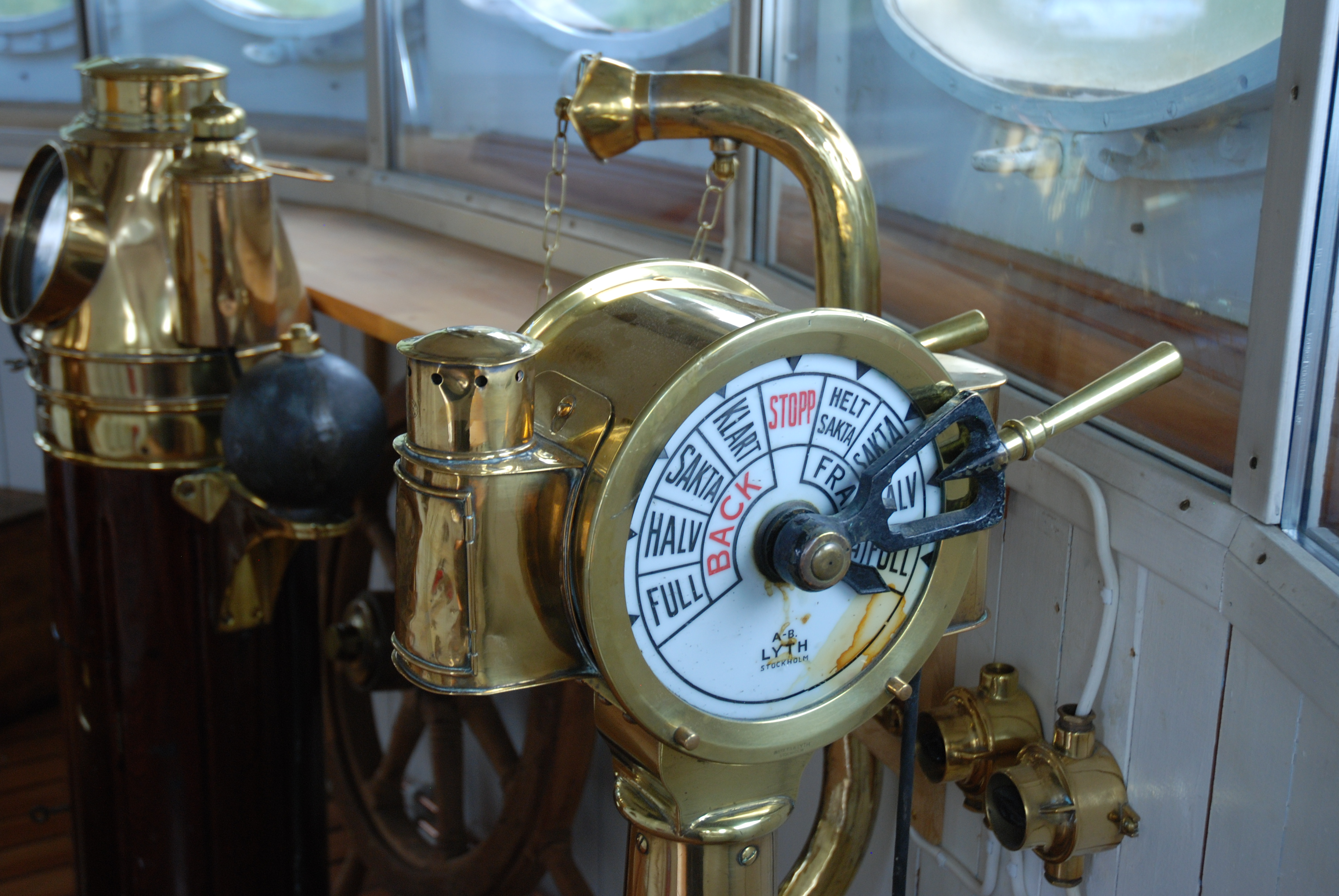
Maneuver pulpet

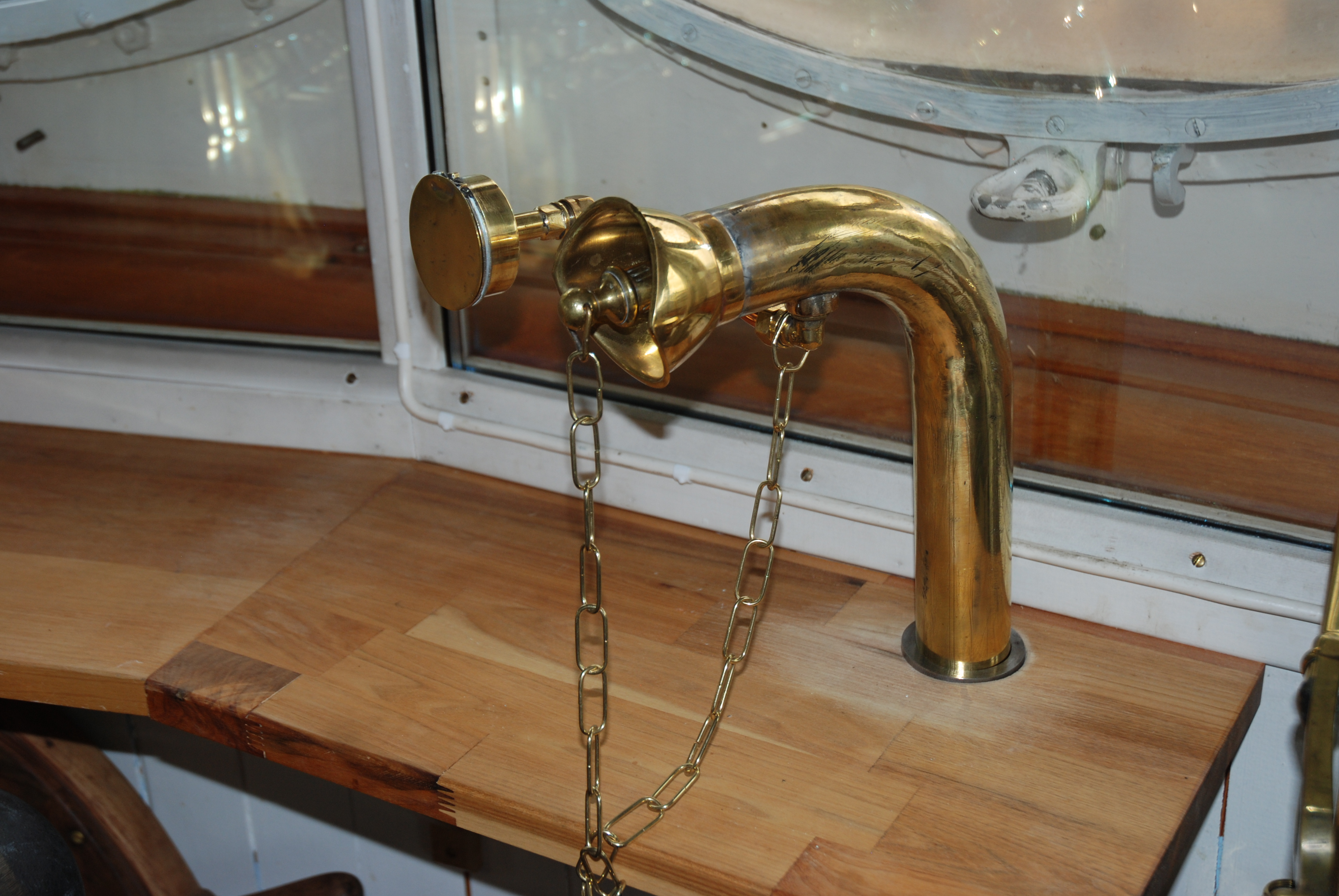
Speech pipe command bridge

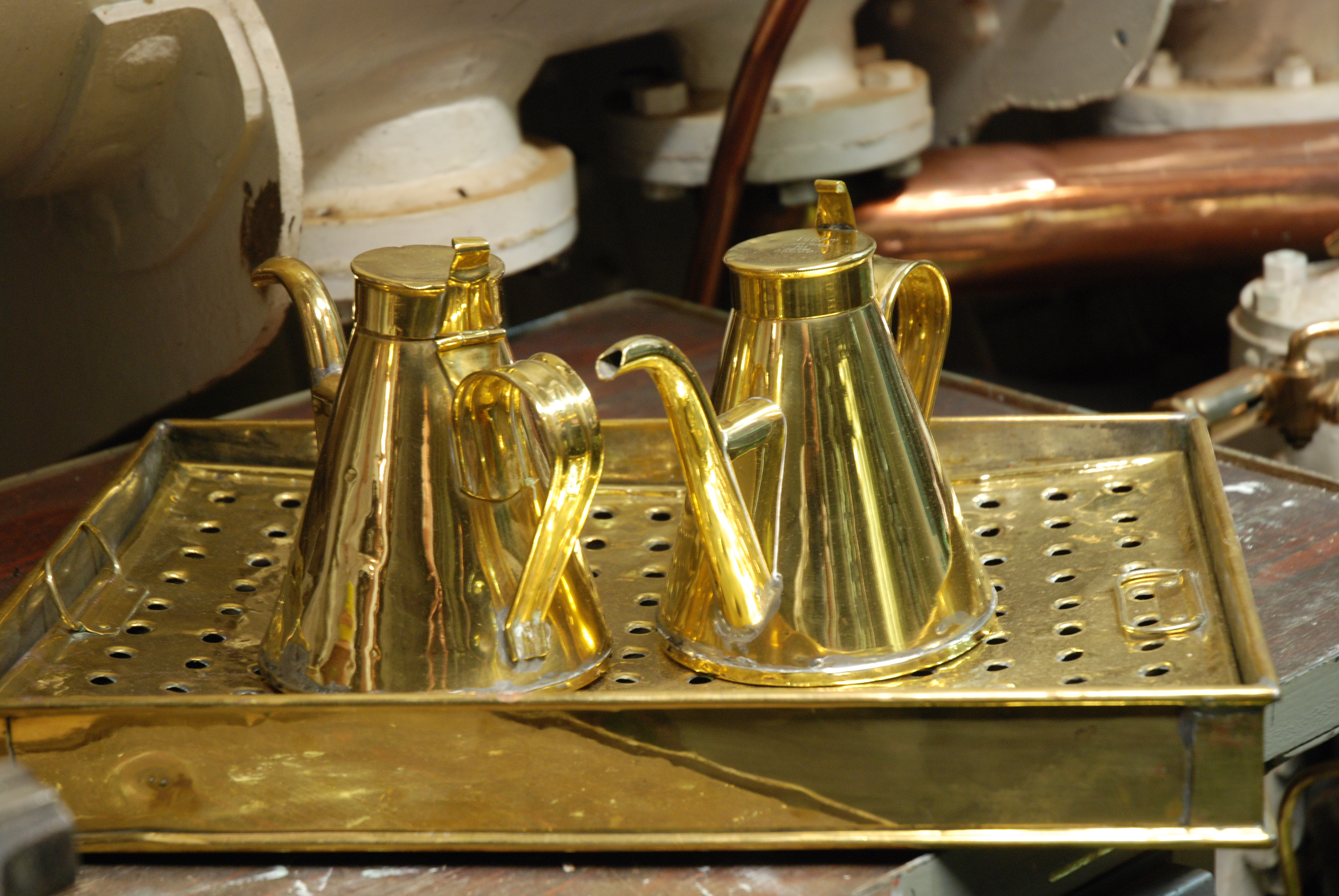
Lubricating oil pans

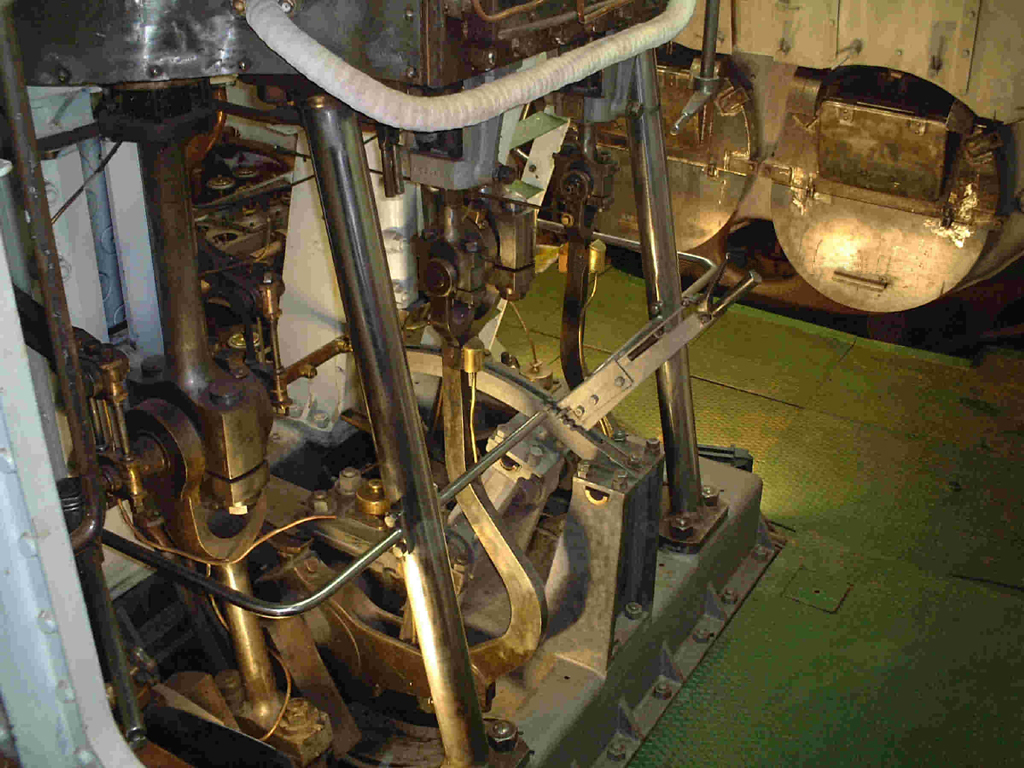
Compound steam Machine

== See also ==
- Swedish Maritime Administration
- List of museum ships
