= Mashu Maru =

Ship to carry passengers across the Tsugaru Strait

Coordinates: 41°46′23″N 140°43′19″E

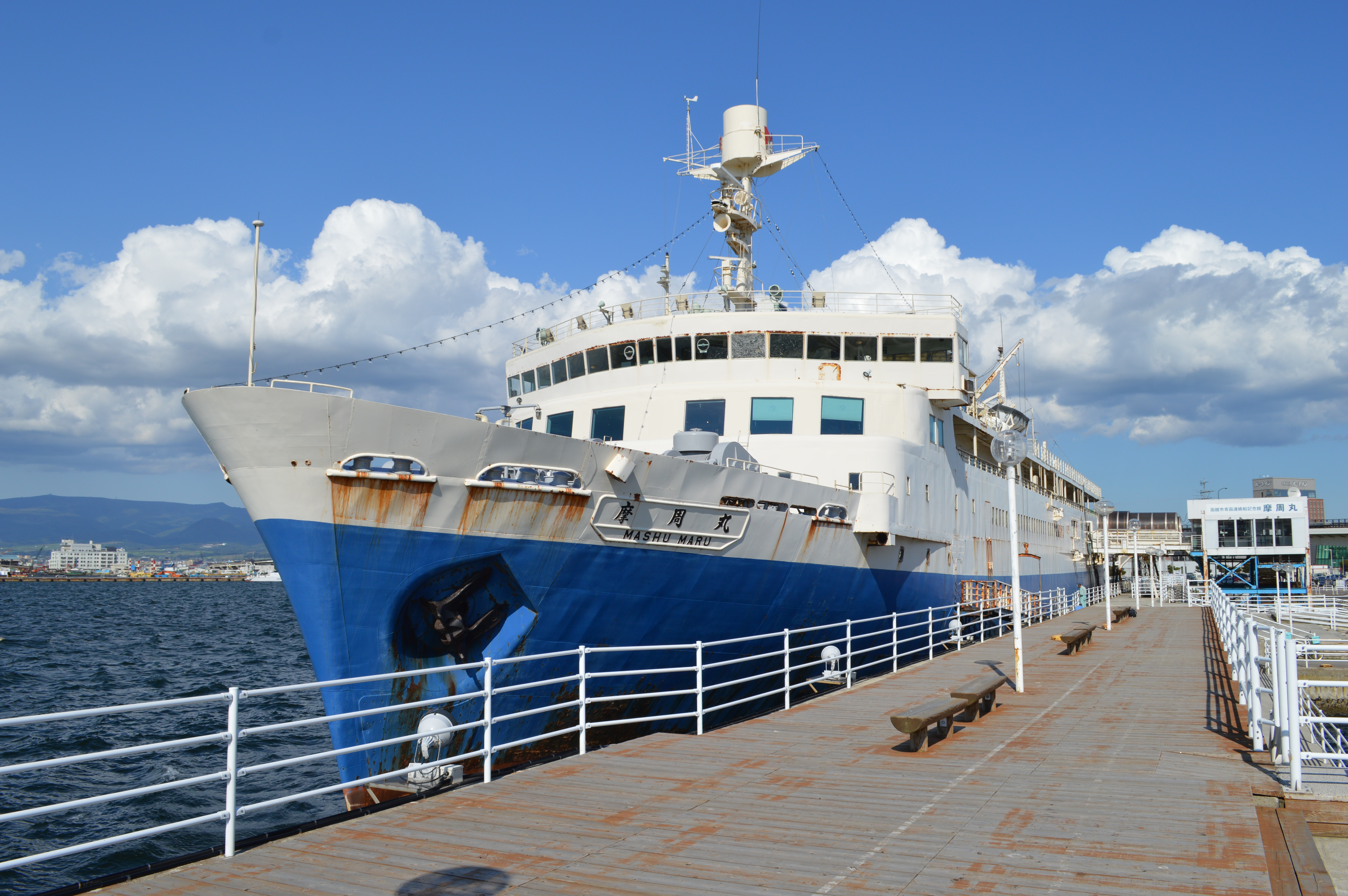
- Preserved Mashu Maru in Hakodate Bay, 2011

History
- Name: Mashu Maru
- Owner: Japanese National Railways (1965–1987); Hokkaido Railway Company (1987–1988)
- Operator: Japanese National Railways
- Port of registry: Hakodate
- Route: Seikan Ferry (Aomori to Hakodate)
- Ordered: July 1946
- Builder: Mitsubishi Heavy Industries' Kobe shipyard
- Yard number: 955
- Laid down: December 2, 1964
- Launched: June 15, 1965
- Completed: June 30, 1965
- Maiden voyage: June 30, 1965
- Out of service: March 13, 1988
- Status: Preserved as a museum ship at Hakodate Port
- Notes: Named after Lake Mashū

General characteristics
- Class & type: Tsugaru Maru-class train ferry
- Tonnage: 8,328 GRT
- Displacement: 8,300 t (8,200 long tons)
- Length: 132 m (433 ft 1 in)
- Beam: 17.9 m (58 ft 9 in)
- Height: 7.2 m (23 ft 7 in)
- Draft: 5.2 m (17 ft 1 in)
- Depth: 7.20 m (23 ft 7 in)
- Decks: 6
- Installed power: 12,800 hp (9,500 kW)
- Speed: 18.2 knots (33.7 km/h; 20.9 mph)
- Capacity: 1,200 passengers, 48 railway cars
- Crew: 50 to 53

The Mashu Maru was a Tsugaru Maru-class ferry operated by Japanese National Railways (JNR),, and shortly, JR Hokkaido before finally being taken out of service on March 13, 1988, with the opening of the undersea Seikan Tunnel.

== Background ==
The train ferry Mashu Maru got its name from Lake Mashū, a caldera lake in Hokkaido, Japan. Built at Mitsubishi Heavy Industries' Kobe Shipyard, she was the fifth vessel constructed of the Tsugaru Maru class.

== Career ==
Mashu Maru was launched on June 15, 1965, and entered service on June 30, 1965. As the fifth Tsugaru Maru-class train ferry for Japanese National Railways, it sailed the high-density Seikan Ferry route between Aomori and Hakodate across the Tsugaru Strait. The vessel carried both passengers and loaded railcars on its lower deck. This design provided reliable transit and cut travel times compared to older ferries. Ownership moved to Hokkaido Railway Company (JR Hokkaido) in April 1987 after the privatization of JNR.

== Retirement ==
The ship was officially retired from active service on March 13, 1988. Its retirement coincided with the opening of the Seikan Tunnel, which connected Japan's main island of Honshu to the northern island of Hokkaido via rail, rendering the traditional train ferries obsolete.

== Presevation ==
Workers modified the ship into an exhibition vessel after its retirement. It sits permanently at Pier 2 near Hakodate Station. The ship was closed for renovations and reopened in 2003 as the Hakodate City Seikan Ferry Memorial Ship Mashu Maru. Today, it operates as a public museum showing the bridge, wireless room, and vehicle deck.

== gallery ==
The ship at sea

Another angle of the ship

Radio operator's room

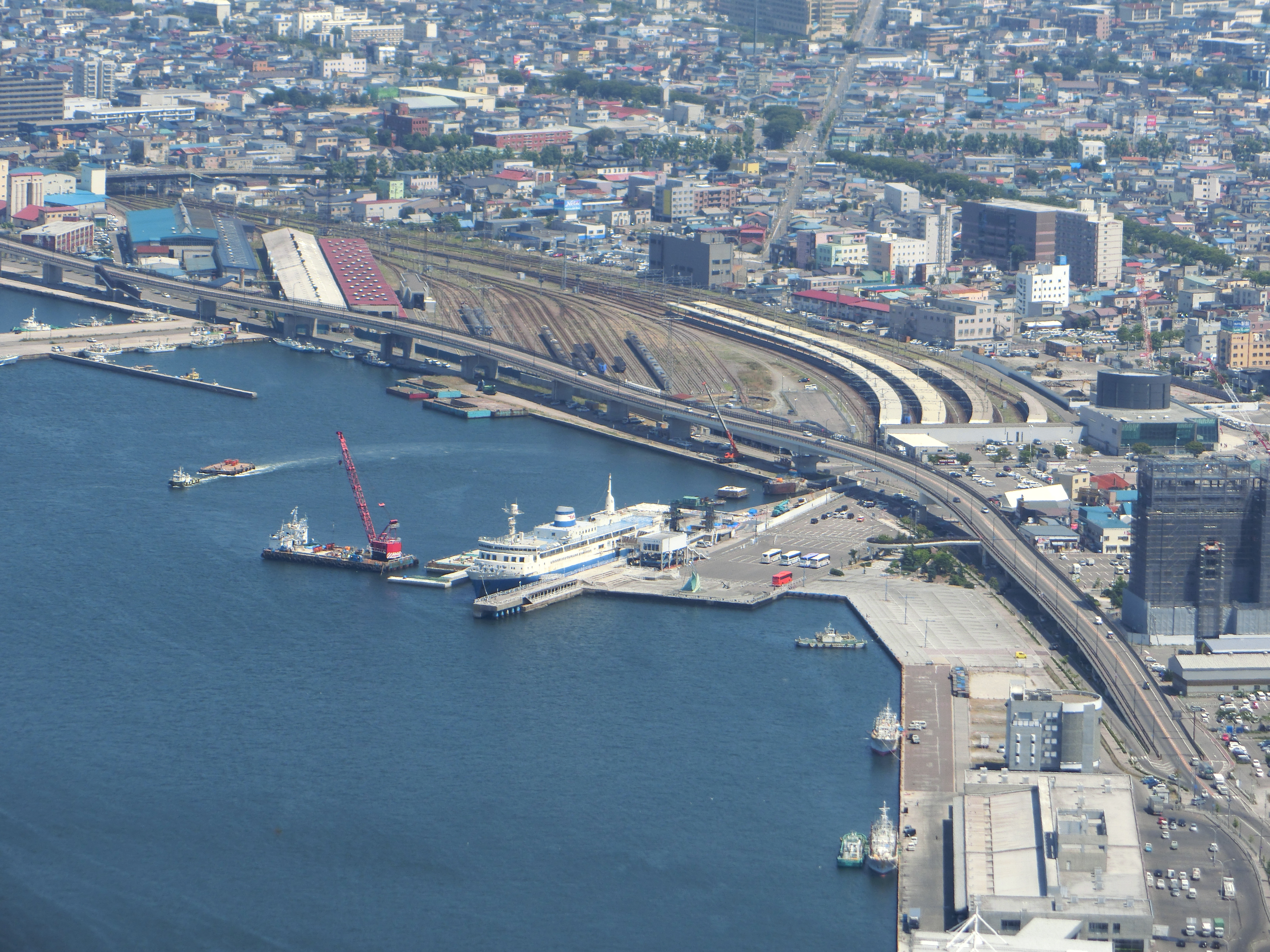
Bird's eye view of the ship and hakodate

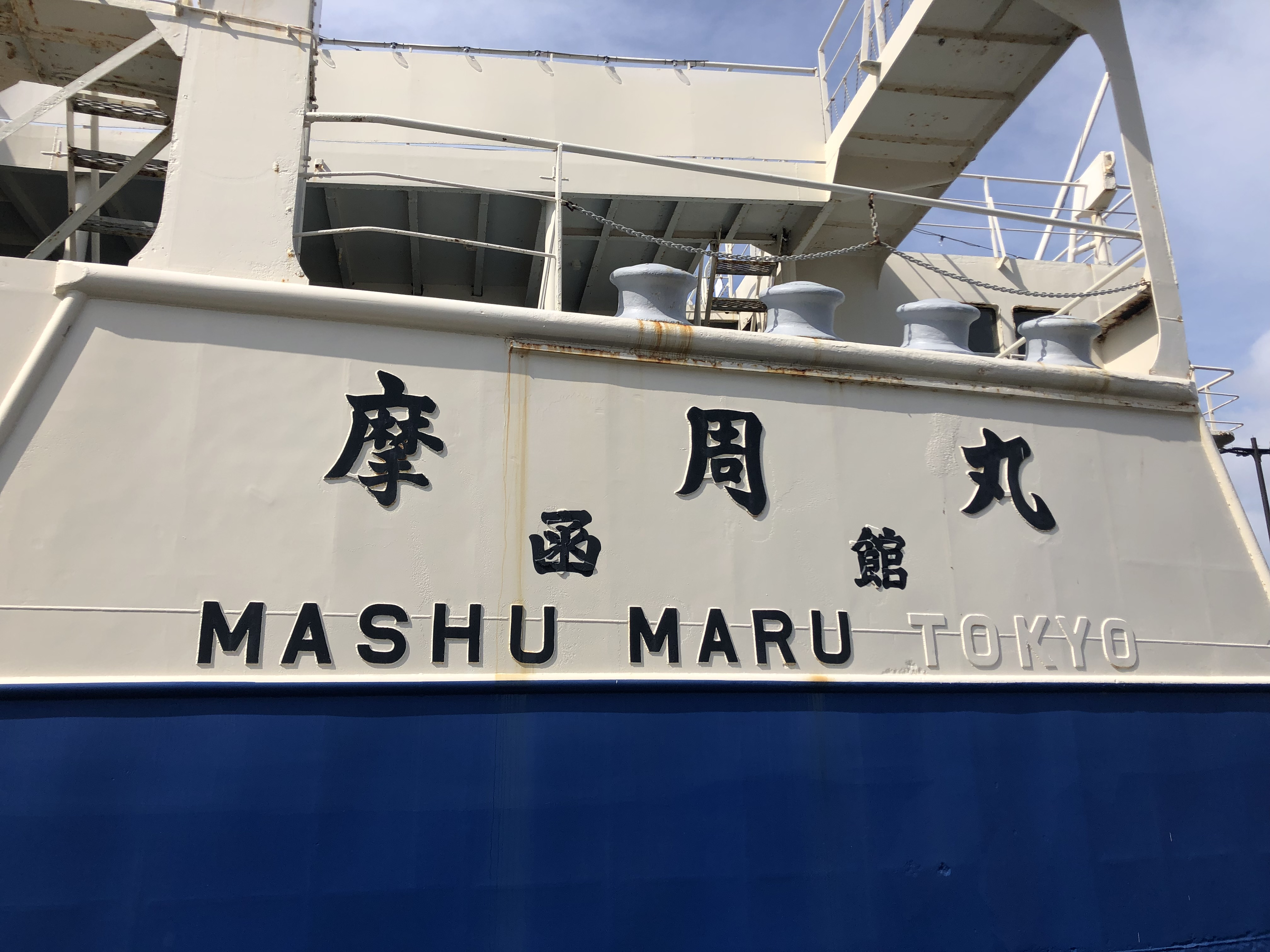
the ship's registration
