= Chinese destroyer Nanjing (131) =

Type 051 destroyer of the PLA Navy

Coordinates: 31.2600761°N 121.5494869°E

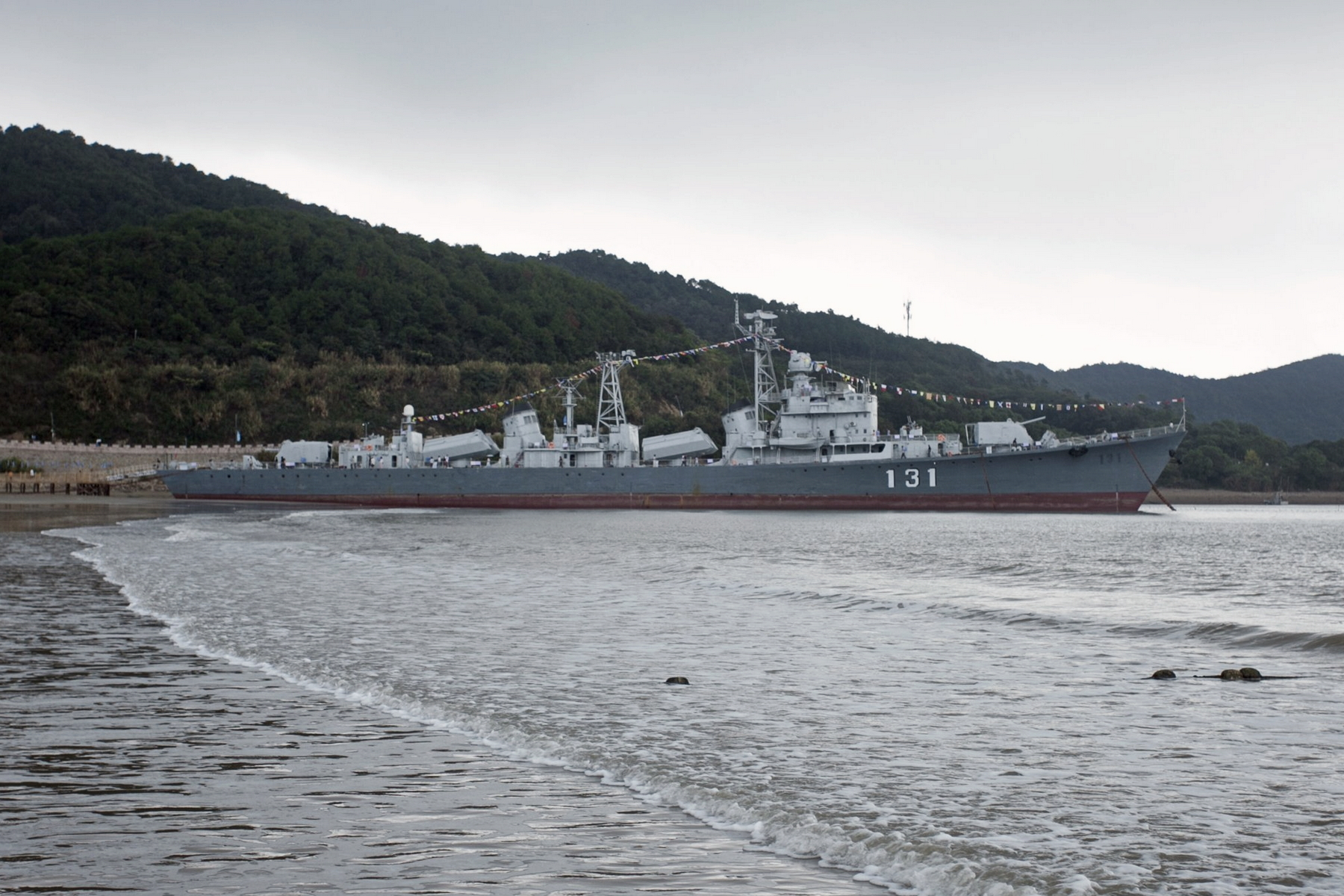
- Nanjing as a museum ship in Xiangshan County, Ningbo

History

China
- Name: Nanjing (南京)
- Namesake: Nanjing
- Builder: Zhonghua Shipyard, Shanghai
- Laid down: December 1970
- Launched: 11 December 1973
- Commissioned: 6 February 1977
- Decommissioned: 26 September 2012
- Identification: Pennant number: 131
- Status: Museum ship at Xiangshan County, Ningbo

General characteristics
- Class & type: Type 051 destroyer
- Displacement: 3,670 tons
- Length: 132 m (433 ft 1 in)
- Beam: 12.8 m (42 ft 0 in)
- Draught: 4.6 m (15 ft 1 in)
- Propulsion: 2 steam turbines; 72,000 shp (53,700 kW)
- Speed: 32 knots (59 km/h)
- Range: 2,970 miles
- Complement: 280
- Armament: 16 anti-ship missiles; 8 surface-to-air missiles + 16 spare (manual reload); 2 twin-barrel 130 mm dual purpose guns; 4 Type 76A dual-37 mm anti-aircraft guns; 2 Type 75 anti-submarine rocket systems; 6 torpedo tubes; Depth charges; 38 naval mines

Nanjing (131) is a Type 051 destroyer of the People's Liberation Army Navy.

== Development and design ==
The PLAN began designing a warship armed with guided missiles in 1960 based on the Soviet Neustrashimy, with features from the Kotlin-class destroyer, but the Sino-Soviet split stopped work. Work resumed in 1965 with nine ships being ordered.

== Construction and career ==
Nanjing was launched on 11 December 1973 at the Luda Shipyard in Shanghai. Commissioned on 6 February 1977.

She was decommissioned on 26 September 2012 and subsequently served as a maritime surveillance ship at Huangpu river, Shanghai. She was later moved to Xiangshan County, Ningbo as a museum ship and tourist attraction.
