= Frieden (museum ship) =

Coordinates: 54°8′36″N 12°5′8″E

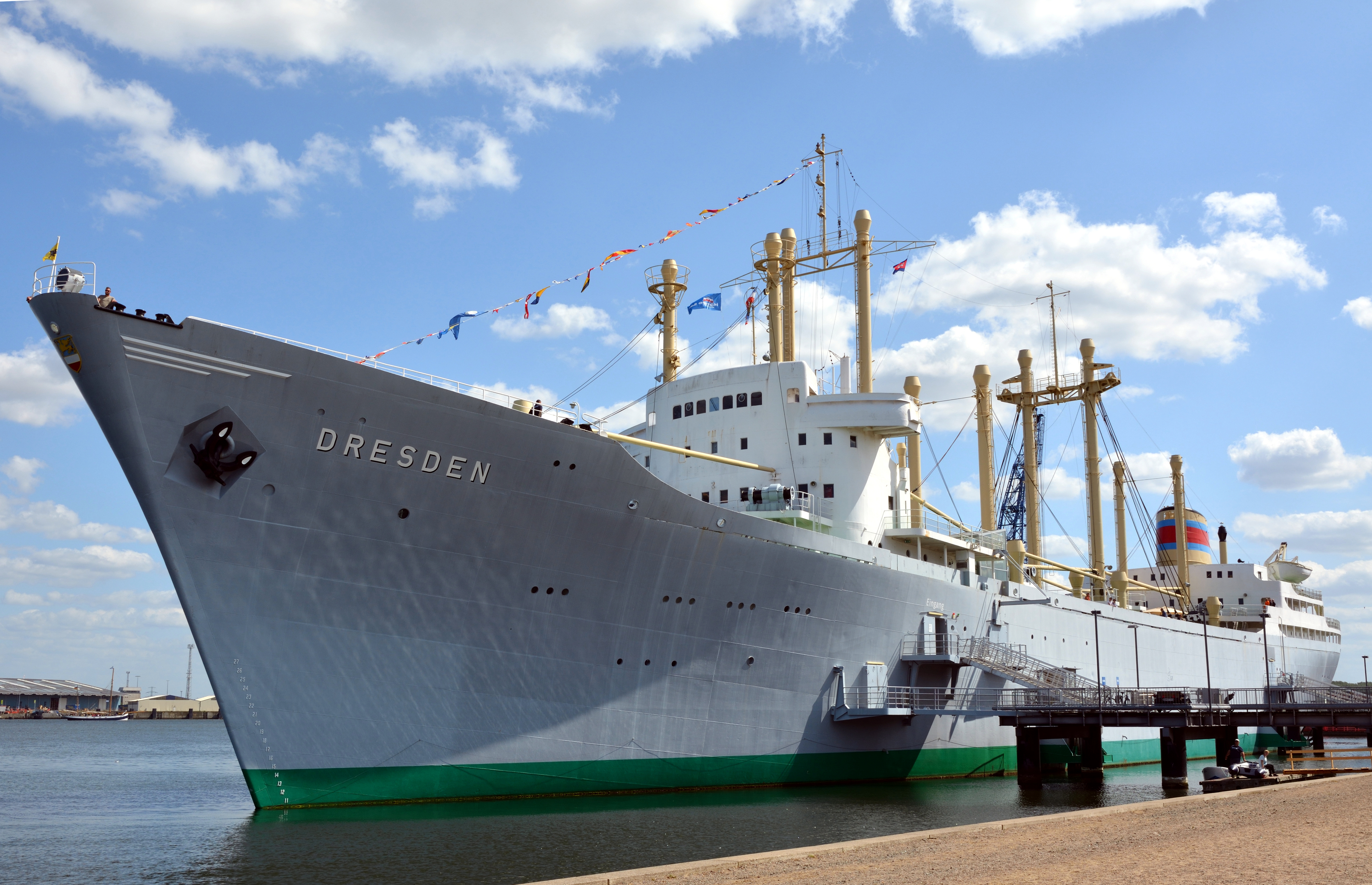
- The Dresden in 2019 in Rostock Harbour

History

Germany
- Name: Traditionsschiff Typ Frieden
- Port of registry: Rostock
- Builder: Warnow Shipyard, Warnemünde
- Yard number: 305
- Launched: 4 July 1957
- Commissioned: 27 July 1958
- Decommissioned: 1969
- Identification: IMO number: 5121380
- Status: Museum ship

General characteristics
- Type: Cargo ship
- Tonnage: 6,629 GRT, 13,000 dwt
- Length: 157.6 m (517 ft) (Loa), 142.0 m (Lpp)
- Beam: 20.0 m (65.6 ft)
- Draught: 8.4 m (28 ft)
- Installed power: 7,200 PS (5,296 kW)
- Propulsion: 4 diesel engines; 2 propellers
- Speed: 15.0 knots (27.8 km/h; 17.3 mph)
- Crew: 57

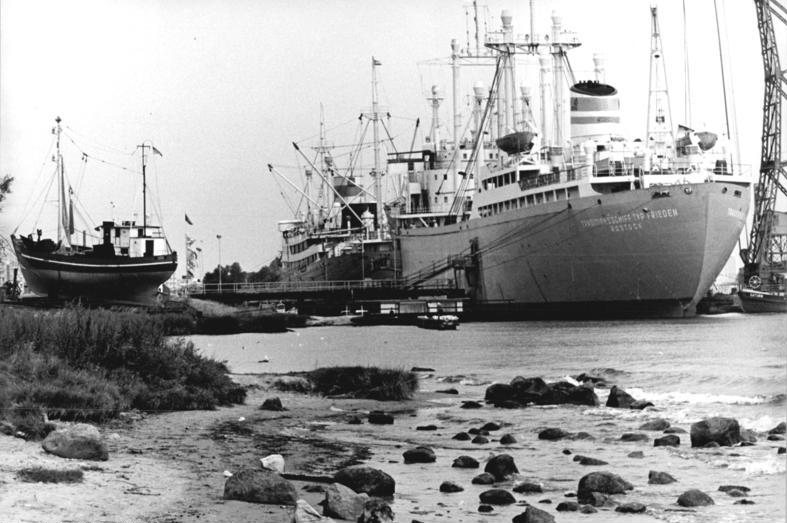
The Traditionsschiff Typ Frieden, 1982 photograph

The Frieden (known in German as the Traditionsschiff Typ Frieden) is the former German motor vessel Dresden operated by the VEB Deutsche Seereederei Rostock. Since 1970 it has been used as a museum ship.

The Dresden was built in 1956/57 at the Warnow Shipyard. It was the fifth Type IV ship in the first batch of 10,000 tonne piece-goods freighters that were built in East Germany's shipyards after the Second World War. Because the first ship of this series was christened Frieden (commissioned in June 1957), the other ships of this series of 15 new vessels were classed as Frieden type merchant ships.

On 27 July 1958 the ship was handed over to the Deutsche Seereederei shipping line and it operated until 1969 on scheduled services to East Asia, Indonesia, Africa, India and Latin America.

After some serious defects that were found in the engine room that would have resulted in excessive repair costs, the ship was decommissioned in 1969 and opened on 13 June 1970 as the "Rostock Shipbuilding Museum" (Schiffbaumuseum Rostock). Part of the ship also acted as a youth hostel for a time.

Today it is part of the Rostock Shipbuilding and Shipping Museum (Rostocker Schiffbau- und Schifffahrtsmuseum) in the IGA Park and contains comprehensive exhibitions of shipbuilding history. Topics include Shipbuilding in East Germany, Shipyard Operations, the History of Maritime Radio Communications and Navigation. In addition, there is a collection of various types of ship engine. Many areas of the ship have been preserved in their original state (the engine room, bridge, radio station, ship's hospital and crew cabins) and give an impression of life on a merchant ship in the 1950/60s.

The Rostock City Harbour Museum Ship action group (Traditionsschiff Stadthafen Rostock) is advocating moving the shipyard and shipping museum to a central and easily accessible site in the centre of Rostock. Low visitor numbers have been cited as the reason for this initiative.
