= USS LST-853 =

US Navy tank landing ship

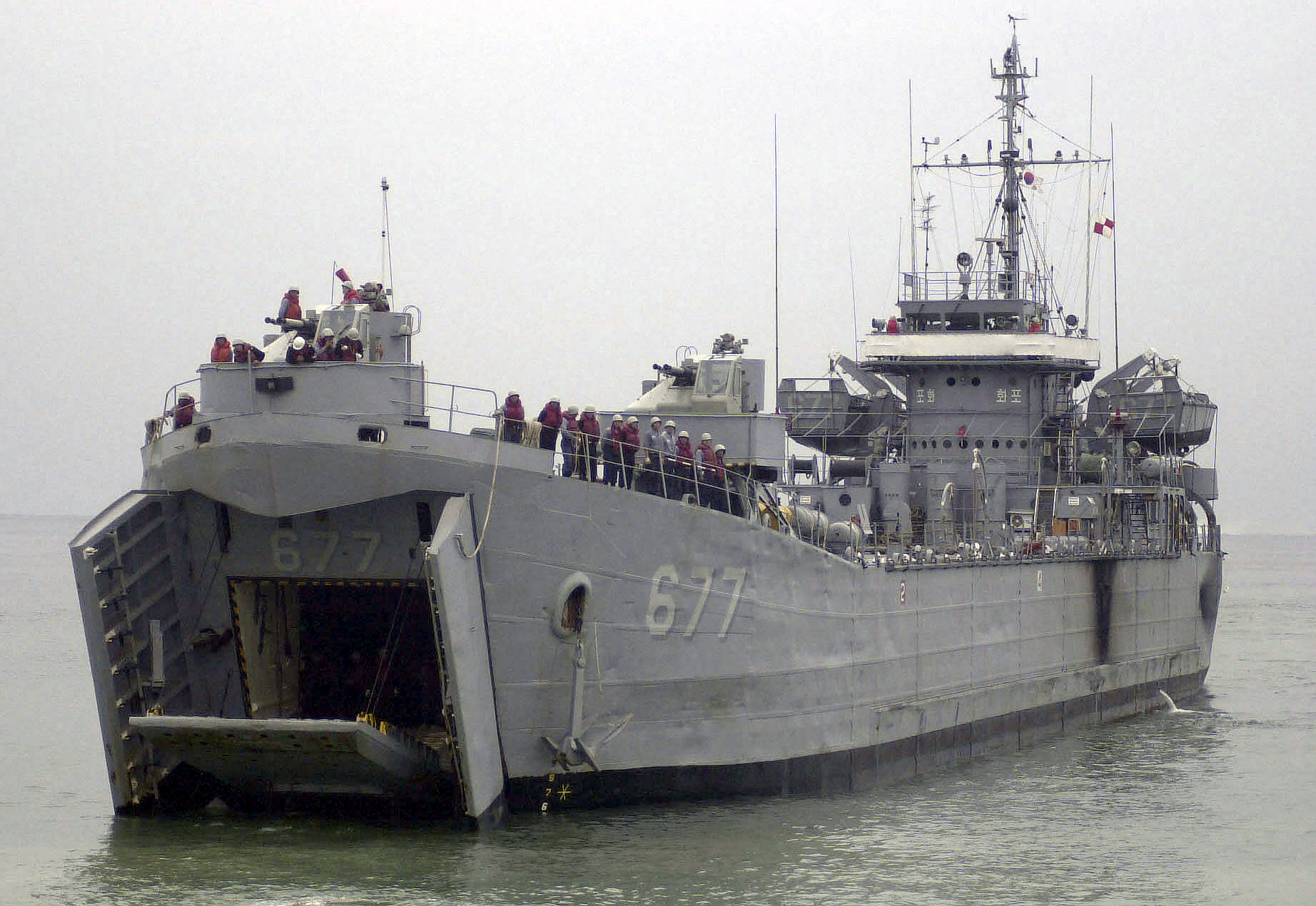
- ROKS Suyeong in 2000.

History

United States
- Name: USS Kane County (LST-853)
- Laid down: 30 August 1944
- Launched: 17 November 1944
- Commissioned: 11 December 1944
- Decommissioned: 24 July 1946
- Fate: Transferred to South Korea, 22 December 1958
- Honours and awards: One battle star

South Korea
- Name: Suyeong; (수영)
- Acquired: 22 December 1958
- Out of service: 2005
- Status: Museum ship until 2017; returned to the Navy in 2020

General characteristics
- Class & type: LST-542-class LST
- Displacement: 1,490 tons (light); 4,080 tons (full load of 2,100 tons)
- Length: 328 ft (100 m)
- Beam: 50 ft (15 m)
- Draft: 8 ft (2.4 m) forward; 14 ft 4 in (4.37 m) aft (full load)
- Propulsion: Two diesel engines, two shafts
- Speed: 10.8 knots (20 km/h) (max); 9 knots (17 km/h) (econ)
- Complement: 7 officers, 204 enlisted
- Armament: 8 × 40 mm guns; 12 × 20 mm guns

USS LST-853 was an LST-542-class tank landing ship in the United States Navy during World War II. Later in her U.S. Navy career she was renamed Kane County (LST-853)—after counties in Illinois and Utah—but never saw active service under that name.

LST-853 was laid down on 30 August 1944 at Seneca, Illinois, by the Chicago Bridge & Iron Co.; launched on 17 November 1944; sponsored by Mrs. Ellen Scott De-Coursey; and commissioned on 11 December 1944.

After shakedown off Florida, LST-853 departed New Orleans for the Pacific 19 January 1945. She loaded troops and equipment on the west coast before steaming from Seattle 10 March. Sailing via Pearl Harbor, Eniwetok, and Guam, she arrived at Saipan 25 April. The landing ship embarked units of the 1878th Engineer Aviation Battalion, then sailed on the 27th for Okinawa. Arriving 6 days later in the midst of enemy air raids, LST-853 discharged men and equipment on this strategic base which lay at the gateway to Japan.

She returned to Saipan 24 May and, during the remaining months of the war, shuttled troops and equipment among the Marianas, Philippines and Okinawa staging areas for the planned invasion of Japan. The enemy's acceptance of Allied peace terms obviated an invasion, so LST-853 then operated in the Far East, transporting occupation forces until early December.

Arriving Saipan 13 December 1945, she embarked veterans of the Pacific fighting in the Marianas and sailed for the United States in January 1946. After arrival on the West Coast, LST-853 then sailed to Astoria, Oregon; and decommissioned at Vancouver, Washington, 24 July 1946. While berthed in the Columbia River with the Pacific Reserve Fleet, she was named Kane County 1 July 1955.

Under provisions of the Military Assistance Program, she was transferred to the Republic of Korea 22 December 1958, and served the ROK navy as Suyeong (LST-813).

LST-853 earned one battle star for World War II service.

== ROKS Suyeong ==
The ship was transferred to the Republic of Korea on 22 December 1958, and renamed ROKS Suyeong (LST-813). She was later redesignated LST-677 and retired on 29 Dec 2005. Following her retirement, she was put on display as a museum ship and tourist attraction in Danghangpo Tourism Zone, Goseong County, South Gyeongsang.

Suyeong's condition deteriorated during her time on display, and in 2017 she was declared unsafe for exhibition. In 2020, she was returned to the Naval Logistics Command and towed from the Danghangpo Tourism Zone to Mokpo.
