= Vridni =

Screw steamer tug, built 1894 in Croatia

Coordinates: 43°31′16″N 16°26′44″E

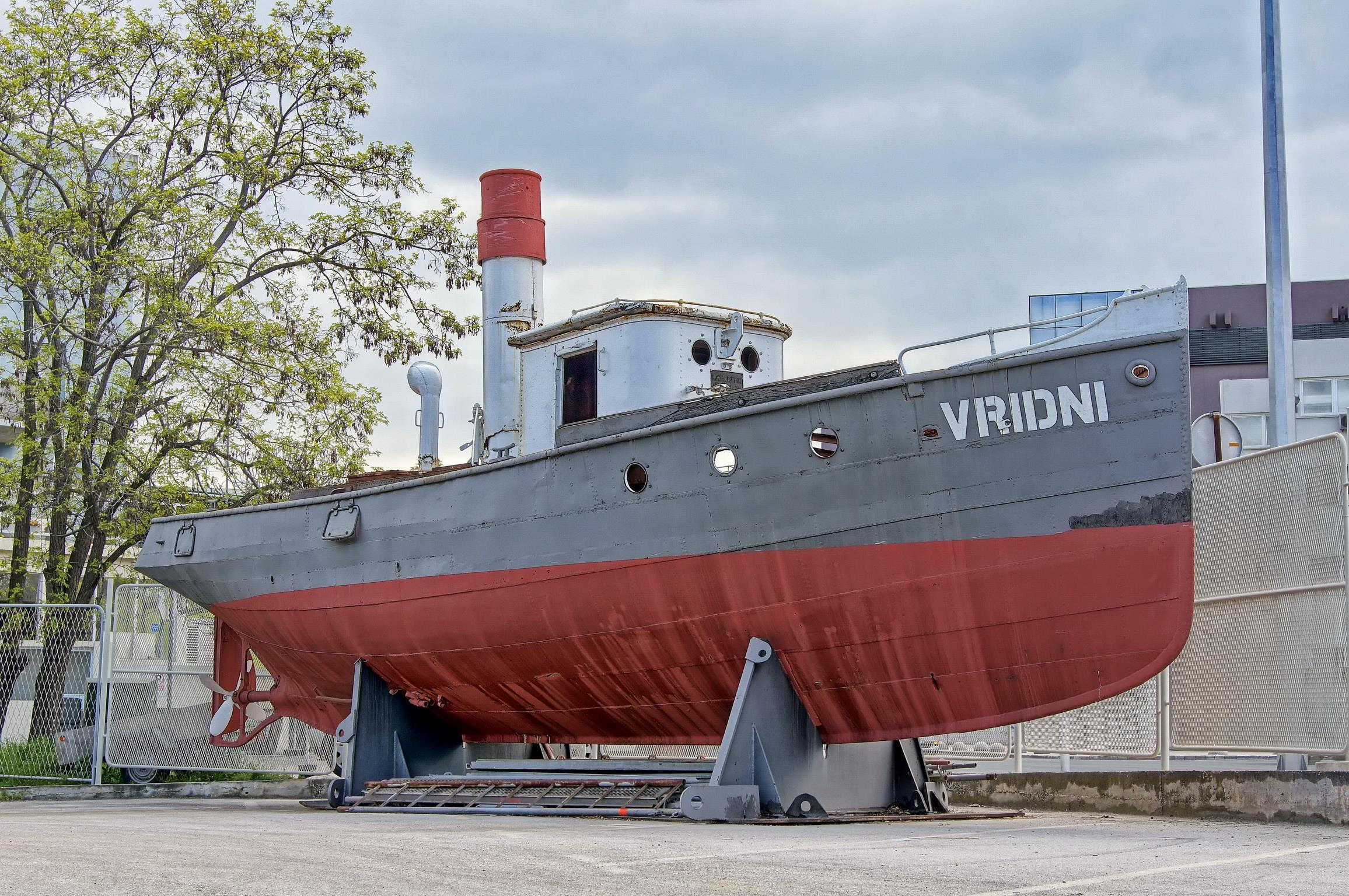
- Vridni in Split, Croatia, as seen on April 10, 2013 (The wooden superstructure missing)

History
- Name: 1894-1922: Légy; 1922-1944: Doket; 1946-1962: Omladinac; 1962-onwards: Vridni
- Owner: 1894-1902: Howaldt & Co., Rijeka (Fiume); 1902-1922: Impressa Triestina di Tomasso Cossovich & Ci., Trieste; 1922-1944: Pomorsko tehničko industrijsko poduzeće d.d. "Marjan" Split; 1946-onwards: Brodosplit-Shipyard Ltd.
- Builder: Howaldtswerke's subsidiary Howaldt & Co. Rijeka (Fiume)
- Yard number: (Should be) 1
- Launched: 1894
- Completed: 1894
- Status: Memorial ship

General characteristics
- Class & type: Harbor tug
- Tonnage: 10.7 DWT
- Length: Loa 12.80 m (42 ft 0 in); Lpp 12.00 m (39 ft 4 in)
- Beam: 2.90 m (9 ft 6 in)
- Height: 1.50 m (4 ft 11 in)
- Draught: 1.20 m (3 ft 11 in)
- Installed power: 33 kW
- Propulsion: Steam engine; Scotch marine boiler; Four bladed propeller
- Speed: 6 kn

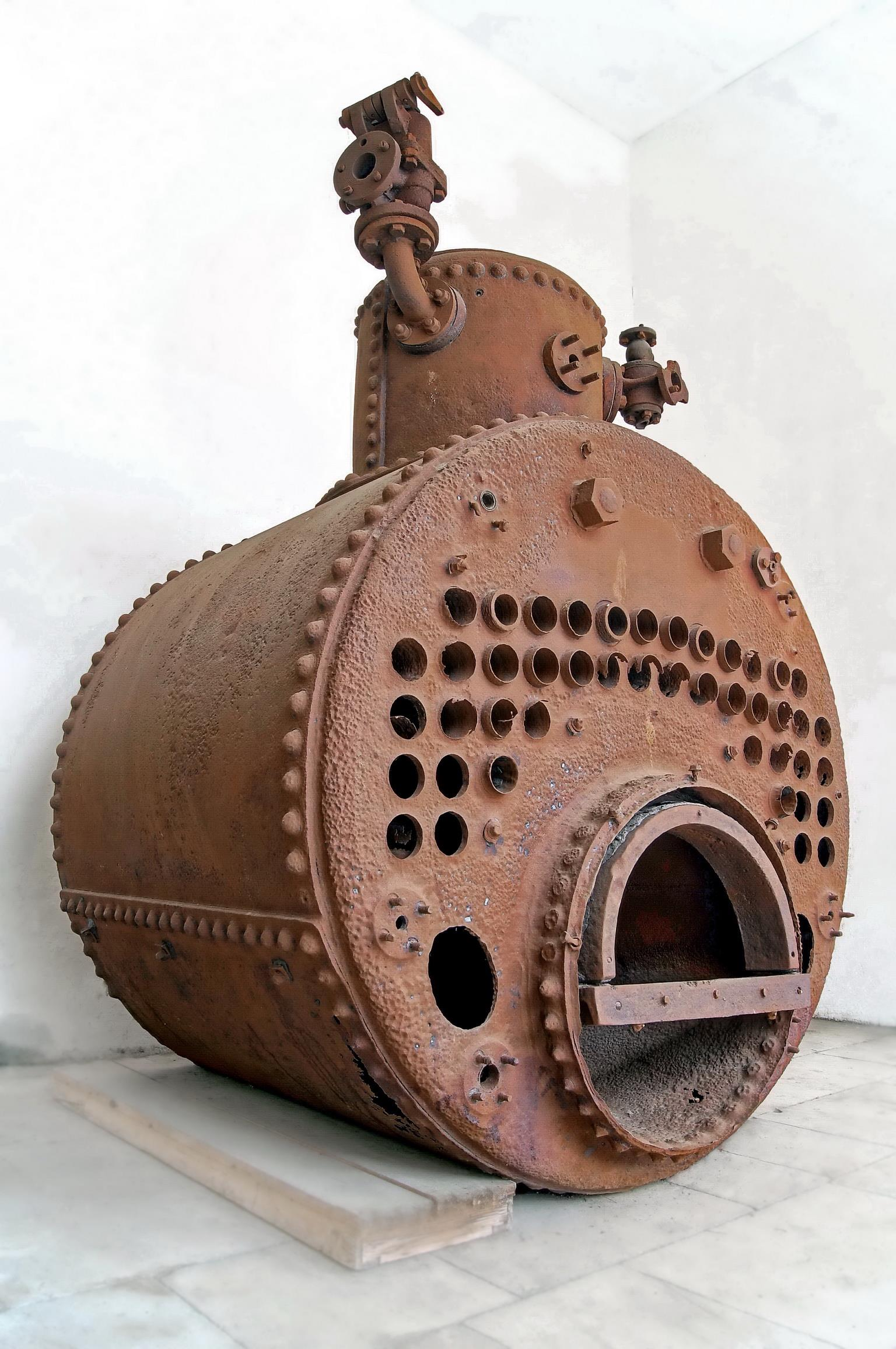
Steam boiler of Vridni. Dimensions: Diameter 1.40 m; Length 1.10 m. Now stored at Brodosplit Shipyard, Split.

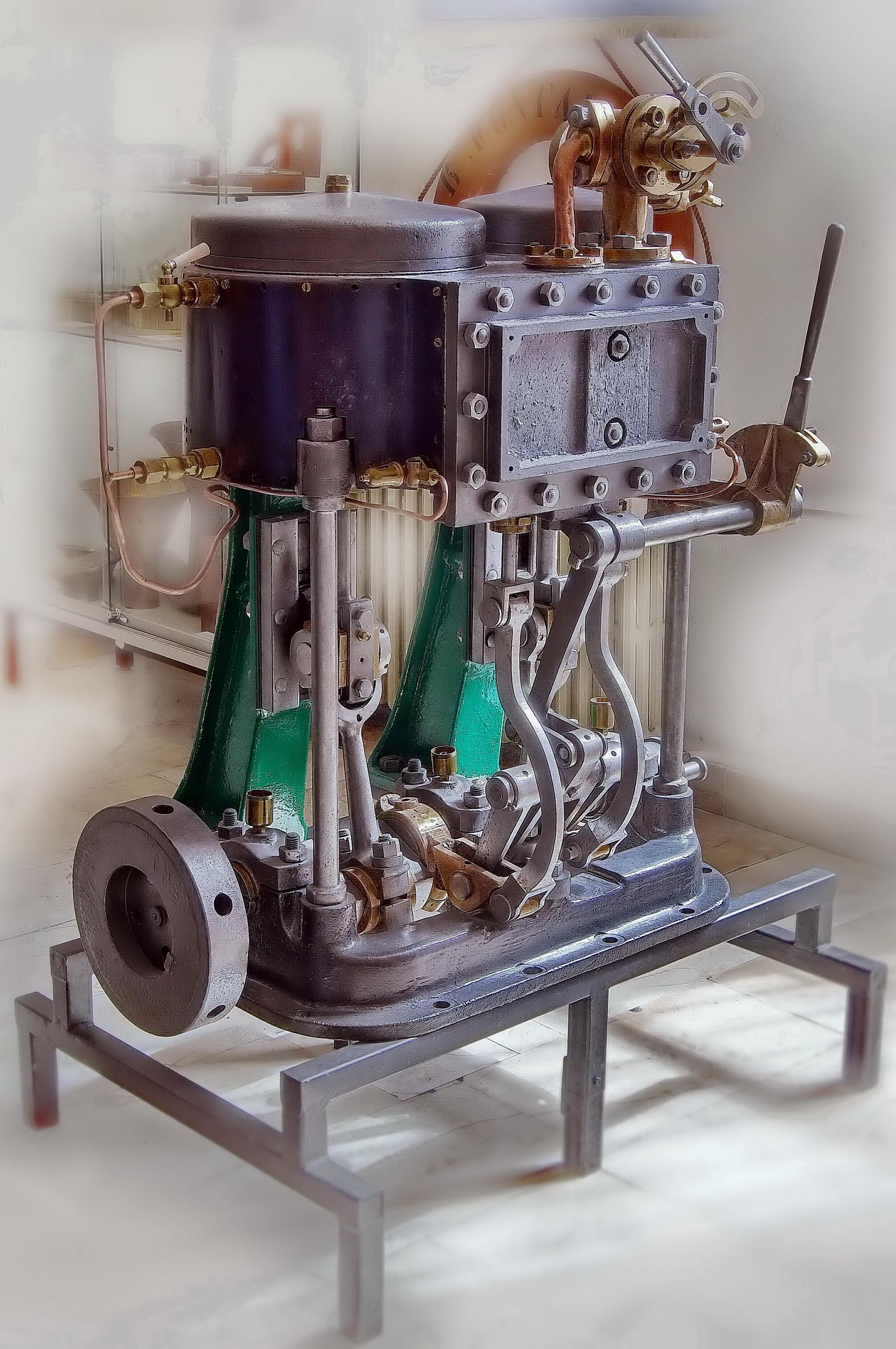
Reciprocating steam engine of Vridni. Height: Approx. 1 m. Made in 1894 by Howaldtswerke, Kiel. Now an exhibit at Croatian Maritime Museum, Split.

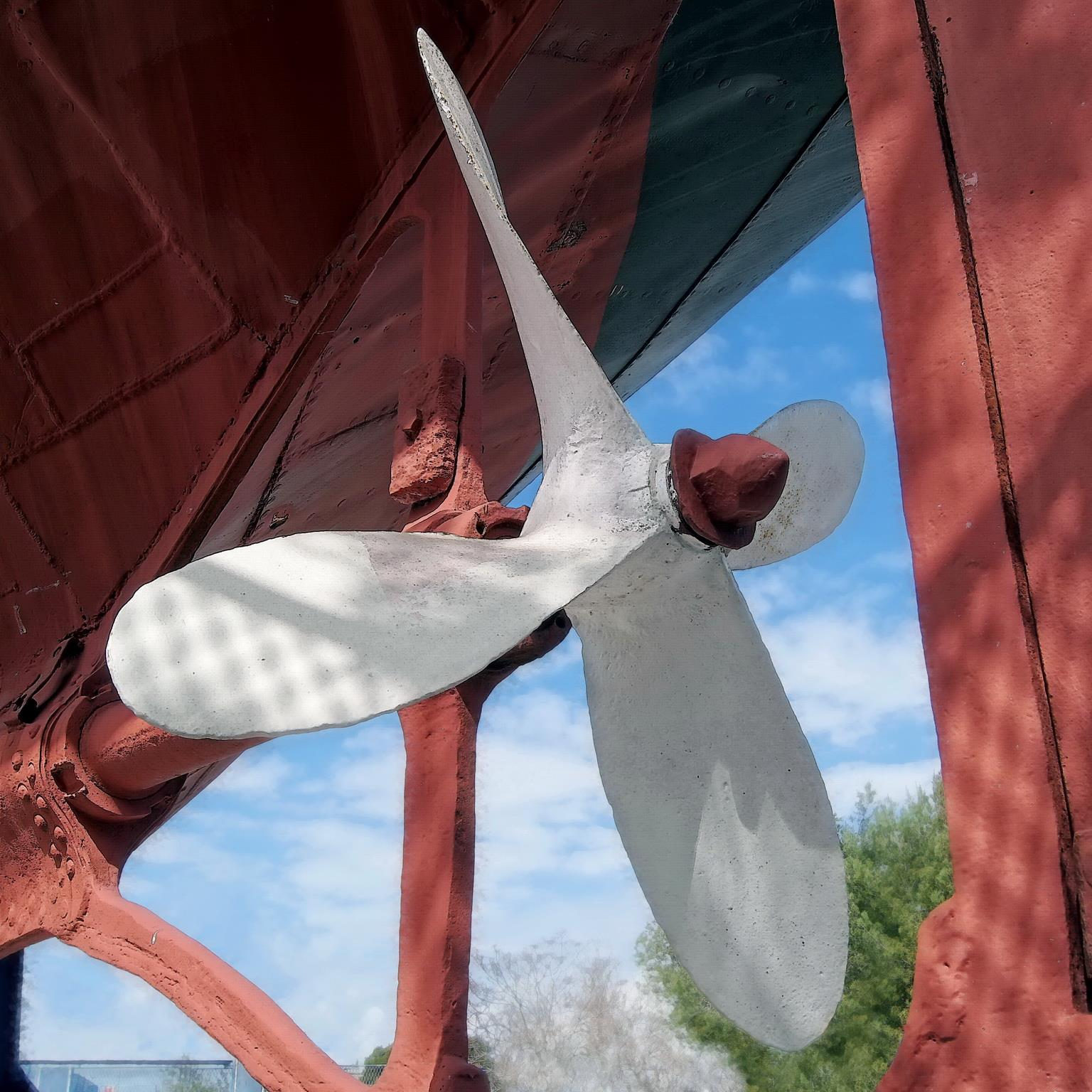
Steel four bladed propeller of Vridni, painted white. Diameter: 900 mm

Vridni is a steel screw steamer tug, built in Rijeka, Croatia (at that time Fiume, Austria-Hungary), in 1894, as Légy, (Note: According to some sources the ship served in Rijeka under the name Doket, meaning: dock.) by Howaldtswerke's subsidiary Howaldt & Co, as the first newbuild of the then new shipyard in Brgudi, Rijeka (nowadays 3. Maj Shipyard), and one of the two tugs built for the shipyard's own use. The reciprocating steam engine was made in Kiel, Germany.

== History ==
In 1902 Howaldt & Co. ceased to exist, and Légy was sold to Impressa Triestina di Tomasso Cossovich & Ci. of Trieste. In 1922 the vessel arrived in Split, Croatia, where, under the name Doket, she served as a harbor tug until 1932. Then the ship was used for tugging some lesser tows in Split Shipyard (now Brodosplit Shipyard Ltd.). In World War II, the ship is, since the autumn of 1943, included into the Yugoslav Partisan Navy, hiding from dangers of German aviation at coves and bays of the island of Hvar. In that same year the ship participated in the rescuing of the steamer Gruž in waters surrounding the island of Brač. During the bombing of Split, on August 30, 1944, the vessel suffered damage, and was later repaired in Vis. Afterwards, the ship served as one of the auxiliary cargo ships of the Partisan Navy, until the end of the war.

After World War II, the ship was firstly renamed Omladinac (not known exactly when), then Vridni in 1962; serving in Brodosplit Shipyard until 1969.

Today, Vridni is, being in a relatively poor condition, and devoid of engine, (Note: The steam engine itself has been disassembled and restored, and is a showpiece at the Croatian Maritime Museum, Split, while the steam boiler is preserved and stored at the Brodosplit Shipyard internal museum.) exposed at a parking lot of Brodosplit Shipyard, apparently awaiting a restoration to a museum ship.

== Description and features ==
A metal plate nowadays found at the superstructure says: "HOWALDTSWERKE, KIEL, 1894, No 452" but this is probably not the original plate, since the yardnumber 452 was, reportedly, a pontoon "A" built in 1906,

The Nautical Almanac of the Ministry of Transport of the Kingdom of Yugoslavia for the year 1930 states that Doket is a steam tug with propeller, made of steel, speed 8 knots, draught 1.5 m, length 12.5 m, beam 2.8 m, height 1.5 m. grt 11, nrt 5, nhp 10, ihp 50. Place of built Rijeka (Fiume) 1894. Minimum crew 2. Maps 24. Owner: Maritime Technical Industrial Company d.d. "Marjan" Split. (Note: Pomorsko tehničko industrijsko poduzeće d.d. "Marjan" Split.)

=== Construction ===
The ship is characterized by a rather unusual cylindrical form, especially at the underwater part, which resulted in good maritime traits (the waves created by sailing were, allegedly, "almost invisible"). The construction is of a riveted steel, with wooden deck, metal funnel and wooden superstructure (now missing).

=== Propulsion ===
The cylindrical coal-fired steam boiler and reciprocating steam engine, producing maximum power of 45 ihp (33 kW), occupied the boiler room and the engine room amidship. The engine powered a four-bladed, high-graded (approximately P/D ~ 1) propeller, of 900 mm in diameter, with extremely narrow blades (of approximately A_{D}/A_{O} ~ 0.2), allowing the speed of some 6 kn. The Scotch-type boiler is 1.40 m in diameter and 1.10 m in length. Relatively large steam dome is 500 mm in diameter and length. The outer sheath of the cylindrical funnel is 540 mm in diameter. The diameter of the propeller axis is 70 mm, and the length of the propeller hub is 110 mm.

== Status ==
The ship is included in the list of cultural properties of Republic of Croatia, under the registry number Z-437.

== Miscellany ==
- The ship's name Vridni is a Croatian dialectal word (Note: As used in Dalmatia, particularly in Split.) meaning "diligent".
- The ship's original name Légy is Hungarian word staying for "fly" (the insect).
- The Brodosplit Shipyard Gazette was named, after the ship, "Vridni".
- The vessel is among the oldest completely preserved ships in the world.
