= HMNZS Manawanui (1948) =

Royal New Zealand Navy tug and diving tender

History

New Zealand
- Name: HMNZS Manawanui
- Builder: Steel Ships Ltd, Auckland
- Launched: 1945
- In service: 1948
- Out of service: 1978
- Fate: Sold in 1978 to the Paeroa Historic Maritime Park. Scrapped at an unknown date

General characteristics
- Displacement: 125 tons standard
- Length: 23 m (75 ft)
- Beam: 5.6 m (18 ft)
- Propulsion: 320 hp (240 kW) diesel, 1 shaft
- Speed: 10 knots (19 km/h; 12 mph)
- Complement: 4

HMNZS Manawanui was a naval tug which was modified for use as a diving tender by the Royal New Zealand Navy (RNZN). Originally intended for service with the United States Navy as a tug, the vessel was built in 1945 and transferred to the New Zealand Marine Department, which employed her in Waitemata Harbour before transferring the ship to the RNZN in 1948. She was converted to a diving tender in 1953 and served out her time in the RNZN in this role, before being decommissioned in 1978 and sold to the Paeroa Historic Maritime Park. The engine is now on display at the Whangarei Stationary Engine Club.

== Construction and design ==
Manawanui was built in Auckland in 1945 by Steel Ships Ltd. Displacing 125 tons standard, the vessel was 23 m (75 ft) long and had a beam of 5.6 m (18 ft). Propulsion was provided by a single 320 hp (240 kW) diesel engine operating a single shaft, which produced a top speed of 10 knots (19 km/h; 12 mph). She had a crew of four.

== Operational history ==
The vessel was originally built for the United States Navy, and was designated as US Navy tug YLT622, but instead she was transferred to the New Zealand Marine Department who named her Tug 622 and used her to service the large post-war fleet of surplus ships scattered around Waitemata Harbour. In 1948, Tug 622 was transferred to the RNZN and became HMNZS Manawanui. Manawanui was the first of three boats with this name to serve in the New Zealand Navy. It is also a Māori word meaning "to be brave or steadfast".

In 1953, she was converted to a diving tender and functioned in this role for the next 15 years. In 1956, she assisted in recovering an Avenger aircraft that had ditched in Hauraki Gulf. In 1957, she towed the badly damaged patrol launch SDML P3561 off rocks near Rangipukea Island and beached her in a nearby bay. In 1958, she investigated the wreck of the coaster Holmglen off Timaru.

She was replaced as a diving tender by a specially modified Moa class boat with the same name in 1978. In November 1978, she was sold for a nominal sum, to the Paeroa Historic Maritime Park for preservation and display.

== See also ==
- Diving tenders of the Royal New Zealand Navy
