= Nippon Maru Memorial Park =

Park in Yokohama, Japan

Coordinates: 35.4537°N 139.6330°E

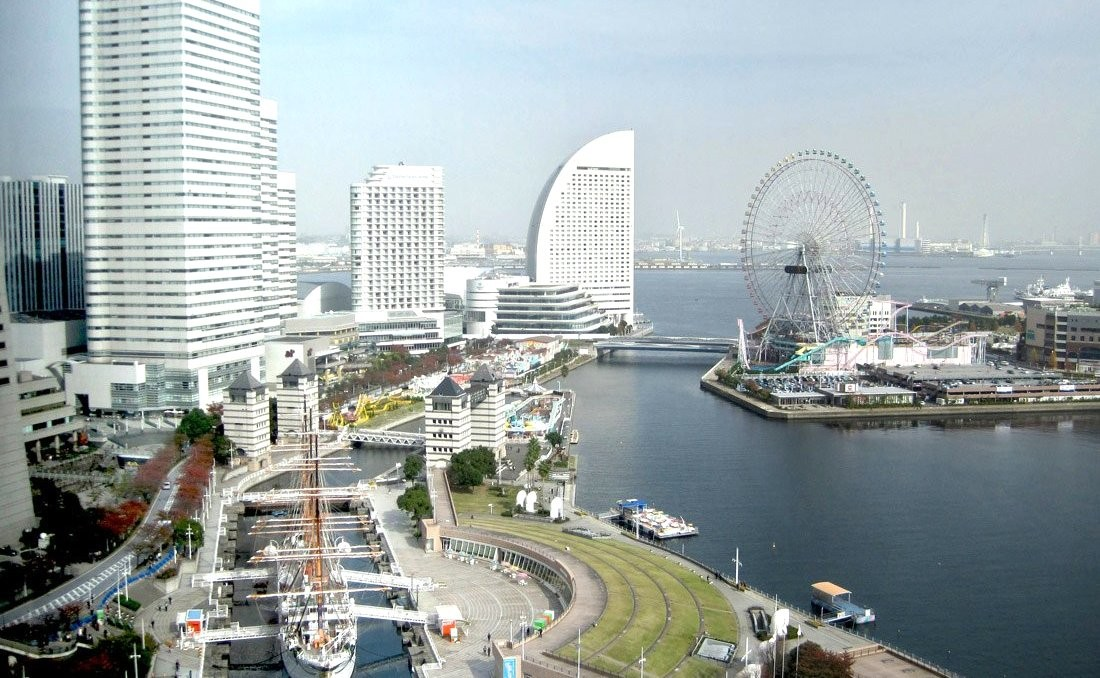
Nippon Maru Memorial Park

Nippon Maru Memorial Park (日本丸メモリアルパーク, Nippon Maru Memoriaru Pāku) is a park in Yokohama, Kanagawa Prefecture, Japan.
