= Chinese destroyer Xi'an =

A number of vessels of the People's Liberation Army Navy have borne the name Xi'an, after the capital Xi'an.

- Chinese destroyer Xi'an (106), a Type 051 destroyer, in service in 1972. Now preserved as a museum ship.
- Chinese destroyer Xi'an (153), a Type 052C destroyer, in service since 2015.
