= Chinese destroyer Nanning (1976) =

Type 051 destroyer of the PLA Navy

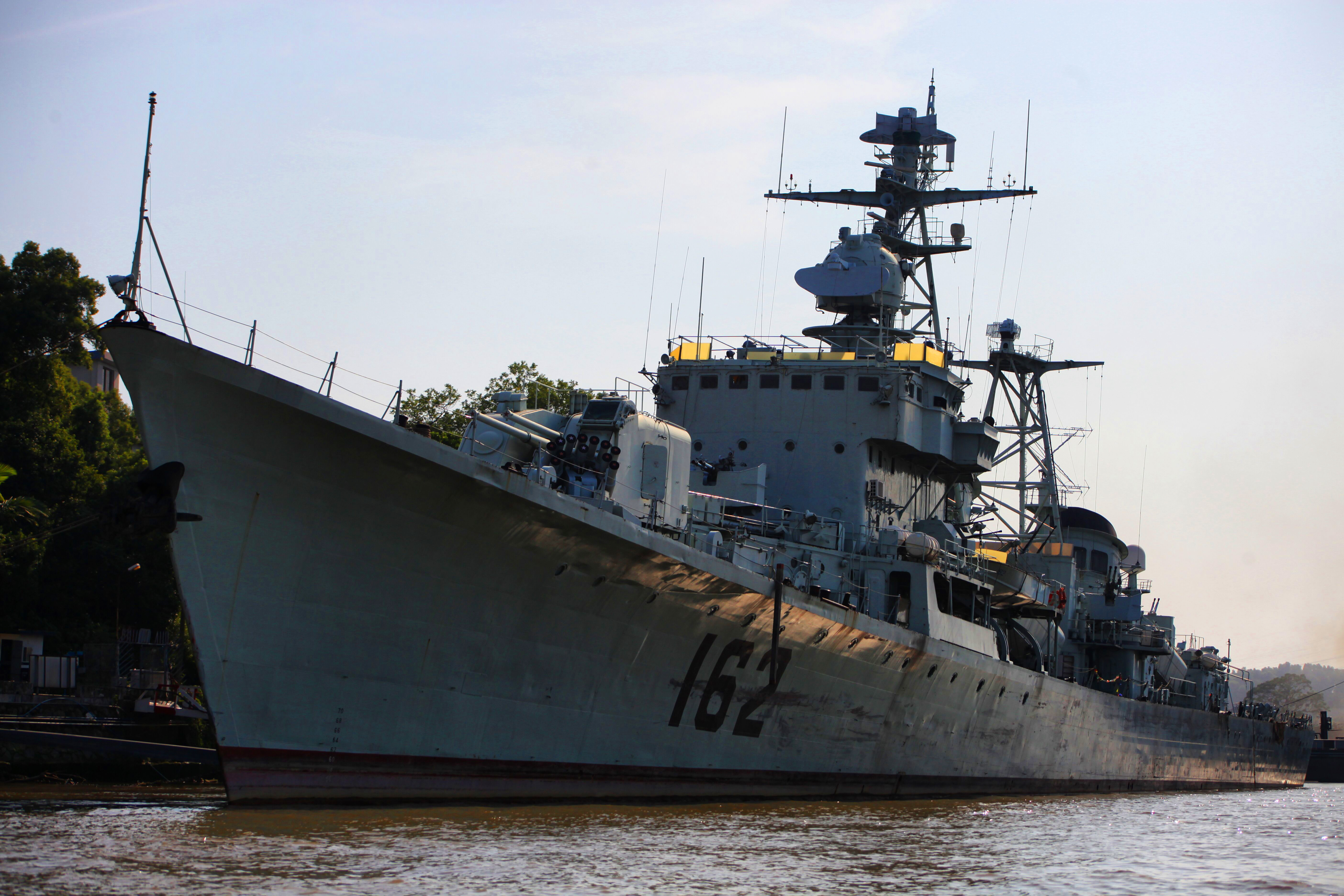
- Nanning in Huangpu on 5 February 2015

History

China
- Name: Nanning; (南宁)
- Namesake: Nanning
- Builder: Huangpu Shipyard, Shanghai
- Launched: 27 October 1976
- Commissioned: 23 March 1979
- Decommissioned: September 2012
- Identification: Pennant number: 162
- Status: Converted to surveillance ship

General characteristics
- Class & type: Type 051 destroyer
- Displacement: 3,670 tons
- Length: 132 m (433 ft 1 in)
- Beam: 12.8 m (42 ft 0 in)
- Draught: 4.6 m (15 ft 1 in)
- Propulsion: 2 steam turbines; 72,000 shp (53,700 kW)
- Speed: 32 knots (59 km/h)
- Range: 2,970 miles
- Complement: 280
- Armament: 16 anti-ship missiles; 8 surface-to-air missiles + 16 spare (manual reload); 2 twin-barrel 130 mm dual purpose guns; 4 Type 76A dual-37 mm anti-aircraft guns; 2 Type 75 anti-submarine rocket systems; 6 torpedo tubes; Depth charges; 38 naval mines

Nanning (162) is a Type 051 destroyer of the People's Liberation Army Navy.

== Development and design ==
The PLAN began designing a warship armed with guided missiles in 1960 based on the Soviet Neustrashimy, with features from the Kotlin-class destroyer, but the Sino-Soviet split stopped work. Work resumed in 1965 with nine ships being ordered.

== Construction and career ==
Nanning was launched on 27 October 1976 at the Huangpu Shipyard in Shanghai. Commissioned on 23 March 1979.

She was decommissioned in September 2012 and converted to a maritime surveillance patrol ship.
