= Chinese destroyer Guangzhou =

A number of vessels of the People's Liberation Army Navy have borne the name Guangzhou, after the capital Guangzhou.

- Chinese destroyer Guangzhou (160), a Type 051 destroyer, in service in 1973–1978.
- Chinese destroyer Guangzhou (168), a Type 052B destroyer, in service since 2004.
