= Chinese ship Changsha =

A number of vessels of the People's Liberation Army Navy have borne the name Changsha, after the capital Changsha.

- Chinese escort ship Changsha, a former Japanese Type D escort ship seized in 1949.
- Chinese frigate Changsha, a Type 053H frigate, in service in 1975 until 2018. Later renamed to Jiujiang in 1981.
- Chinese destroyer Changsha (161), a Type 051 destroyer, in service in 1973. Possibly decommissioned.
- Chinese destroyer Changsha (173), a Type 052D destroyer, in service since 2015.
