= Chinese destroyer Dalian (110) =

Type 051 destroyer of the PLA Navy

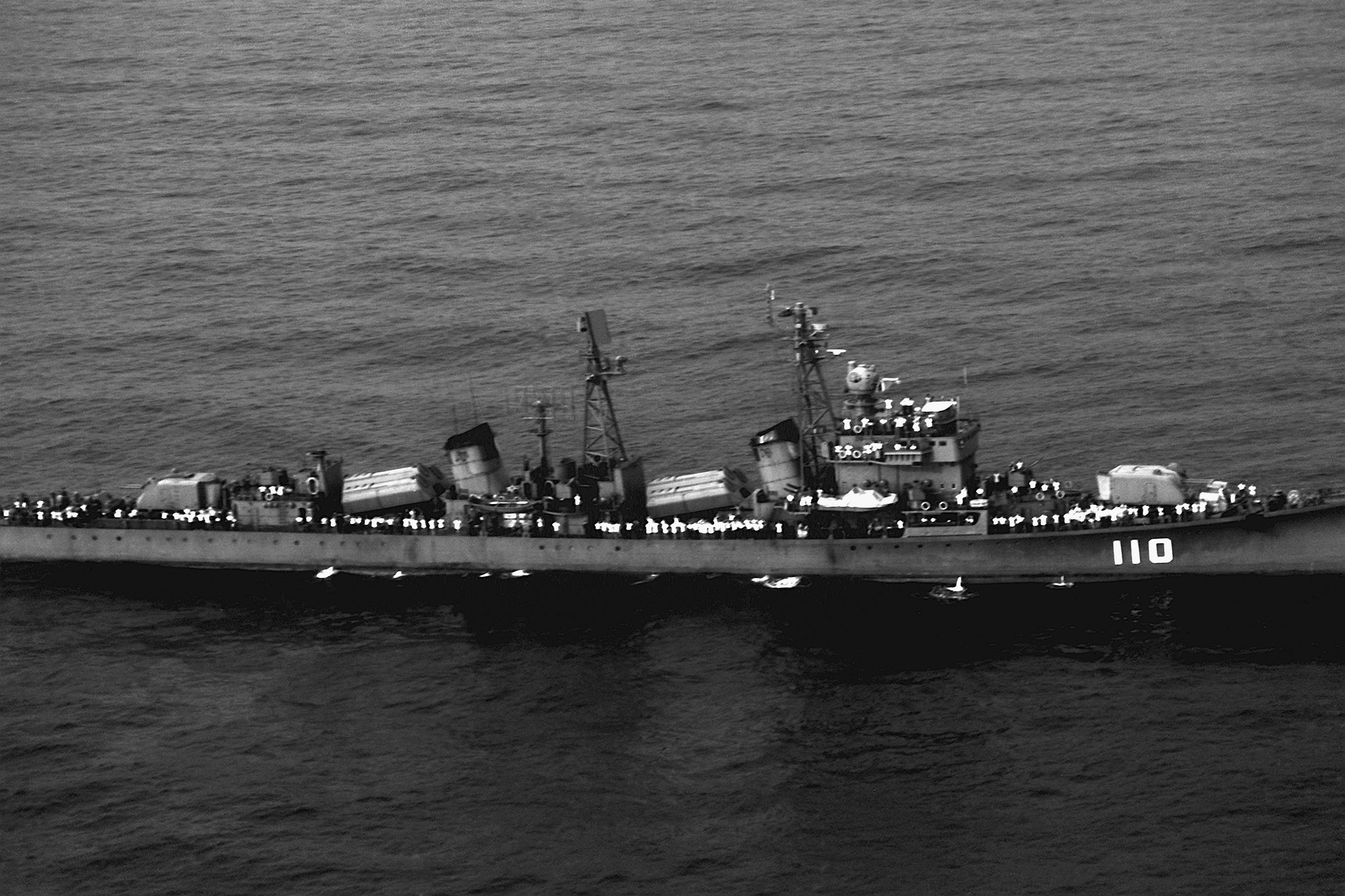
- Dalian on 1 January 1988

History

China
- Name: Dalian; (大连)
- Namesake: Dalian
- Builder: Hudong Shipyard, Shanghai
- Launched: 20 August 1981
- Commissioned: 26 December 1984
- Decommissioned: 16 May 2019
- Identification: Pennant number: 110
- Status: Museum ship in Liugong Island, Shandong

General characteristics
- Class & type: Type 051 destroyer
- Displacement: 3,670 tons
- Length: 132 m (433 ft 1 in)
- Beam: 12.8 m (42 ft 0 in)
- Draught: 4.6 m (15 ft 1 in)
- Propulsion: 2 steam turbines; 72,000 shp (53,700 kW)
- Speed: 32 knots (59 km/h)
- Range: 2,970 miles
- Complement: 280
- Armament: 16 anti-ship missiles; 8 surface-to-air missiles + 16 spare (manual reload); 2 twin-barrel 130 mm dual purpose guns; 4 Type 76A dual-37 mm anti-aircraft guns; 2 Type 75 anti-submarine rocket systems; 6 torpedo tubes; Depth charges; 38 naval mines

Dalian (110) is a former Type 051 destroyer of the People's Liberation Army Navy, since 2020 used as a museum ship.

== Development and design ==
The PLAN began designing a warship armed with guided missiles in 1960 based on the Soviet Neustrashimy, with features from the Kotlin-class destroyer, but the Sino-Soviet split stopped work. Work resumed in 1965 with nine ships being ordered. Construction started in 1968, with trials beginning in 1971. The ships nominally entered service in the early 1970s, but few were fully operational before 1985; workmanship was poor due to the Cultural Revolution.

Construction of the second batch began in 1977, with the last commissioning in 1991. The second batch may have been ordered due to the Cultural Revolution disrupting development of a successor class. These ships may be designated Type 051D. The PLAN initiated an abortive modernization program for the first batch in 1982. The ships would be reconstructed with British weapons and sensors acquired from British Aerospace. The Falklands War made the prospective upgrades less impressive and cost effective, and the project was cancelled in 1984. A 1986 upgrade project using American power plants, weapons, sensors, and computers was cancelled because of the 1989 Tiananmen Square protests and massacre.

== Construction and career ==
Dalian was launched on 20 August 1981 at the Huangpu Shipyard in Shanghai. Commissioned on 26 December 1984 into the North Sea Fleet.

Dalian initially received the Thomson-CSF Tavitac combat data system, the Type 393 surface search radar, and HQ-7 (Crotale derivative) surface-to-air missiles (SAM); the missiles replaced "X" turret. In 1999, YJ-8 missiles replaced the HY-series, and electronic warfare systems were upgraded. She was later equipped with YJ-83 anti-ship missiles. She was equipped with ZKJ-1 combat data system.

On 11 July 2017, Dalian conducted a live firing exercise in the Yellow Sea.

She was decommissioned on 16 May 2019.

On 1 September 2020, Dalian arrived at the Liugong Island Ferry Terminal in Weihai, to be permanently anchored and converted into a museum ship.
