= Chinese destroyer Zunyi =

Chinese ship Zunyi could refer to one of the following ships of the People's Liberation Army Navy which have been named for the city of Zunyi.

- Chinese destroyer Zunyi (134), a Type 051 destroyer commissioned in 1983 and retired in 2019
- Chinese destroyer Zunyi (107), a Type 055 destroyer commissioned in 2022
