= Chinese destroyer Xining =

A number of vessels of the People's Liberation Army Navy have borne the name Xining, after the capital Xining.

- Chinese destroyer Xining (108), a Type 051 destroyer in service from 1989 to 2013. Now a museum ship in Taizhou.
- Chinese destroyer Xining (117), a Type 052D destroyer, in service since 2017.
