= Chinese destroyer Changsha (161) =

Type 051 destroyer of the PLA Navy

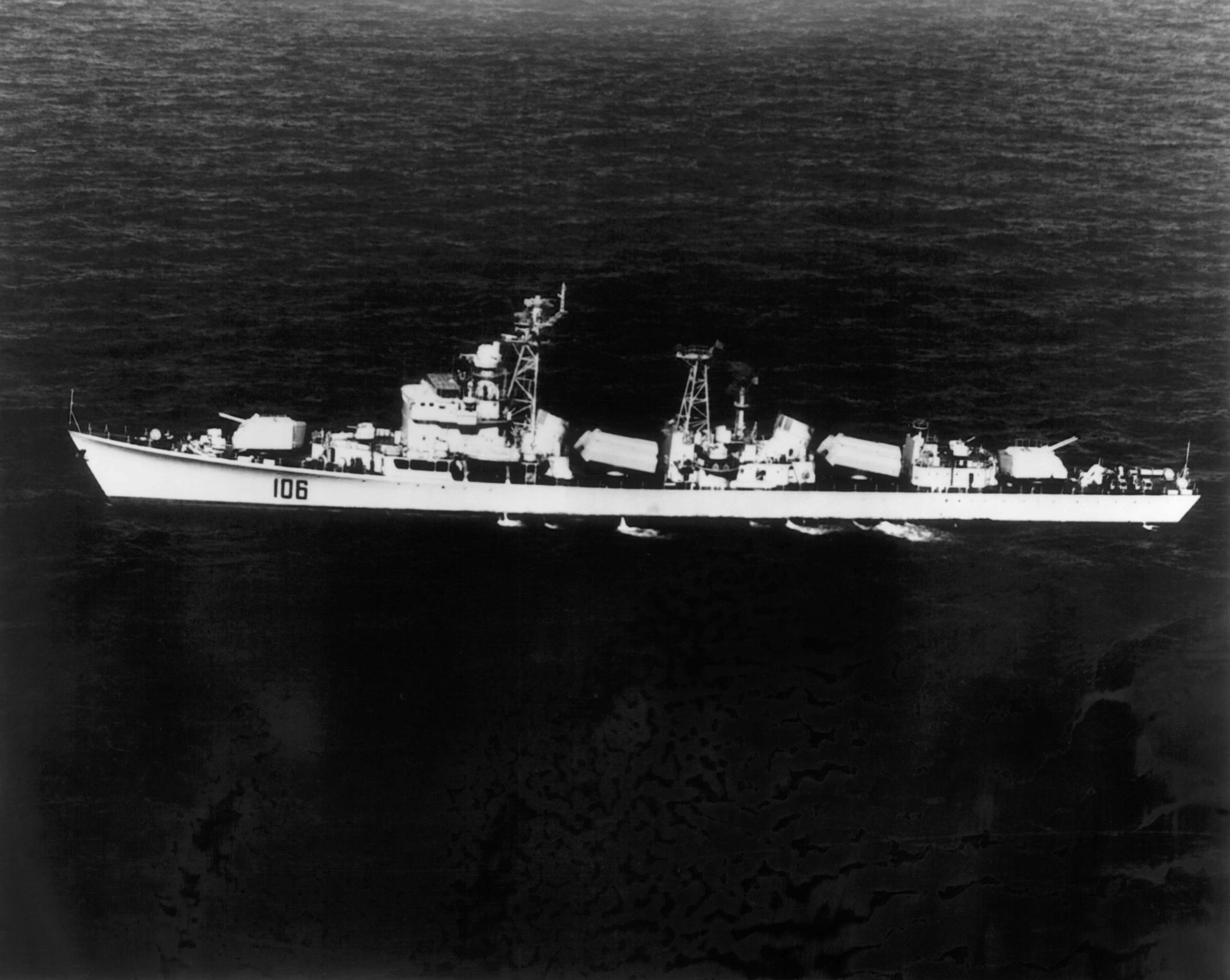
- Type 051 destroyer

History

China
- Name: Changsha; (长沙)
- Namesake: Changsha
- Builder: Hudong Shipyard, Shanghai
- Launched: 28 June 1973
- Commissioned: 31 December 1975
- Decommissioned: 26 August 2008
- Identification: Pennant number: 161
- Status: Decommissioned

General characteristics
- Class & type: Type 051 destroyer
- Displacement: 3,670 tons
- Length: 132 m (433 ft 1 in)
- Beam: 12.8 m (42 ft 0 in)
- Draught: 4.6 m (15 ft 1 in)
- Propulsion: 2 steam turbines; 72,000 shp (53,700 kW)
- Speed: 32 knots (59 km/h)
- Range: 2,970 miles
- Complement: 280
- Armament: 16 anti-ship missiles; 8 surface-to-air missiles + 16 spare (manual reload); 2 twin-barrel 130 mm dual purpose guns; 4 Type 76A dual-37 mm anti-aircraft guns; 2 Type 75 anti-submarine rocket systems; 6 torpedo tubes; Depth charges; 38 naval mines

Changsha (161) is a Type 051 destroyer of the People's Liberation Army Navy.

== Development and design ==
The PLAN began designing a warship armed with guided missiles in 1960 based on the Soviet Neustrashimy, with features from the Kotlin-class destroyer, but the Sino-Soviet split stopped work. Work resumed in 1965 with nine ships being ordered.

== Construction and career ==
Changsha was launched on 28 June 1973 at the Hudong Shipyard in Shanghai. Commissioned on 31 December 1978 into the South Sea Fleet.

She was decommissioned on 26 August 2008. Used as a test ship for the North Sea Fleet.
