= Chinese destroyer Kaifeng =

Type 051 destroyer of the PLA Navy

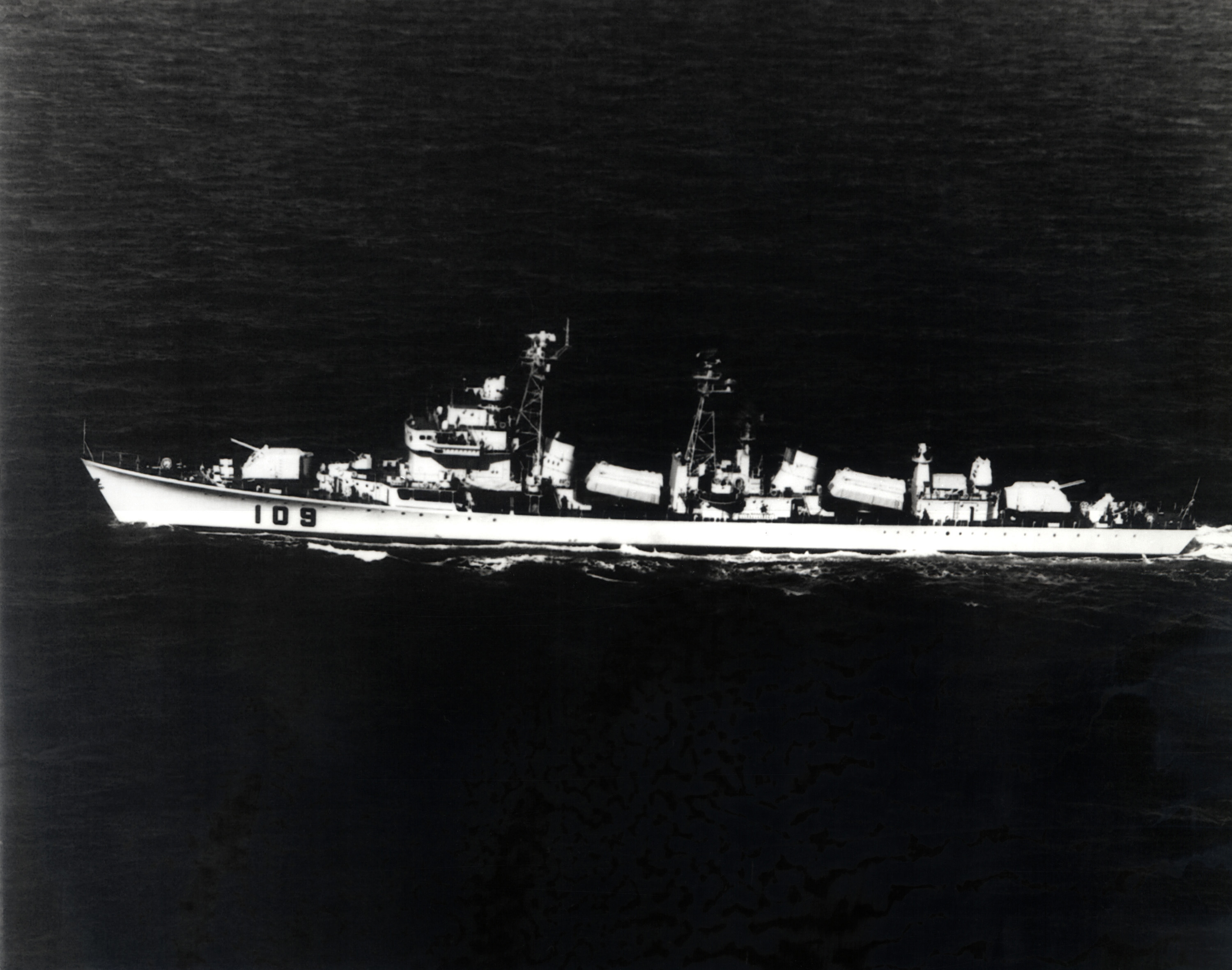
- Kaifeng on 1 May 1993

History

China
- Name: Kaifeng; (开封)
- Namesake: Kaifeng
- Builder: Dalian Shipyard, Liaoning
- Launched: 3 November 1979
- Commissioned: 25 December 1982
- Decommissioned: 16 May 2019
- Identification: Pennant number: 109
- Status: Decommissioned

General characteristics
- Class & type: Type 051 destroyer
- Displacement: 3,670 tons
- Length: 132 m (433 ft 1 in)
- Beam: 12.8 m (42 ft 0 in)
- Draught: 4.6 m (15 ft 1 in)
- Propulsion: 2 steam turbines; 72,000 shp (53,700 kW)
- Speed: 32 knots (59 km/h)
- Range: 2,970 miles
- Complement: 280
- Armament: 16 anti-ship missiles; 8 surface-to-air missiles + 16 spare (manual reload); 2 twin-barrel 130 mm dual purpose guns; 4 Type 76A dual-37 mm anti-aircraft guns; 2 Type 75 anti-submarine rocket systems; 6 torpedo tubes; Depth charges; 38 naval mines

Kaifeng (109) is a Type 051 destroyer of the People's Liberation Army Navy.

== Development and design ==
The PLAN began designing a warship armed with guided missiles in 1960 based on the Soviet Neustrashimy, with features from the Kotlin-class destroyer, but the Sino-Soviet split stopped work. Work resumed in 1965 with nine ships being ordered. Construction started in 1968, with trials beginning in 1971. The ships nominally entered service in the early 1970s, but few were fully operational before 1985; workmanship was poor due to the Cultural Revolution.

Construction of the second batch began in 1977, with the last commissioning in 1991. The second batch may have been ordered due to the Cultural Revolution disrupting development of a successor class. These ships may be designated Type 051D. The PLAN initiated an abortive modernization program for the first batch in 1982. The ships would be reconstructed with British weapons and sensors acquired from British Aerospace. The Falklands War made the prospective upgrades less impressive and cost effective, and the project was cancelled in 1984. A 1986 upgrade project using American power plants, weapons, sensors, and computers was cancelled because of the 1989 Tiananmen Square protests and massacre.

== Construction and career ==
Kaifeng was launched on 3 November 1979 at the Dalian Shipyard in Liaoning. Commissioned on 25 December 1982.

Kaifeng initially received the Thomson-CSF Tavitac combat data system, the Type 393 surface search radar, and HQ-7 (Crotale derivative) surface-to-air missiles (SAM); the missiles replaced "X" turret. In 1999, YJ-8 missiles replaced the HY-series, and electronic warfare systems were upgraded. She was later equipped with YJ-83 anti-ship missiles.

She was decommissioned on 16 May 2019.
