= Chinese destroyer Hefei =

A number of vessels of the People's Liberation Army Navy have borne the name Hefei, after the capital Hefei.

- Chinese destroyer Hefei (132), a Type 051Z destroyer. In service from 1980 until 2013.
- Chinese destroyer Hefei (174), a Type 052D destroyer, in service since 2015.
