= Chinese destroyer Xi'an (106) =

Type 051 destroyer of the PLA Navy

Coordinates: 30.5794460°N 114.2958960°E

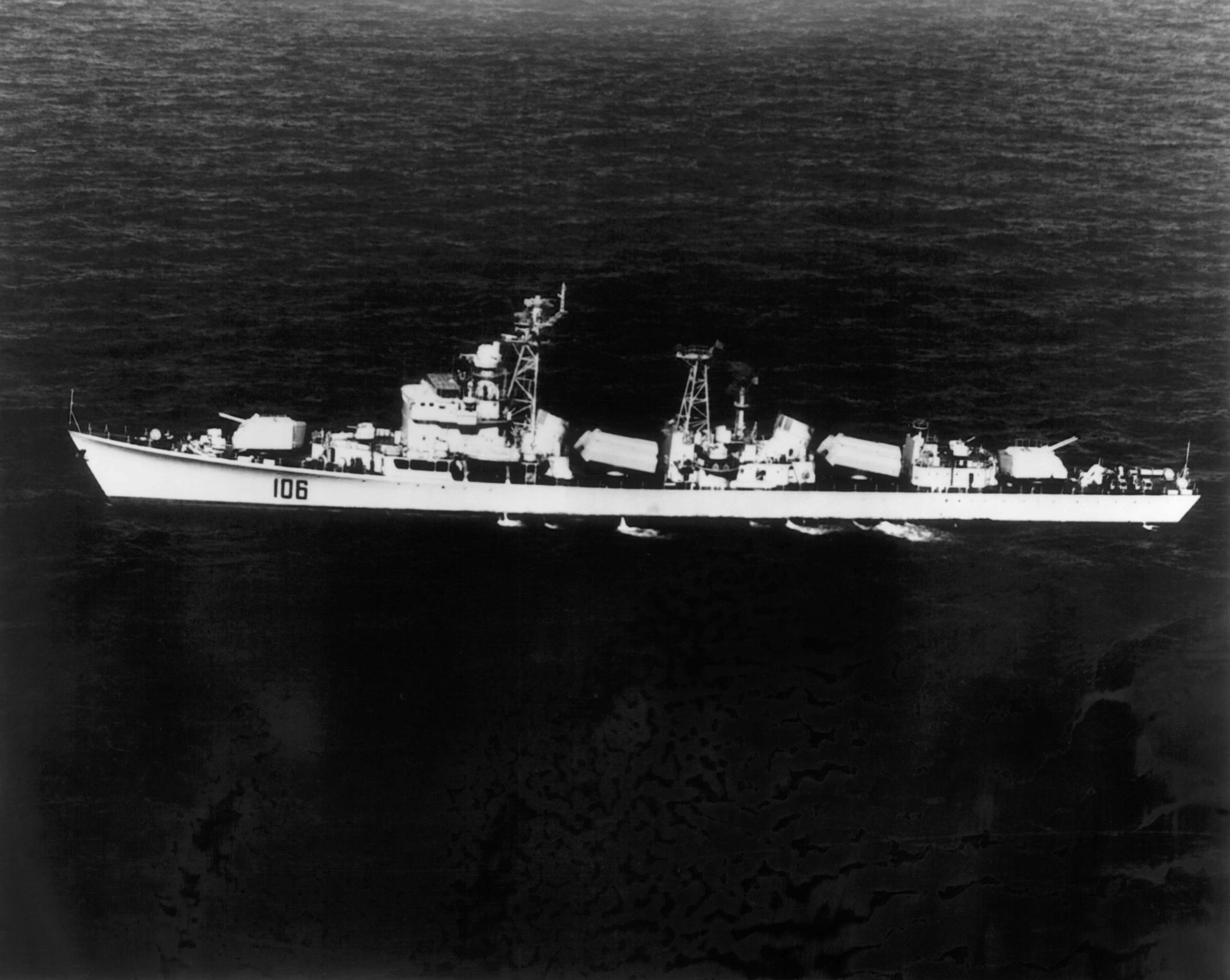
- Type 051 destroyer

History

China
- Name: Xi'an; (西安)
- Namesake: Xi'an
- Builder: Luda Shipyard, Liaoning
- Launched: September 1970
- Commissioned: 28 November 1974
- Decommissioned: 29 September 2007
- Identification: Pennant number: 106
- Status: Museum ship at Wuhan Science and Technology Museum, Wuhan

General characteristics
- Class & type: Type 051 destroyer
- Displacement: 3,670 tons
- Length: 132 m (433 ft 1 in)
- Beam: 12.8 m (42 ft 0 in)
- Draught: 4.6 m (15 ft 1 in)
- Propulsion: 2 steam turbines; 72,000 shp (53,700 kW)
- Speed: 32 knots (59 km/h)
- Range: 2,970 miles
- Complement: 280
- Armament: 16 anti-ship missiles; 8 surface-to-air missiles + 16 spare (manual reload); 2 twin-barrel 130 mm dual purpose guns; 4 Type 76A dual-37 mm anti-aircraft guns; 2 Type 75 anti-submarine rocket systems; 6 torpedo tubes; Depth charges; 38 naval mines

Xi'an (106) is a Type 051 destroyer of the People's Liberation Army Navy.

== Development and design ==
The PLAN began designing a warship armed with guided missiles in 1960 based on the Soviet Neustrashimy, with features from the Kotlin-class destroyer, but the Sino-Soviet split stopped work. Work resumed in 1965 with nine ships being ordered.

== Construction and career ==
Xi'an was launched in September 1970 at the Luda Shipyard in Shanghai. Commissioned on 28 November 1974.

She was decommissioned on 29 September 2007 and towed to Wuhan Science and Technology Museum, Wuhan to serve as a museum ship.
