= Chinese destroyer Guangzhou (160) =

Type 051 destroyer of the PLA Navy

History

China
- Name: Guangzhou; (广州)
- Namesake: Guangzhou
- Builder: Hudong Shipyard, Shanghai
- Launched: 28 April 1971
- Commissioned: 30 June 1974
- Identification: Pennant number: 160
- Fate: Scrapped

General characteristics
- Class & type: Type 051 destroyer
- Displacement: 3,670 tons
- Length: 132 m (433 ft 1 in)
- Beam: 12.8 m (42 ft 0 in)
- Draught: 4.6 m (15 ft 1 in)
- Propulsion: 2 steam turbines; 72,000 shp (53,700 kW)
- Speed: 32 knots (59 km/h)
- Range: 2,970 miles
- Complement: 280
- Armament: 16 anti-ship missiles; 8 surface-to-air missiles + 16 spare (manual reload); 2 twin-barrel 130 mm dual purpose guns; 4 Type 76A dual-37 mm anti-aircraft guns; 2 Type 75 anti-submarine rocket systems; 6 torpedo tubes; Depth charges; 38 naval mines

Guangzhou (160) was a Type 051 destroyer of the People's Liberation Army Navy.

== Development and design ==
The PLAN began designing a warship armed with guided missiles in 1960 based on the Soviet Neustrashimy, with features from the Kotlin-class destroyer, but the Sino-Soviet split stopped work. Work resumed in 1965 with nine ships being ordered.

== Construction and career ==
Guangzhou was launched on 28 April 1971 at the Hudong Shipyard in Shanghai. Commissioned on 30 June 1974 into the South Sea Fleet.

=== Explosion in 1978 ===
On 9 March 1978, at 8:40pm, while the ship was docked in Zhanjiang Port, Guangdong Province, an explosion rocked it. It sank by 10:55pm.

After nearly half a year of investigation by a joint team of the General Staff, Navy, and Fleet, the explosion was found to have been caused by a lieutenant cadre, Lai Sanyang (赖三羊), who worked in the armory. Lai had been involved with a woman before joining the Navy but broke off with her after becoming an officer. She then committed suicide. Her family subsequently attempted to raise charges against Lai, so the Political Department of the detachment decided that Lai should be dismissed and demobilized. (An alternate theory postulates that Lai was, in fact, a suspect for murdering the woman and had been suspended from duty instead of fully dismissed pending further investigation) But Lai begged his superiors not to demobilize him, as he would be forced to return to his hometown; he had become hated there due to the suicide.

After dismissing Lai Sanyang as a cadre, the unit did not immediately demobilize him. Lai was in charge of sea mines, depth charges, underwater weapons, and the key to the armory. Following his dismissal, Lai hid in the ammunition depot and detonated the depth charges, sinking the ship. How he achieved this was debated. He either tampered with the mechanism on the charge or bored a hole through the hull of the ship, which caused water to rush in and detonate the depth charges.

==== Aftermath ====
The sinking of the Guangzhou drowned 134 sailors who went down with the ship and injured 28. A tomb was selected for re-burying at a place about 10 meters away from the monument to the ship. In the following days, naval divers continued to retrieve the remains of their comrades in the sea. Afterward, statistics showed that more than 20 relatively complete remains and six large bags of incomplete remains were collected. 11 Type 56 assault rifles, 9 Type 54 pistols, and a batch of precision instruments were salvaged.

In 1979, a tugboat located the wreck and towed the ship for scrap. Her stern was cut and converted to a floating dock.
