= Chinese destroyer Nanning =

A number of vessels of the People's Liberation Army Navy have borne the name Nanning, after the city Nanning.

- Chinese destroyer Nanning (1976), a Type 051 destroyer, in service in 1973. Now used as surveillance ship.
- Chinese destroyer Nanning (2019), a Type 052D destroyer, in service since 2021.
