= Chinese destroyer Xining (108) =

Type 051 destroyer of the PLA Navy

Coordinates: 32.2452796°N 119.8918593°E

- Xining underway on 23 April 2009

History

China
- Name: Xining; (西宁)
- Namesake: Jinan
- Builder: Luda Shipyard, Liaoning
- Launched: 16 October 1978
- Commissioned: 29 January 1980
- Decommissioned: 25 September 2013
- Identification: Pennant number: 108
- Status: Museum ship at Taizhou Naval Museum, Taizhou

General characteristics
- Class & type: Type 051 destroyer
- Displacement: 3,670 tons
- Length: 132 m (433 ft 1 in)
- Beam: 12.8 m (42 ft 0 in)
- Draught: 4.6 m (15 ft 1 in)
- Propulsion: 2 steam turbines; 72,000 shp (53,700 kW)
- Speed: 32 knots (59 km/h)
- Range: 2,970 miles
- Complement: 280
- Armament: 16 anti-ship missiles; 8 surface-to-air missiles + 16 spare (manual reload); 2 twin-barrel 130 mm dual purpose guns; 4 Type 76A dual-37 mm anti-aircraft guns; 2 Type 75 anti-submarine rocket systems; 6 torpedo tubes; Depth charges; 38 naval mines

Xining (108) is a Type 051 destroyer of the People's Liberation Army Navy.

== Development and design ==
The PLAN began designing a warship armed with guided missiles in 1960 based on the Soviet Neustrashimy, with features from the Kotlin-class destroyer, but the Sino-Soviet split stopped work. Work resumed in 1965 with nine ships being ordered. Construction started in 1968, with trials beginning in 1971. The ships nominally entered service in the early 1970s, but few were fully operational before 1985; workmanship was poor due to the Cultural Revolution.

Construction of the second batch began in 1977, with the last commissioning in 1991. The second batch may have been ordered due to the Cultural Revolution disrupting the development of a successor class. These ships may be designated Type 051D. The PLAN initiated an abortive modernization program for the first batch in 1982. The ships would be reconstructed with British weapons and sensors acquired from British Aerospace. The Falklands War made the prospective upgrades less impressive and cost effective, and the project was cancelled in 1984. A 1986 upgrade project using American power plants, weapons, sensors, and computers was cancelled because of the 1989 Tiananmen Square protests and massacre.

== Construction and career ==
Xining was launched on 16 October 1978 at the Luda Shipyard in Shanghai. Commissioned on 29 January 1980.

She was decommissioned on 25 September 2013 and currently she lies at Taizhou Naval Museum, Taizhou as a museum ship near the Taizhou Yangtze River Bridge.
