= ORP Warszawa (1970) =

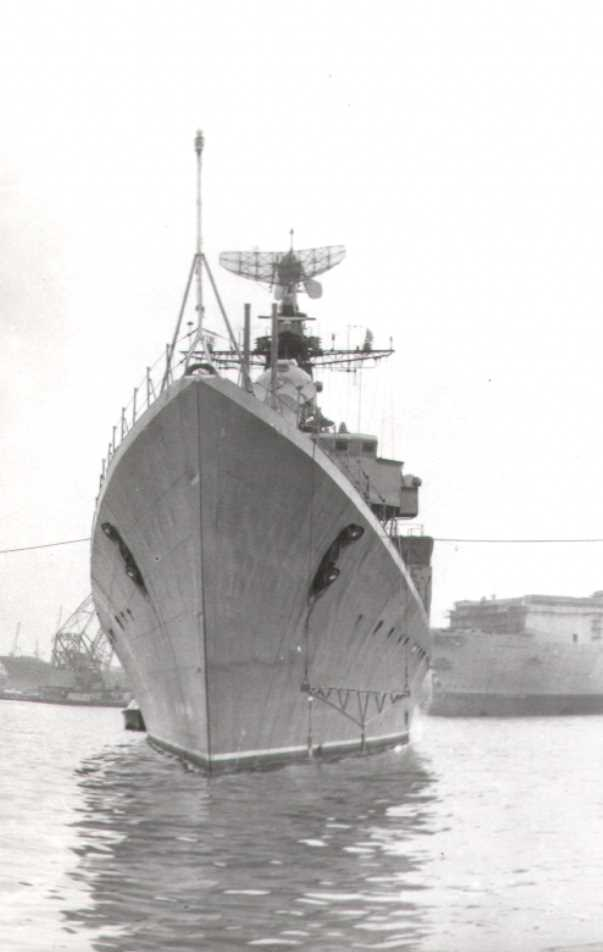
- ORP Warszawa

History

Soviet Union
- Name: Spravedlivy; Справедливый
- Namesake: Just in Russian
- Builder: Zhdanov, Leningrad
- Laid down: 25 December 1954
- Launched: 12 April 1956
- Commissioned: 20 December 1956
- Fate: Transferred to Poland 25 June 1970

Poland
- Name: ORP Warszawa
- Namesake: Warsaw
- Acquired: 25 June 1970
- Decommissioned: 31 January 1986

General characteristics
- Class & type: Kotlin-class destroyer
- Displacement: 2,662 t standard; 3230 t full load
- Length: 126.1 m (413 ft 9 in)
- Beam: 12.7 m (41 ft 8 in)
- Draught: 4.19 m (13 ft 9 in)
- Propulsion: 2× shaft geared steam turbines, 4 boilers, 72,000 shp (54 MW)
- Speed: 38 kn (70 km/h; 44 mph)
- Range: 1,050 nmi (1,940 km; 1,210 mi) at 36 kn (67 km/h; 41 mph); 3,600 nmi (6,700 km; 4,100 mi) at 18 kn (33 km/h; 21 mph)
- Complement: 285
- Sensors & processing systems: Radar: Fut -N (air search), Ryf (surface); Sonar: Pegas
- Armament: Original; 4× 130 mm (5.1 in) guns (2×2); 16 × 45 mm (1.8 in) (4×4); 10 × 533 mm (20 in) torpedo tubes (2×5); 6 depth charge throwers (later replaced by ASW mortars); 50× mines; Project 56AE; 1× twin S-125 Neva/Pechora (NATO SA-N-1) SAM (16 missiles); 2× 130 mm (5.1 in) guns (1×2); 4 × 45 mm (1.8 in) (1×4); 5 × 533 mm (20 in) torpedo tubes (1×5); 2× RBU-2500 ASW rocket launchers

ORP Warszawa was a Kotlin-class destroyer. Built in Leningrad in the 1950s, she was originally named Spravedlivy in the Soviet Navy. She was later transferred to the Polish Navy in 1970, the only ship of this class to be so transferred. She served until 1986 when the vessel was decommissioned.
