= Soviet destroyer Neustrashimy =

Soviet Navy prototype destroyer

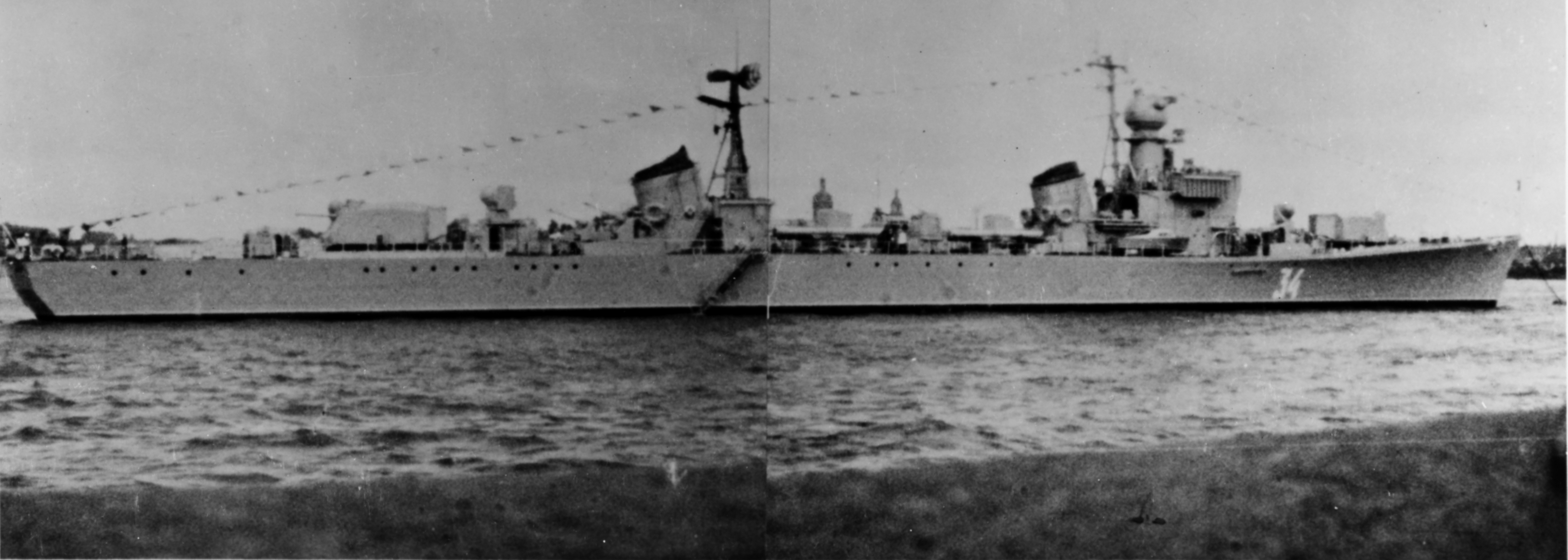
- Neustrashimy at anchor in Leningrad, 1955

Class overview
- Name: Neustrashimy
- Builders: Zhdanov Shipyard
- Operators: Soviet Navy
- Preceded by: Skory class
- Succeeded by: Kotlin class
- Built: 1950–1952
- In commission: 1955–1974
- Completed: 1
- Retired: 1

History

Soviet Union
- Name: Neustrashimy
- Builder: Zhdanov Shipyard
- Laid down: 1950
- Launched: 29 January 1951
- Commissioned: 31 January 1955
- Decommissioned: February 1974

General characteristics
- Type: Destroyer
- Displacement: 3100 tons (standard), 3,830 tons (full load)
- Length: 133.83 m (439.1 ft)
- Beam: 13.57 m (44.5 ft)
- Draught: 4.42 m (14.5 ft)
- Propulsion: 2× shaft geared steam turbines, 4 boilers, 66,000 hp
- Speed: 36 knots (67 km/h; 41 mph)
- Complement: 305
- Sensors & processing systems: Radar: Fut -N (air search), Ryf (surface); Sonar: Pegas
- Armament: 4 × 130 mm dual-purpose guns (2×2); 8 × 45 mm (2×4); 10 × 533 mm torpedo tubes (2×5); 2 anti-submarine mortars; 6 depth charge throwers (105 depth charges); 50 mines

Neustrashimy (Неустрашимый, Dauntless) was a destroyer built for the Soviet Navy in the early 1950s. She was to be the prototype for an extended production run but only one ship was built. Neustrashimy was considered too big for series production and a modified design; the Kotlin class was chosen for series production instead. The Soviet Designation was Project 41. This was the first Soviet ship to be given a NATO reporting name being called the Tallinn class.

The ship was built by Zhdanov Shipyard, Leningrad, laid down 1950, Launched 29 January 1951, on extended trials between 28 January 1952 and commissioning on 31 January 1955. She served in the Baltic Fleet and was decommissioned 22 February 1974.

== Design ==
This ship was the first true post war destroyer design, the Skoryy class being essentially a pre-war design.

=== Hull ===
The ship had a flushed deck design which enabled it to be fully closed down for nuclear, biological and chemical (NBC) warfare, with air conditioning and improved heating. Some armour (10–20 millimetres (0.39–0.79 in)) was fitted around the bridge and gun mountings. There were, however, some problems with seakeeping, particularly with the shape of the bow which led to the forward part of the ship being very wet.

=== Propulsion ===
The ship was fitted with a new high pressure steam turbine powerplant. The boilers and engine rooms were located in alternating spaces in a "unit machinery" arrangement. The boilers used forced draft to reach a pressure of 64 kg/cm^{2} (910 psi). The powerplant could be fired up without pre-heating and proved 20% more economical than that of the Skoryy-class ships. This basic machinery was used for most subsequent Soviet steam powered ships.

=== Armament ===
The gun armament comprised two stabilised, enclosed dual purpose 130-millimetre (5.1 in) mountings located in "A" and "Y" positions. Anti-aircraft artillery comprised four quad mountings with new 45 millimetres (1.8 in) automatic guns. Anti-submarine weapons comprised two RBU-2500 anti-submarine mortars. Two quintuple torpedo tubes and up to 50 mines were also fitted.

=== Sensors ===
It has Ryf surface search, Neptun Navigation and Fut air search radars. It also has the Pegas sonar. An initial combat information and control system Plashnet-41 was used.

== Luda-class DDG ==
According to Conway's All the World Fighting Ships 1947–1995 2nd edition, the Neustrashimy design was sold to China and became the basis for their Luda-class DDG. However, due to the external resemblance between the Luda and the Kotlin classes, many analysts today claim that the Luda class is based on the Kotlin.

== See also ==
- List of ships of the Soviet Navy
- List of ships of Russia by project number
