= Type 051 destroyer =

Class of guided missile destroyers fielded by the Chinese People's Liberation Army Navy

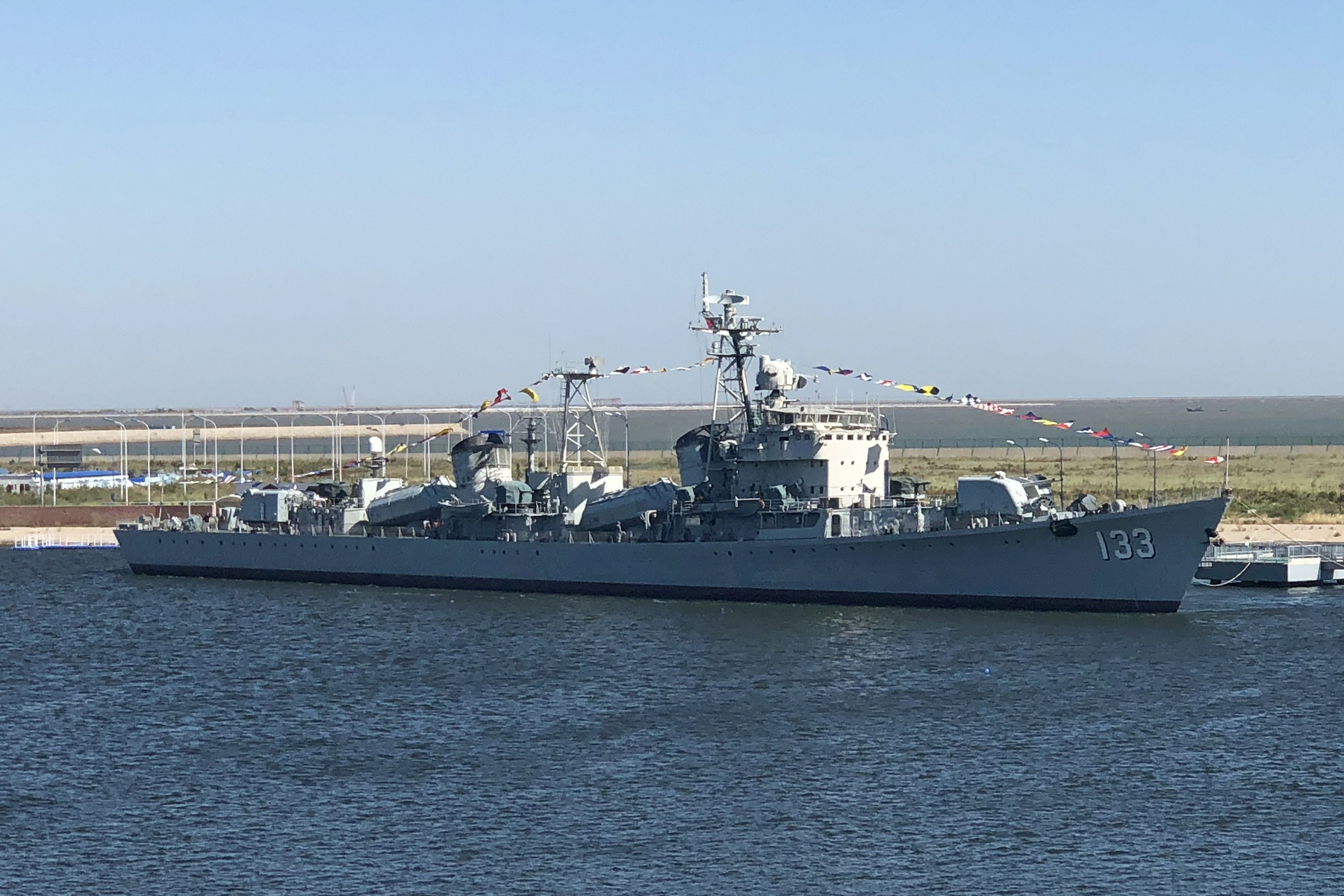
- Chongqing on 23 September 2018

Class overview
- Builders: Luda Shipyard; Zhonghua Shipyard
- Operators: People's Liberation Army Navy Surface Force
- Preceded by: Anshan class
- Succeeded by: Type 051B (based on hull family); Type 052 (based on commissioning date)
- Built: 1968–1991
- In service: 1971-2020
- Completed: 17
- Active: 0
- Retired: 17
- Preserved: 12

General characteristics
- Type: Destroyer
- Displacement: 3,670 tons
- Length: 132 m (433 ft 1 in)
- Beam: 12.8 m (42 ft 0 in)
- Draught: 4.6 m (15 ft 1 in)
- Propulsion: 2 steam turbines; 72,000 shp (53,700 kW)
- Speed: 32 knots (59 km/h)
- Range: 2,970 miles
- Complement: 280
- Armament: 2 × 3 HY-1 anti-ship missiles (most variants); 4 × 4 YJ-83 anti-ship cruise missiles (Dalian (110), 051DT, 051G); 8 × HQ-7 surface-to-air missiles + 16 spare (Dalian (110), 051DT, 051G); 2 × 2 Type 76 twin 130 mm dual purpose guns (most variants); 2 × 2 Type 79 100 mm naval guns (051G); 4 × 2 Type 76 twin 37 mm naval guns (051D, 051DT, 051G); 4 × 2 Type 66 twin 57 mm guns (051, 051Z); 4 × 2 Type 61 25 mm AAA guns; 2 × 12 Type 75 anti-submarine rocket systems; 2 × 3 324 mm anti-submarine torpedo tubes; 4 × Type 64 depth charges; 38 naval mines
- Aircraft carried: 1-2 helicopters: Harbin Z-9C ASW/SAR (Jinan (105), Luda II only)
- Aviation facilities: Hangar and flight deck; Landing assistance system

The Type 051 destroyer (NATO/OSD Luda-class destroyer) was a class of guided missile destroyers based on the hull of the Soviet Neustrashimy-class destroyer deployed by China. It was the first guided missile destroyer fielded by the People's Liberation Army Navy (PLAN), and the first designed and built in China. 17 were built from 1970 to 1990; it was not until the 21st century that China would again build a class in such large numbers.

NATO/OSD broadly grouped variants from refits and newer construction under the Luda I, Luda II, Luda III, and Luda IV classes.

== History ==
The PLAN began designing a warship armed with guided missiles in 1960 based on the Soviet destroyer Neustrashimy, with features from the Kotlin-class destroyer, but the Sino-Soviet split stopped work. Work resumed in 1965 with nine ships being ordered. Construction started in 1968, with trials beginning in 1971. The ships nominally entered service in the early 1970s, but few were fully operational before 1985; workmanship was poor due to the Cultural Revolution.

Construction of the second batch began in 1977, with the last commissioning in 1991. The second batch may have been ordered due to the Cultural Revolution disrupting development of a successor class. These ships may be designated Type 051D.

The PLAN initiated an abortive modernization program for the first batch in 1982. The ships would be reconstructed with British weapons and sensors acquired from British Aerospace. The Falklands War made the prospective upgrades less impressive and cost effective, and the project was cancelled in 1984. A 1986 upgrade project using American power plants, weapons, sensors, and computers was cancelled after the 1989 Tiananmen Square protests.

Jinan, the first of the class, became a trials ship in 1987; a helicopter hangar and flight deck replaced the rear armament. This configuration was referred to as Luda II.

The last two ships, Zhanjiang and Zhuhai, were upgraded with foreign – mainly French – systems, possibly being designated as Type 051G, and referred to as Luda III. They became test beds and many of the systems were later employed on the Type 052 and Type 051B destroyers. Both ships were decommissioned on 3 September 2020, being the last of their class to retire from service.

Twelve ships of the class – Jinan, Yinchuan, Nanjing, Nanchang, Chongqing, Xining, Zhanijiang, Zhuhai, Hefei, Zunyi, Dalian, and Xi'an – have been preserved as museum ships.

== Variants ==
=== Type 051 ===
The Type 051 was the initial design using Soviet or Soviet-derived systems.

The anti-ship missiles were P-15 Termit derivatives (HY-1, and possibly later HY-2) in two triple-launchers. Guns were two twin 130 mm (5 in) gun mounts (SM-2-1 derivatives), and four twin 37 mm (1.5 in) anti-aircraft guns.

Anti-submarine equipment were Soviet hull-mounted Pegas 2 and Tamir-2 sonars, depth charges, and FQF-2500 rocket launchers (Soviet RBU-1200 derivatives).

The Type 051 was according to NATO part of the Luda I class.

=== Type 051D ===
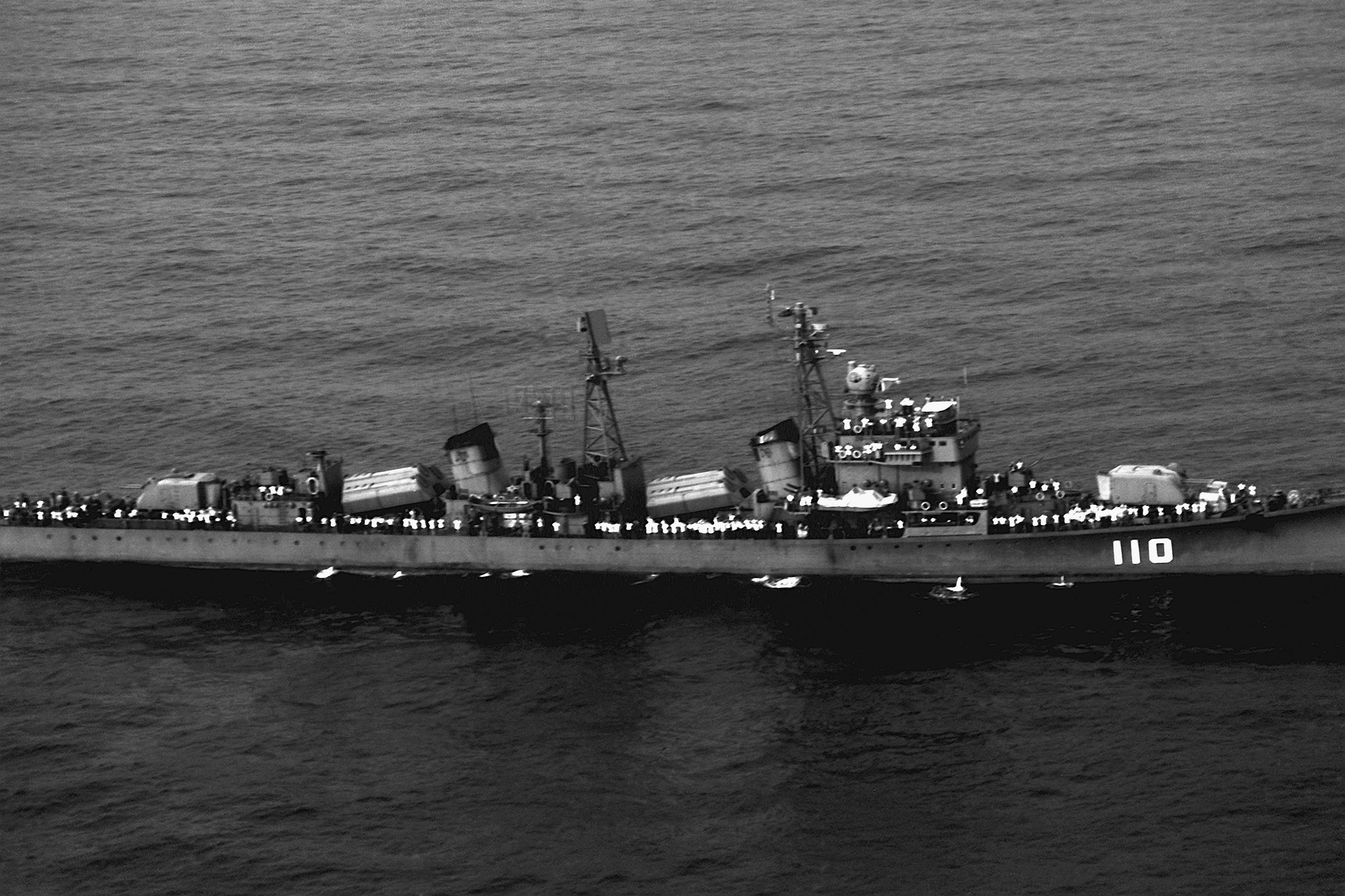
Dalian (110) before modernization.

The Type 051D was from the second batch. It had changes to electronics and was equipped for underway replenishment.

The Type 051D was according to NATO part of the Luda I class.

=== Type 051DT ===
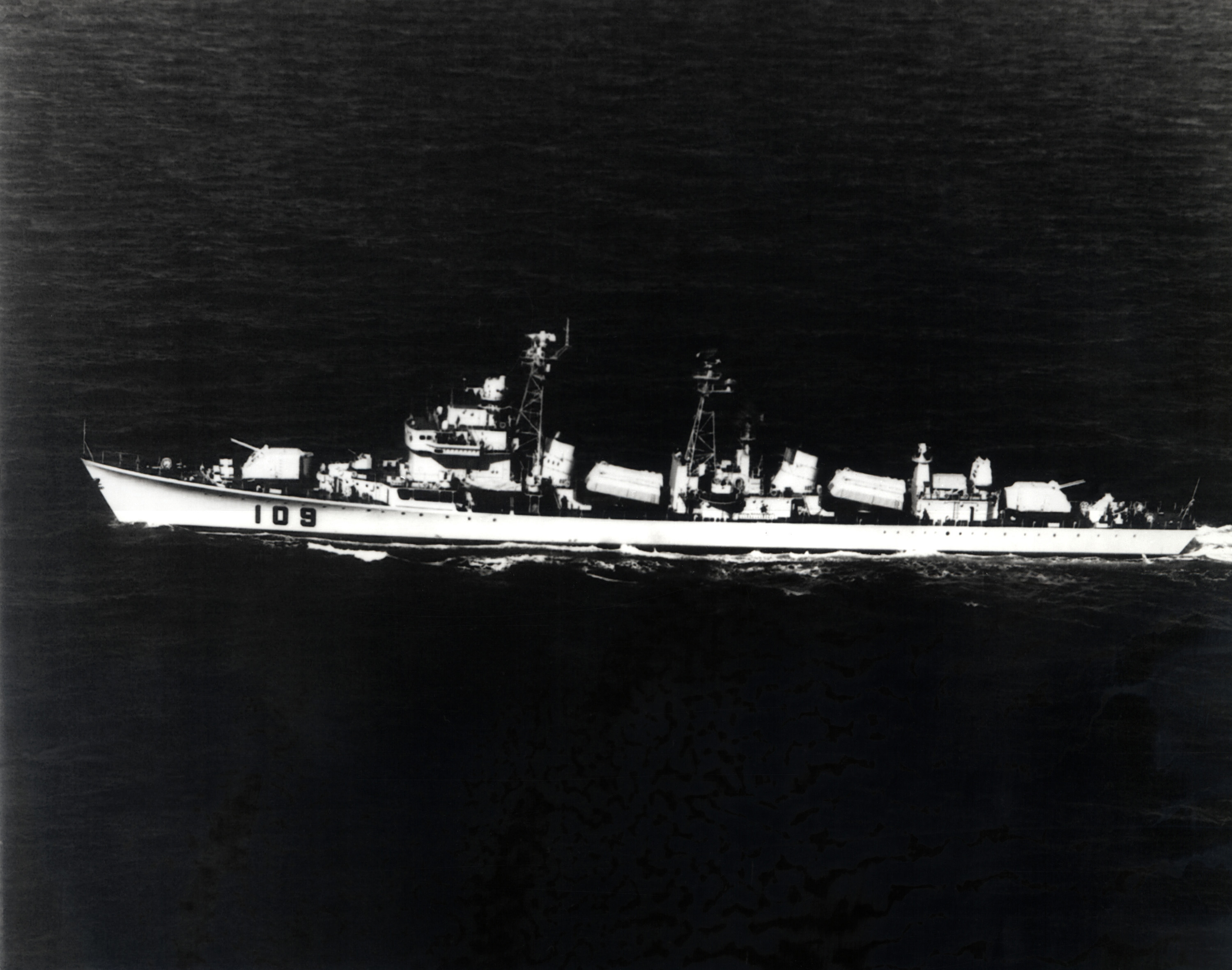
Kaifeng (109) with "X" turret replaced by HQ-7 launcher

The Type 051DT was a modernized Type 051D. Kaifeng and Dalian were modernized to somewhat different designs.

Kaifeng initially received the Thomson-CSF Tavitac combat data system, the Type 393 surface search radar, and HQ-7 (Crotale derivative) surface-to-air missiles (SAM); the missiles replaced "X" turret. In 1999, YJ-8 missiles replaced the HY-series, and electronic warfare systems were upgraded.

Dalian received a similar modernization as Kaifeng. A notable difference was Dalian used the ZKJ-1 combat data system, which was also used on the Type 051Z.

They were later equipped with YJ-83 anti-ship missiles.

The Type 051DT was according to NATO part of the Luda III class, and later the Luda IV class.

=== Type 051Z ===
The Type 051Z was a command variant with the ZKJ-1 combat data system. Anti-aircraft warfare capabilities were improved by replacing the 37 mm guns with Soviet 57 mm (2.2 in) guns, and fitting modern Type 381A 3D radar.

One Type 051D, Hefei, was converted to a Type 051Z.

The Type 051Z was according to NATO part of the Luda I class.

=== Helicopter destroyer variant ===
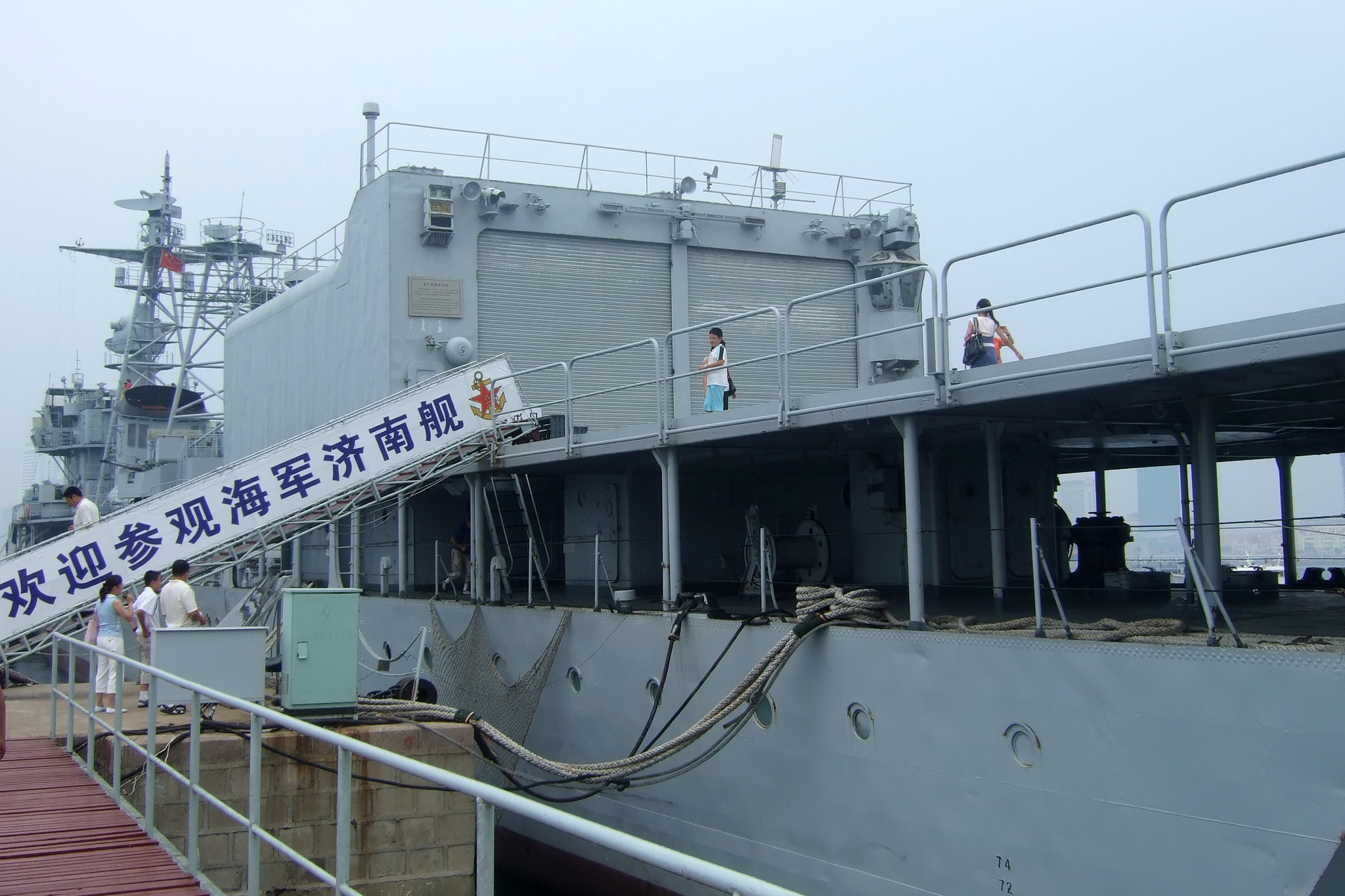
The helicopter hangar and flight deck on Jinan (105)

Jinan was a helicopter destroyer. The gun turrets aft of the aft missile launcher were replaced by a hangar and flight deck for two Harbin Z-9C helicopters.

One Type 051, Jinan, was converted into a "Luda II" in 1987 for trials.

=== Type 051G ===
The Type 051G was an improved variant to which design the last two ships, Zhanjiang and Zhuhai, were completed. They were equipped with Type 354 3D air and surface search radar. Four twin YJ-8 launchers replaced the HY-1/HY-2 launchers. The Soviet sonar was replaced by French DUBV-23 search sonar and DUBV-43 variable depth sonar (VDS).

Zhuhai was modified in 1999. The Soviet 130 mm guns were replaced by Type 79A 100 mm (4 in) guns, derived from French Creusot-Loire Compact, with automated reloaders. An HQ-7 SAM launcher replaced the "X" turret, as on the Type 051DT. Zhuhai was similarly modified.

Zhanjiang and Zhuhai were equipped with the ZKG-4A and ZKG-4B combat data systems respectively.

The Type 051G was also the first Chinese ship to deploy the YU-7 lightweight torpedo, and the Italian 40 mm (1.6 in) anti-aircraft gun.

The Type 051G was according to NATO part of the Luda III class, and later the Luda IV class.

== Ships of class ==
All these ships were built at three shipyards: (1) the Luda Shipyard (since 2000 called the Dalian Shipyard) in Liaoning, (2) the Zhonghua Shipyard (now called the Hudong-Zhonghua Shipyard) in Shanghai, and (3) the Huangpu Shipyard, in Guangzhou. The number in the first column is the order of completion.

Number	Hull no.	Name	Builder	Launched	Commissioned	Decommissioned	Fleet	Notes
Type 051
2	160	广州 / Guangzhou	Dalian	28 April 1971	30 June 1974	9 March 1978	South Sea Fleet	Suffered an explosion in 1978, as a result of which she was sunk, then raised and scrapped.
3	106	西安 / Xi'an	Luda	September 1970	28 November 1974	29 September 2007	North Sea Fleet	Preserved as museum ship.
4	161	长沙 / Changsha	Dalian	28 June 1973	31 December 1978	26 August 2008	South Sea Fleet	Inactive.
5	107	银川 / Yinchuan	Luda	30 July 1970	31 December 1971	15 November 2007	North Sea Fleet	Preserved as a museum ship.
6	162	南宁 / Nanning	Dalian	27 October 1976	23 March 1979	September 2012	South Sea Fleet	Inactive.
7	131	南京 / Nanjing	Zhonghua	11 December 1973	6 February 1977	26 September 2012	East Sea Fleet	Preserved as a museum ship.
Helicopter destroyer variant
1	105	济南 / Jinan	Luda	30 July 1970	31 December 1971	15 November 2007	North Sea Fleet	Built as Type 051. Converted in 1987. Preserved as a museum ship in Qingdao.
Type 051D
8	108	西宁 / Xining	Luda	16 October 1978	29 January 1980	25 September 2013	North Sea Fleet	Preserved as a museum ship.
11	163	南昌 / Nanchang	Zhonghua	22 December 1979	15 November 1982	26 September 2016	South Sea Fleet	Preserved as military tourist attraction in Nanchang, Jiangxi.
13	133	重庆 / Chongqing	Zhonghua	31 October 1980	15 November 1982	26 September 2014	East Sea Fleet	Preserved as military tourist attraction in Tianjin.
14	134	遵义 / Zunyi	Zhonghua	25 November 1983	28 December 1984	16 May 2019	North Sea Fleet	Preserved as a museum ship.
15	164	桂林 / Guilin	Dalian	20 June 1984	10 July 1987	16 May 2019	North Sea Fleet	Transferred from the South Sea Fleet. To be expended as target ship.
Type 051DT
10	109	开封 / Kaifeng	Luda	3 November 1979	25 December 1982	16 May 2019	North Sea Fleet	Built as Type 051D. Converted in 1999. To be expended as target ship.
12	110	大连 / Dalian	Luda	20 August 1981	26 December 1984	16 May 2019	North Sea Fleet	Built as Type 051D. Preserved as a museum ship.
Type 051Z
9	132	合肥 / Hefei	Zhonghua	November 1978	18 March 1980	25 September 2013	East Sea Fleet	Built as Type 051D. Preserved as a museum ship.
Type 051G
16	165	湛江 / Zhanjiang	Dalian	1 August 1988	30 December 1989	28 August 2020	South Sea Fleet	Inactive. Will be transformed into a museum ship.
17	166	珠海/ Zhuhai	Dalian	18 October 1990	21 November 1991	28 August 2020	South Sea Fleet	Inactive. Will be transformed into a museum ship.

== See also ==
- List of destroyer classes

Equivalent destroyers of the same era

- Gangwon class – Destroyers of the South Korean Navy
- Tachikaze class – Japanese guided missile destroyer class
- Type 42-class destroyer – British guided missile destroyer class
- Spruance class – Destroyer class of the US Navy
- Iroquois class – Class of guided missile destroyers
- Sovremenny class – Class of destroyer built for the Soviet Navy
- Audace class – Italian class of guided missile destroyers

== Bibliography ==
- Bussert, James; Elleman, Bruce (2011). People's Liberation Army Navy: Combat System Technology, 1949-2010. Naval Institute Press. ISBN 978-1591140801.
- Cole, Bernard D. (July 2017). "What Do China's Surface Fleet Developments Suggest about Its Maritime Strategy?". CSMI Red Book. 14. United States Naval War College. ISBN 978-1-935352-45-7.
- Faulkner, Keith (1999). Hutchinson, Robert (ed.). Jane's Warship Recognition Guide (2nd ed.). New York: Harper Collins Publishers. ISBN 0-00-4722116.
- Luda Class - Archive 6/2002 (Report). Forecast International. June 2001.
- Saunders, Stephan, ed. (2004). Jane's Fighting Ships 2004-2005. Jane's Information Group. ISBN 0-7106-2623-1.
- Saunders, Stephan, ed. (2009). Jane's Fighting Ships 2009-2010. Jane's Information Group. ISBN 978-0-7106-2888-6.
