= Dalian Shipbuilding Industry Company =

Part of China Shipbuilding Industry Corporation

Coordinates: 38.940919°N 121.60861°E

Dalian Shipbuilding Industry Company 大连船舶重工集团有限公司
- Type: State-owned enterprise
- Industry: Shipbuilding
- Founded: 1898; 128 years ago
- Headquarters: Dalian, Liaoning, China
- Key people: Liu Zheng (Chairman)
- Revenue: ▲CN¥20 billion
- Total assets: ▲CN¥100 billion
- Parent: China Shipbuilding Industry Corporation (merged into China State Shipbuilding Corporation)
- Website: www.dsic.cn

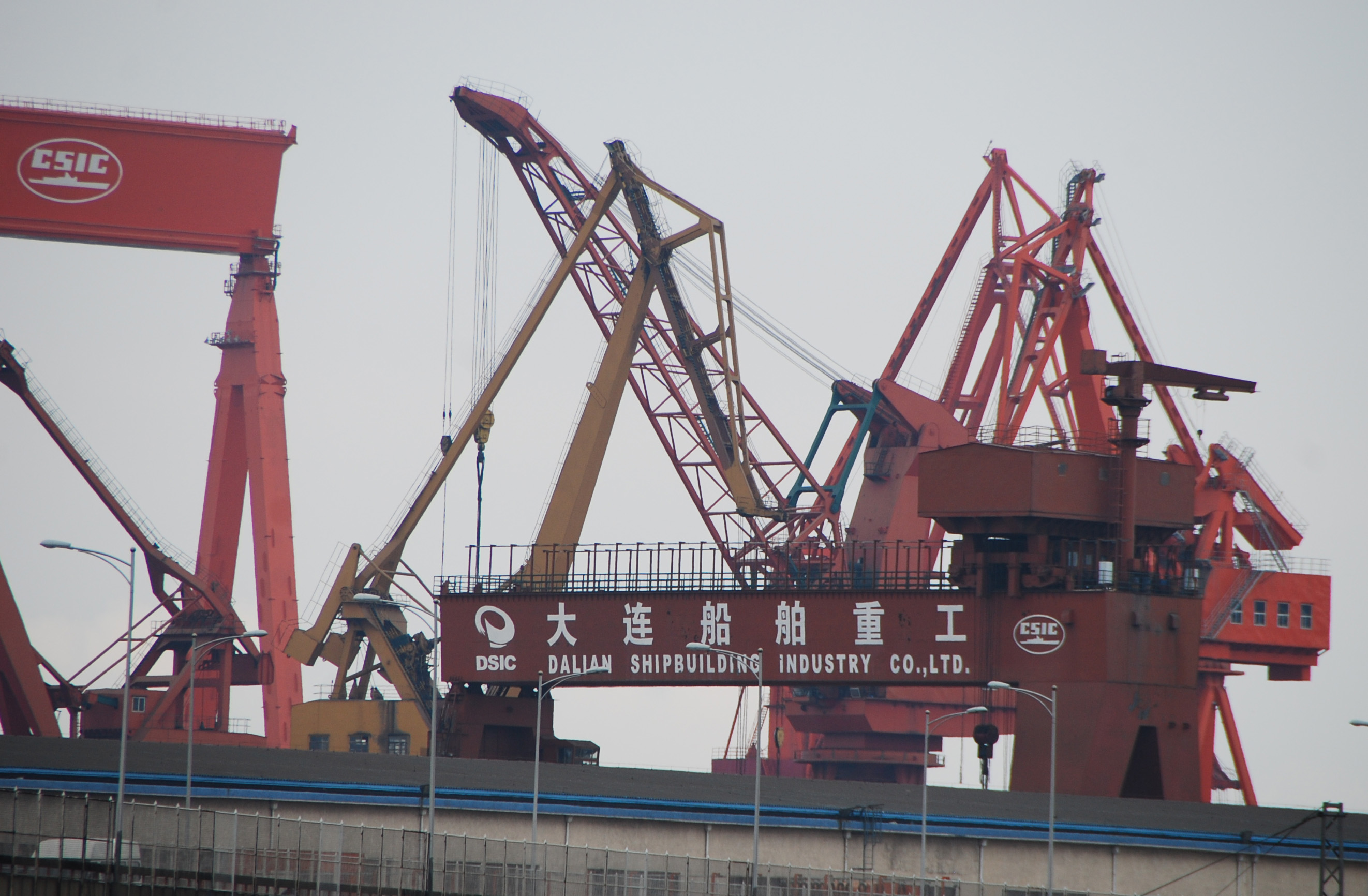
Dalian Shipbuilding Industry Company in Dalian, Liaoning, China

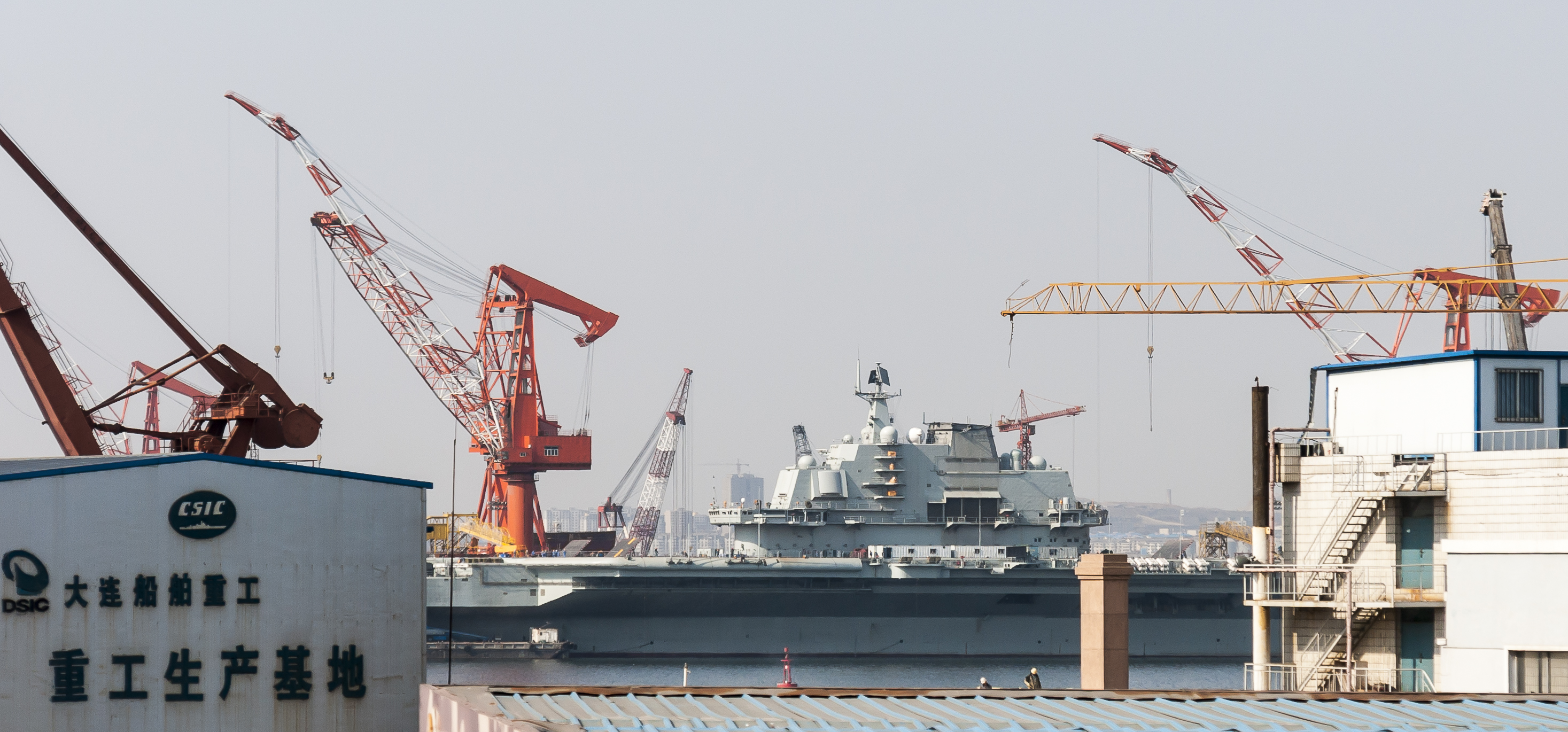
China's first aircraft carrier Liaoning under refit in Dalian Shipbuilding Industry Company

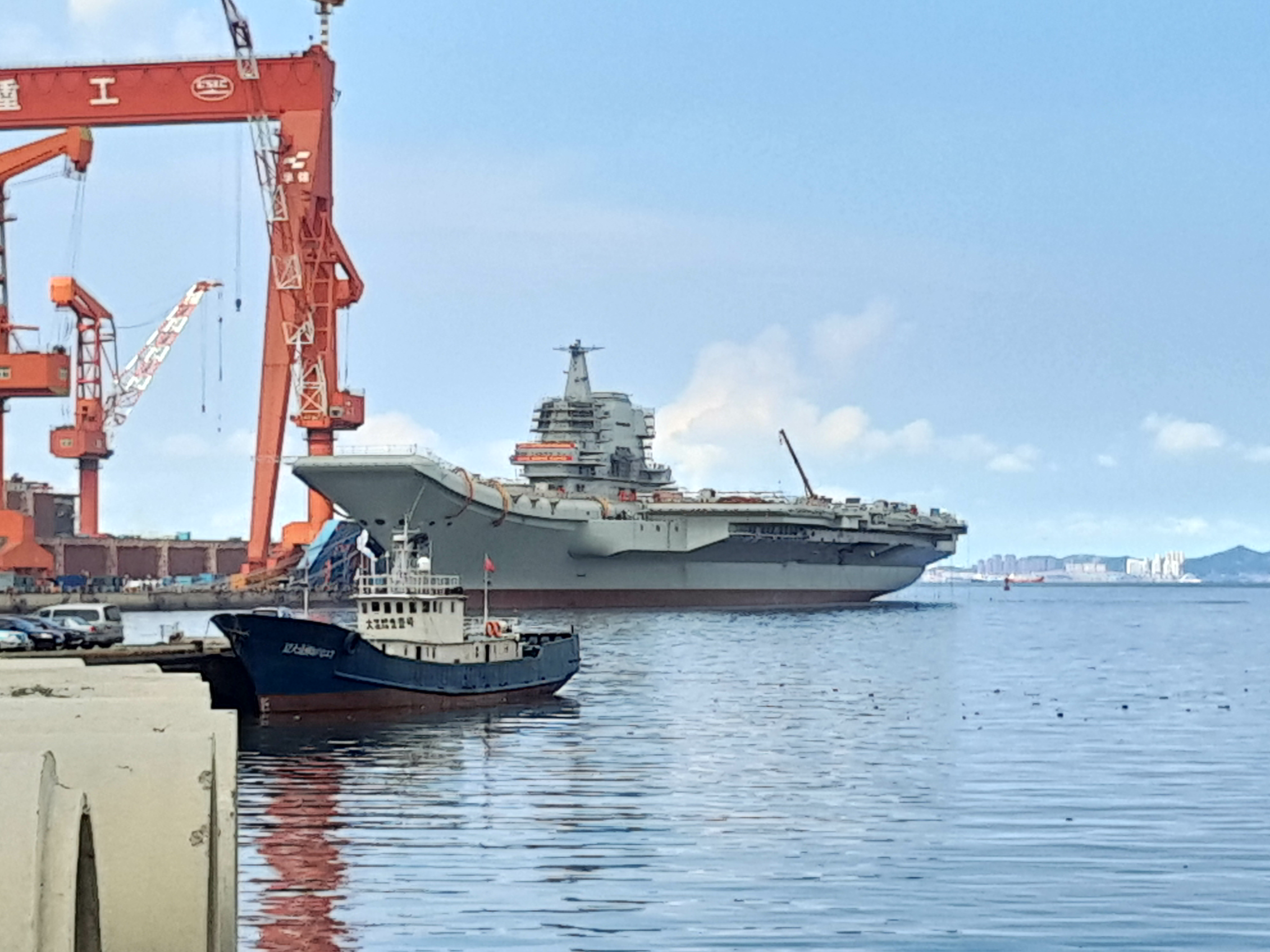
China's second aircraft carrier Shandong after launching in Dalian Shipbuilding Industry Company

Dalian Shipbuilding Industry Company (DSIC) is a state-owned shipbuilding enterprise located in Dalian, Liaoning province, China. It is part of the China Shipbuilding Industry Corporation (CSIC), which has since been merged into China State Shipbuilding Corporation to form China's largest shipbuilding company.

== General ==
Dalian Shipbuilding Industry Company (DSIC) was formed in December 2005, as the result of a merger between Dalian Shipbuilding Industry Company and Dalian New Shipbuilding Industry Company, and is the largest shipbuilding company in China. It is owned by:

- China Shipbuilding Industry Corporation

which is one of the two state-owned enterprises that came into being under the directive of the China State Council of 1999, the other being:

- China State Shipbuilding Corporation

While the former corporation is listed on the Shanghai Stock Exchange, the latter is not (yet) listed. Separately, the People's Liberation Army Navy owns military ship yards, such as in Lushun, Dalian, Liaoning.

DSIC located on two shipyards with a total of 3,400,000 square meters of land and owns 15,000 employees. Its revenue in 2006 exceeded CN¥10,000,000,000 which puts itself as the No. 1 shipbuilding company in China, exceeding Shanghai Waigaoqiao Shipbuilding Industry Company.

== History ==
Dalian Shipbuilding Industry Company has a history of more than 100 years.

- June 1898: Russia started construction of a ship yard next to Dalian Port, in their new leased territory
- 1905: Japan replaced Russia to lease Dalian and continued to expand the ship yard
- 1945: The Soviet Union liberates Manchuria and shared the operations of Dalian Shipyard with China.
- 1955: Became "China Shipbuilding Company", managed by China

During the 1960s, built China's first submarine equipped with guided missiles
During the 1970s, built China's first destroyer equipped with guided missiles

- July 1984: Spun off Dalian Maritime Diesel Company (DMDC) and other subsidiaries
- August 1990: Dalian New Shipyard was completed in the west of the old ship yard

During the 1990s, with help from Hitachi Shipbuilding Corporation (now part of Universal Shipbuilding Corporation) and others, introduced the "block construction" method, reducing the ship building time and cost

- August 2000: Dalian New Ship Yard was incorporated as Dalian New Shipbuilding Industry Co., Ltd.
- April 2002: Dalian New Ship Yard was incorporated as Dalian Shipbuilding Industry Co., Ltd.
- 2005: Under the directive of the China State Council, these two companies merged to become Dalian Shipbuilding Industry Co., Ltd.
- 2009: The former Soviet aircraft carrier Varyag was converted to the People's Liberation Army Navy's aircraft carrier Liaoning for training.
- 2014: Converted the Chinese aircraft carrier Liaoning from training aircraft carrier to active combat ready aircraft carrier
- 2013-2017: Built first indigenous Chinese aircraft carrier Shandong

== See also ==
- Shipbuilding and Shipyard
- List of shipbuilders and shipyards
- China Shipbuilding Industry Corporation (CSIC)
