= Hudong–Zhonghua Shipbuilding =

Chinese shipbuilding company

Coordinates: 31°16′39″N 121°34′10″E

Hudong–Zhonghua Shipbuilding (Group) Co., Ltd. 沪东中华造船(集团)有限公司

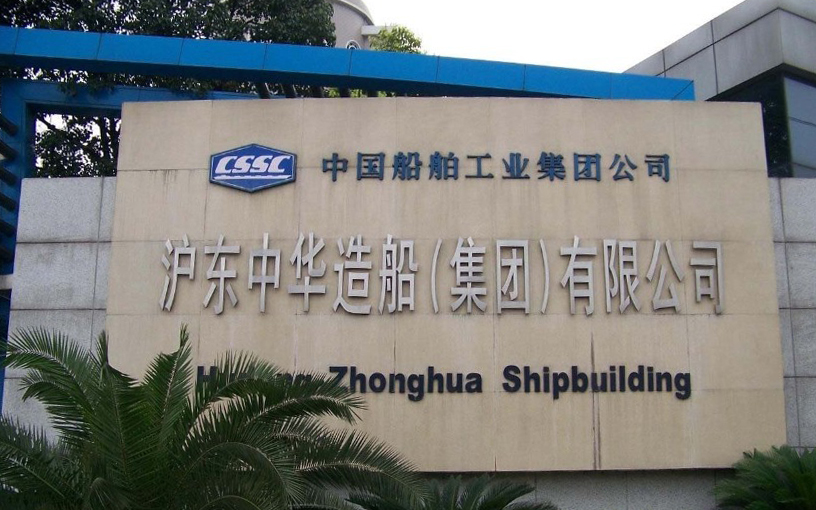
- Main gate of Hudong–Zhonghua Shipbuilding
- Type: State-owned enterprise
- Industry: Shipbuilding, defence
- Founded: 2001
- Headquarters: Shanghai, China
- Parent: China State Shipbuilding Corporation
- Website: hz-shipgroup.cssc.net.cn

Hudong–Zhonghua Shipbuilding is a subsidiary of China State Shipbuilding Corporation (CSSC). It produces civilian and military ships. Hudong–Zhonghua claims to be the "Cradle of Chinese Frigates and Landing Ships" for its work for the People's Liberation Army Navy.

== History ==
New location of Hudong–Zhonghua Shipyard - Changxingdao island

Hudong–Zhonghua Shipbuilding was formed by the merger of Hudong Shipbuilding Group and Zhonghua shipyard.

Hudong-Zhonghua constructed Dapeng Sun, the first LNG carrier built in China, for US$160 million. Delivery, four months late, occurred in April 2008.

In 2005, it was announced that Hudong-Zhonghua intended to invest 1 billion Kč into a joint venture with České loděnice (Czech Shipyard) in Děčín. České loděnice avoided collapse by merging with VEKA Group in 2011. In July 2001, a 5000-ton gantry crane collapsed at Hudong Shipbuilding Group while being erected, killing 36 workers and injuring another eight. It was the first gantry crane designed and built in China.

In May 2008, two 600-ton gantry cranes collapsed during a lifting operation, killing three and injuring another two.

In September 2017, Hudong-Zhonghua was contracted to build five of nine 23,000 TEU Jacques Saadé-class container ships. The ships were at the time the world's largest container vessels to run on LNG, measuring 400 meters long and 61 meters wide. The first, CMA CGM Jacques Saadé, was delivered on 22 September 2020; delivery had been expected in November 2019 but was delayed by 10 months. By 2021, all of the five ships contracted to Hudong-Zhonghua had been delivered.

In 2019, Hudong-Zhonghua won a contract for four 23,000 TEU ships from the Taiwanese Evergreen shipping line, after the successful delivery of four 2,500 teu ships to the same company previously. A spokesperson for Hudong-Zhonghua's parent China State Shipbuilding Corporation said "this showed major liner operators had endorsed the shipbuilder's design and construction of ultra-large containerships".

In 2020, Hudong-Zhonghua won a US$3 billion contract for 16 LNG carriers to be delivered to QatarEnergy. The tender was part of a plan by QatarEnergy, the world's largest LNG producer to support its expected increase in LNG production, and will potentially include up to 100 new LNG carriers.

In January 2021, it was reported that the Hudong-Zhonghua yard would relocate to Changxing Island, next to the Jiangnan Shipyard. Construction of the yard commenced in January 2021. The first of two phases is expected to be completed in 2023 for CN¥8 billion. The total cost is expected to be CN¥18 billion.

In June 2021, Evergreen awarded a contract to Hudong–Zhonghua Shipbuilding for a pair of 24,000 TEU Evergreen A-class ships, which will become the world's largest container ships by TEU, with delivery expected in late 2023 to early 2024. The ships were estimated to cost $180m each. In March 2022, another 3 ships of the class were ordered.

== Incidents with LNG ships ==
Early Chinese-built LNG carriers suffered reliability issues. Dapeng Sun underwent lengthy repairs in Singapore 14 months after being delivered. CESI Gladstone, a LNG carrier delivered by Hudong-Zhonghua in October 2016, suffered a propulsion breakdown near Papua New Guinea in June 2018.

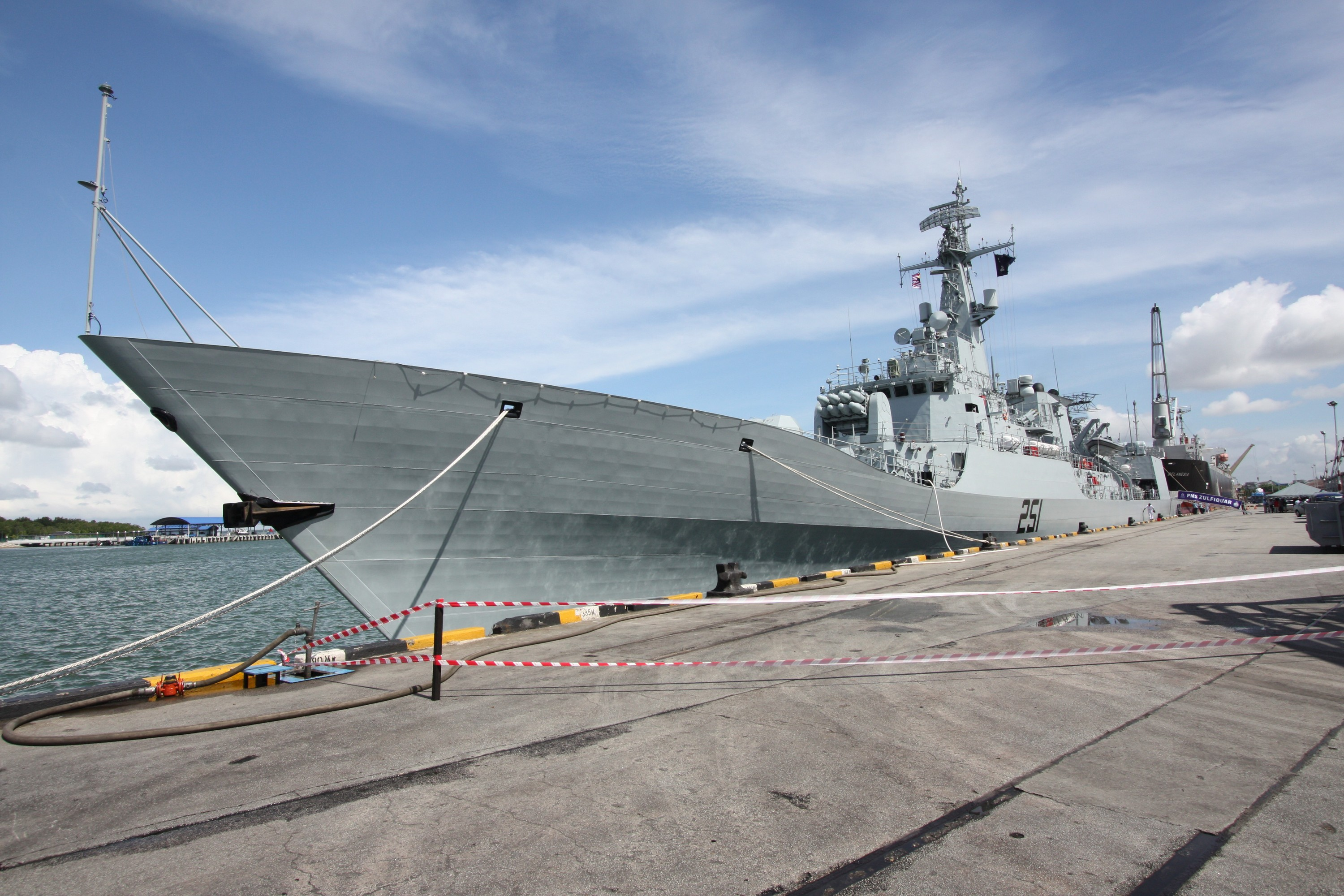
The F-22P frigate built by Hudong-Zhonghua for the Pakistan Navy

== Facilities and divisions ==
Hudong Heavy Machinery

Created from the merger of the engine divisions of the Hudong and Shanghai Shipyards

Hudong Shipyard
Shanghai Edward Shipbuilding

Created in 1997 as a joint venture between CSSC and Hansa Shipbuilding. Reportedly a joint venture between Hudong–Zhonghua and Hansa in 2005.

Huarun Dadong Shipyard

Joint venture with China Resources

Zhonghua Shipyard

== See also ==
- List of shipbuilders and shipyards
- G4-class freighter, built by Hudong–Zhonghua
