= Kotlin-class destroyer =

Soviet destroyers built 1955–1958

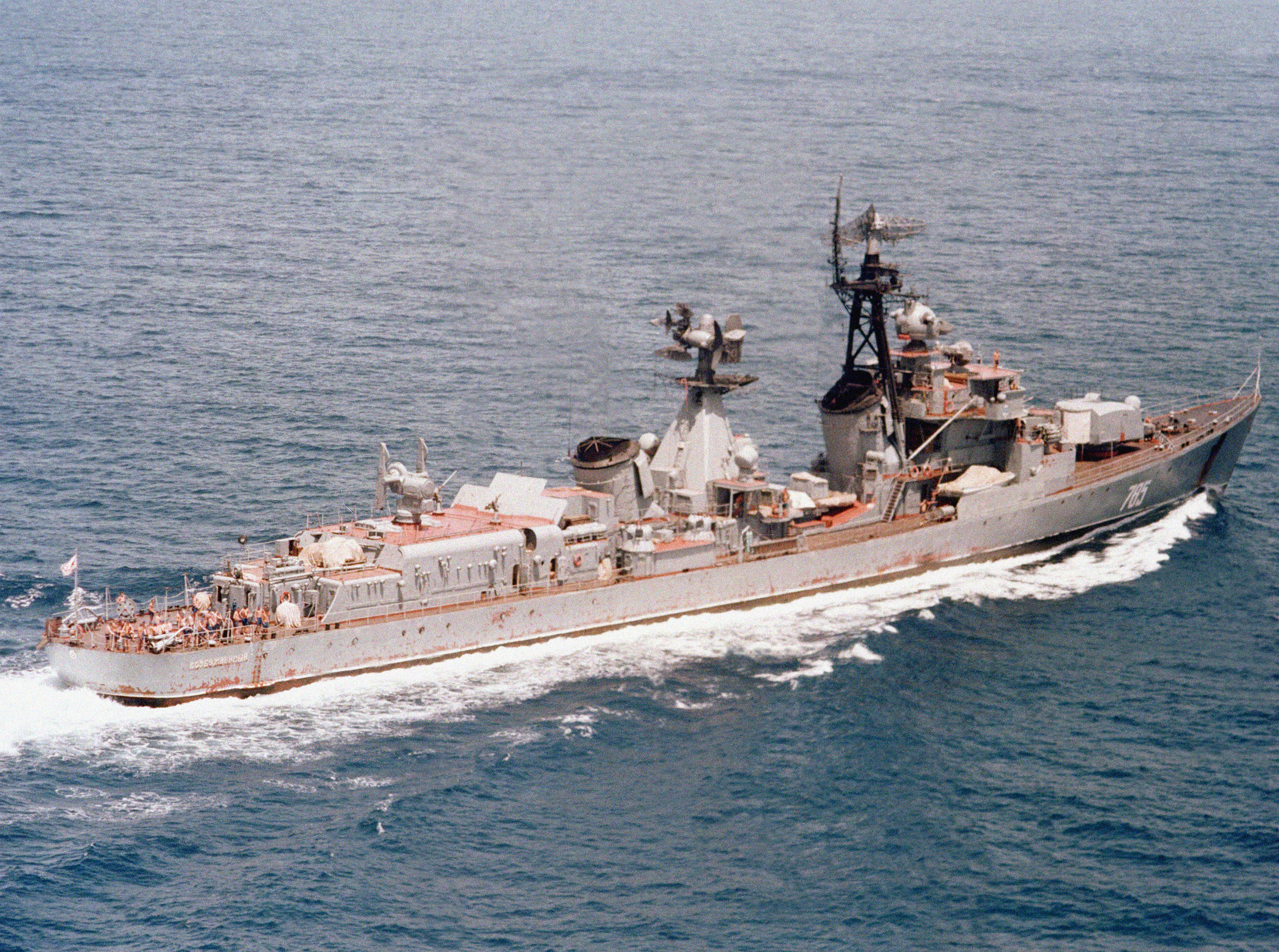
- Kotlin-class destroyer Vozbuzhdeny in January 1981

Class overview
- Name: Project 56
- Builders: Shipyard No.445 (61 Kommunar) (8); Shipyard No.190 (Zhdanov) (12); Shipyard No.199, Komsomolsk-on-Amur (7)
- Operators: Soviet Navy; Polish Navy
- Preceded by: Neustrashimy class
- Succeeded by: Kildin class
- Built: 1953-1958
- In commission: 1955-1992
- Completed: 27
- Active: 0
- Retired: 27

General characteristics
- Type: destroyer
- Displacement: 2,662 tonnes (2,620 long tons; 2,934 short tons) (standard), 3,230 t (3,180 long tons; 3,560 short tons) (full load)
- Length: 126.1 m (414 ft)
- Beam: 12.7 m (42 ft)
- Draught: 4.2 m (14 ft)
- Propulsion: 2 × shaft geared steam turbines, 4 boilers, 72,000 hp (54 MW)
- Speed: 38 knots (70 km/h; 44 mph)
- Complement: 284
- Sensors & processing systems: Radar: Fut -N (air search), Ryf (surface); Sonar: Pegas
- Armament: (Project 56); 4 × 130 mm (5.1 in) SM-2-1 guns (2×2); 16 × 45 mm (1.8 in) SM-20-ZIF guns (4×4); 10 × 533 mm (20 in) PTA-53-56 torpedo tubes (2×5); 6 × BMB-2 depth charge throwers (later replaced by ASW mortars); 50 × mines; (Project 56A); 2 × 130 mm (5.1 in) SM-2-1 gun (1×2); 4 × 45 mm (1.8 in) SM-20-ZIF gun (1×4); 8 × 30 mm (1.2 in) AK-230 guns (4×2); 5 × 533 mm (20 in) TA MPTA-53M torpedo tubes (1×5); 24 × 213 mm (10 in) RBU-6000 ASW rocket launchers (2×12); 1× twin S-125 Neva/Pechora (NATO SA-N-1) SAM (16 missiles); 50 × mines

The Kotlin class is a NATO reporting name for Project 56 Spokoiny (Спокойный, "tranquil"), a class of Cold War era destroyers built for the Soviet Navy. 27 ships were built between 1955 and 1958; they were all decommissioned in the late 1980s. The Kildin class is based on the design of the Kotlins. The Chinese Luda class which is based on the Soviet Neustrashimy class, also borrows some design concepts from the Kotlin class.

== Design ==
This design was a smaller version of the Neustrashimy-class destroyer which was seen as being too large and expensive for economic series production, as well as too slow. Detailed design changes eliminated some of the problems seen during trials of Neustrashimy. A production run of 100 ships was planned but this was curtailed because of the advent of the guided missile. 32 were ordered, but four ships were completed as the Kildin class (Project 56E/EM). The last vessel was canceled.

11 ships (Project 56PLO, "Kotlin Mod.") were modified for enhanced ASW capabilities by adding rocket depth charge launchers.

In 1962, the Soviet Navy installed the navalized version of the S-125 Neva, the SA-N-1 'Goa', to a surface-to-air missile Kotlin-class destroyer, Bravy (also spelled Bravyy/Bravyi) for testing. The system used the 4K90 (V-600) missile that could engage targets at distances from 4–15 km (0–10 mi) and altitudes of 100–10,000 m (300–32,800 ft). Fire control and guidance was provided by 4R90 Yatagan radar. The system could track only one target at a time. The missiles were loaded on the dual-arm ZIF-101 launcher, with under-deck magazine storage for 16 more.

The Soviet Navy would eventually retrofit seven Kotlin-class ships to carry SAMs; these ships were known to NATO as the Kotlin SAM class (Project 56A). One more was modified and sold to Poland (Project 56AE, being the only Project 56 destroyer exported). Later versions of the SAM system, such as the Volna-M (SA-N-1B), the Volna-P, and Volna-N provided greater missile range and capability.

== Ships ==
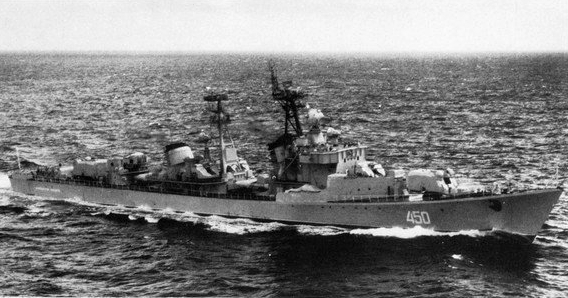
Soviet destroyer Vyderzhanny c.1973, in Project 56 configuration

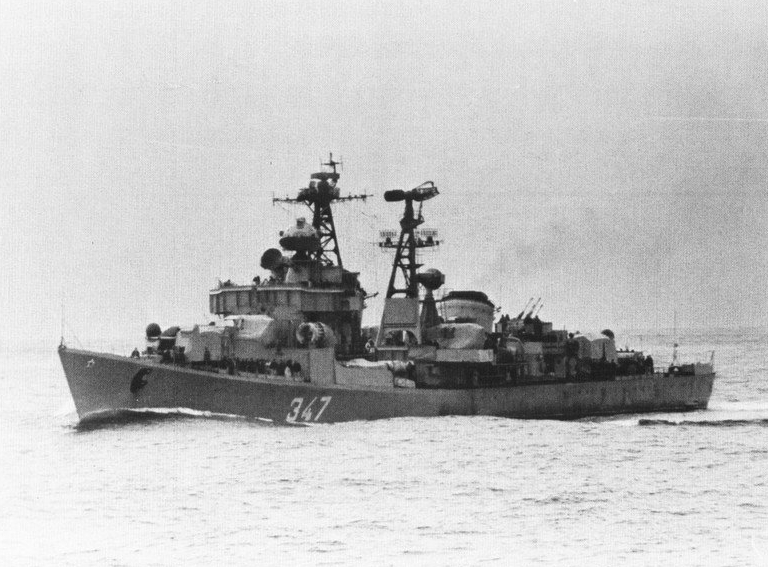
Unidentified Soviet Kotlin-class destroyer c.1973, in Project 56PLO configuration

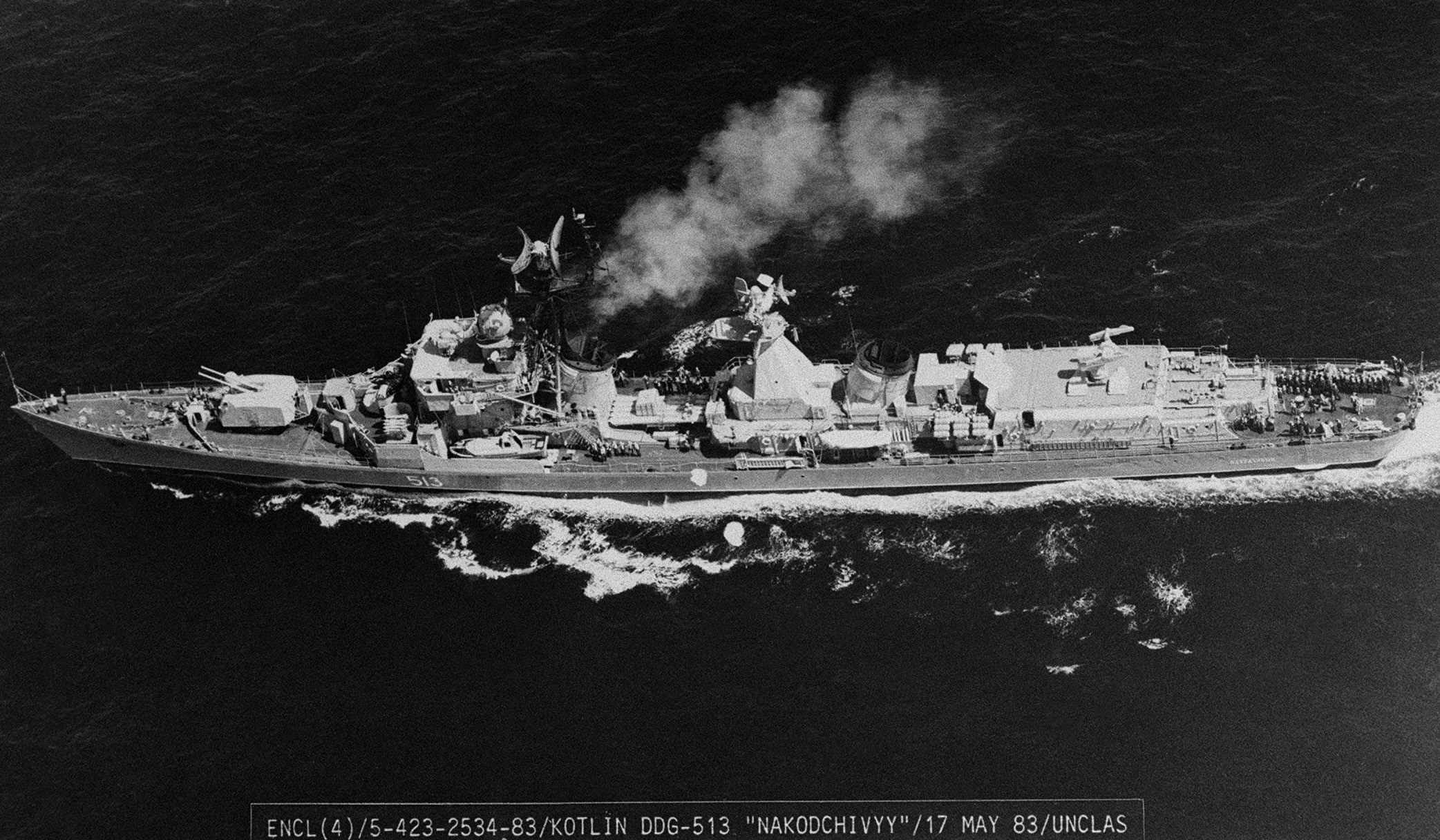
Soviet destroyer Nakhodchivy in 1983, in Project 56A configuration

| Ship | Russian | Builder | Launched | Commissioned | Modernisation | Decommissioned |
|---|---|---|---|---|---|---|
| Spokoiny | Спокойный - "Peaceful" | Zhdanov, Leningrad | 28 November 1953 | 27 June 1956 | none | 19 April 1990 |
| Svetly | Светлый - "Bright" (or "Light") | Zhdanov, Leningrad | 27 October 1953 | 17 September 1955 | none | 25 April 1989 |
| Speshny | Спешный - "Rapid" | Zhdanov, Leningrad | 7 August 1954 | 30 September 1955 | none | 25 April 1989 |
| Skromny | Скромный - "Modest" | Zhdanov, Leningrad | 26 October 1954 | 30 December 1955 | SAM (56A) | 25 April 1989 |
| Svedushchy | Сведущий - "Knowledgeable" | Zhdanov, Leningrad | 17 February 1955 | 31 January 1956 | SAM (56A) | 8 April 1992 |
| Smyshleny | Смышленый - "Sharp (quickwitted)" | Zhdanov, Leningrad | 24 May 1955 | 28 June 1956 | ASW (56PLO) | 22 June 1986 |
| Skrytny | Скрытный - "Secretive" | Zhdanov, Leningrad | 27 September 1955 | 30 September 1956 | none | 25 April 1989 |
| Soznatelny | Сознательный - "Aware" | Zhdanov, Leningrad | 15 January 1956 | 31 October 1956 | SAM (56A) | 1 March 1988 |
| Spravedlivy | Справедливый - "Just" | Zhdanov, Leningrad | 12 April 1956 | 20 December 1956 | SAM (56AE) | Transferred to the Polish navy as ORP Warszawa in 1970 |
| Nesokrushimy | Несокрушимый - "Indestructible" | Zhdanov, Leningrad | 20 July 1956 | 30 June 1957 | SAM (56A) | 27 July 1991 |
| Nakhodchivy | Находчивый - "Resourceful" | Zhdanov, Leningrad | 30 October 1956 | 18 December 1957 | SAM (56A) | 25 April 1989 |
| Nastoychivy | Настойчивый - "Persistent" | Zhdanov, Leningrad | 23 April 1957 | 30 November 1958 | SAM (56A) | 25 April 1989 |
| Byvalvy | Бывалый - "Experienced" | Nikolayev | 31 March 1954 | 21 December 1955 | ASW (56PLO) | 17 July 1988 |
| Bravy | Бравый - "Brave" | Nikolayev | 25 July 1953 | 9 January 1956 | SAM (56K) | 30 July 1987 |
| Bessledny | Бесследный - "Untraceable" | Nikolayev | 1 April 1954 | 31 October 1956 | ASW (56PLO) | 8 April 1988 |
| Burlivy | Бурливый - "Turbulent" or "Tempestuous" | Nikolayev | 5 May 1954 | 28 December 1956 | ASW (56PLO) | 25 May 1989 |
| Blagorodny | Благородный - "Noble" | Nikolayev | 5 March 1955 | 18 July 1957 | ASW (56PLO) | 25 April 1989 |
| Blestyashchy | Блестящий - "Brilliant" | Nikolayev | 20 February 1953 | 30 September 1955 | ASW (56PLO) | 30 July 1987 |
| Plamenny | Пламенный - "Fiery" or "Ardent" | Nikolayev | 3 September 1955 | 31 August 1957 | ASW (56PLO) | 24 June 1991 |
| Naporisty | Напористый - "Forceful" | Nikolayev | 17 August 1955 | 31 October 1957 | ASW (56PLO) | 30 July 1987 |
| Vyzyvayushchy | Вызывающий - "Challenging" | Komsomolsk-na-Amure | 25 July 1953 | 31 March 1956 | ASW (56PLO) | 25 April 1989 |
| Vesky | Веский - "Convincing" | Komsomolsk-na-Amure | 30 January 1954 | 30 March 1956 | none | 30 July 1987 |
| Vdokhnovenny | Вдохновенный - "Inspiring" | Komsomolsk-na-Amure | 31 August 1954 | 30 October 1956 | ASW (56PLO) | 5 March 1987 |
| Vozmuscheny | Возмущенный - "Indignant" | Komsomolsk-na-Amure | 30 December 1954 | 31 December 1956 | ASW (56PLO) | 5 March 1987 |
| Vozbuzhdeny | Возбужденный - "Excited" | Komsomolsk-na-Amure | 29 July 1955 | 31 October 1957 | SAM (56A) | 25 April 1989 |
| Vliyatelny | Влиятельный - "Influential" | Komsomolsk-na-Amure | 29 October 1955 | 6 November 1957 | none | 17 July 1988 |
| Vyderzhanny | Выдержанный - "Consistent" | Komsomolsk-na-Amure | 24 June 1957 | 10 December 1957 | none | 24 April 1992 |

- Bravy - was the Kotlin SAM prototype

The ships were scrapped between 1987 and 1990.

== See also ==
- List of ships of the Soviet Navy
- List of ships of Russia by project number

Equivalent destroyers of the same era

- T 47 class
- Daring class
- Akizuki class
- Friesland class
- Halland class
- Impetuoso class
- Forrest Sherman class
- Hamburg class

== Bibliography ==
- Friedman, Norman (1995). "Soviet Union 1947–1991: Russian Federation and Successor States 1991–". In Chumbley, Stephen (ed.). Conway's All the World's Fighting Ships, 1947–1995. Naval Institute Press. pp. 337–426. ISBN 1-55750-132-7.
- Pavlov, A. S. (1997). Warships of the USSR and Russia 1945–1995. Naval Institute Press. ISBN 1-55750-671-X.
- Radziemski, Jan (2026). Soviet Cold War Destroyers. Osprey Publishing. ISBN 978-1-4728-7489-4.
- Warship International Staff (2015). "Views from the Career of the Soviet Destroyer Bravyy". Warship International. LII (1): 28–35. ISSN 0043-0374.
