= 33DD destroyer =

Proposed Japanese destroyer

Class overview
- Name: 33DD Destroyer
- Builders: Kawasaki Heavy Industries
- Operators: Japan Maritime Self-Defense Force

General characteristics
- Type: Guided missile destroyer
- Sensors & processing systems: FCS-3

The 33DD (also known as DDR or Destroyer Revolution) was a Japanese destroyer proposed for the Japan Maritime Self-Defense Force. The tentative name of the class, 33 DD, is derived from an estimate that it would be budgeted in the Japanese era of Heisei 33 (2021). However, the fiscal 2021 budget, which was released in 2020, does not include 33 DD, and the plan for the destroyer is not concrete.

== Development ==
The first concept model of the destroyer was shown in Defense Technology Symposium 2010 by Kawasaki Heavy Industries. The project was also mentioned in the FY2011 defense budget request, only mentioning that research on new integrated antenna system and sonar system for next generation destroyers is to be carried out around 2018. Later a second model was shown in Defense Technology Symposium 2012.

== Design ==
The destroyer will feature an integrated mast, a Carbon fiber reinforced plastic (CFRP) hull and will have a slightly higher displacement than the Asahi-class destroyer. The CFRP hull reduces the ship's electromagnetic signature and its structural elasticity provides protection against torpedoes and mines. The hull will also be made of high strength stainless steel due to its superior protection from air and underwater explosion compared to high tensile steel. The first model unveiled is described to displace 5400 tons and is very similar in design to the Asahi-class destroyers. The second concept model displaces 5100 tons and features a stealthier design than first. The FCS-3 system and integrated radio wave systems is used to enhance the ship's communication, radar, and electronic warfare capabilities.
