= Japanese torpedo boat Kotaka =

Ship built in 1885

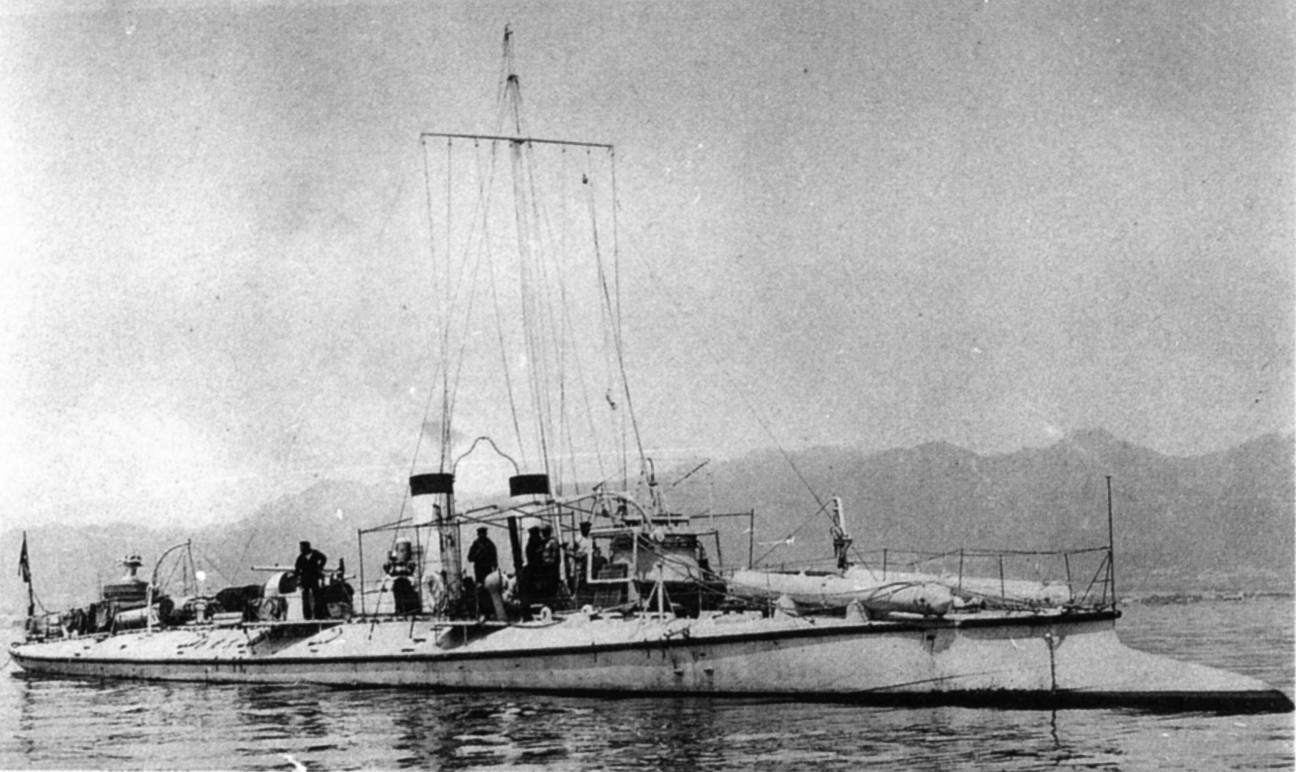
- Kotaka (1887)

History

Empire of Japan
- Name: Kotaka
- Ordered: 1885
- Builder: Yarrow & Company, United Kingdom
- Laid down: 1887
- Launched: 21 January 1887
- Completed: 10 October 1888
- Commissioned: 19 August 1890
- Decommissioned: 1 April 1908
- Fate: Scrapped 27 January 1927

General characteristics
- Type: Torpedo boat
- Displacement: 203 long tons (206 t)
- Length: 50.3 m (165 ft)
- Beam: 5.8 m (19 ft)
- Draught: 1.7 m (5 ft 7 in)
- Propulsion: Coal-fired engine (mixed coal/oil from 1904), 1,400 hp (1,044 kW)
- Speed: 19 knots (22 mph; 35 km/h)
- Armament: 4 × 37 mm (1.5 in) guns; 6 × 360 mm (14 in) torpedo tubes

Kotaka (小鷹, ”Little Falcon”) was a torpedo boat of the Imperial Japanese Navy. She was ordered in 1885 from the shipbuilder Yarrows in London, Great Britain, where she was built in parts along Japanese specifications, and then assembled in Yokosuka Naval Arsenal, Japan.

She participated in the First Sino-Japanese War (1894–1895) and the Russo-Japanese War (1904–1905). She was decommissioned on 1 April 1908, to become a training ship. She was retired on 1 March 1916, but again reactivated in 1917, ending her career in January 1927.

== Design and construction ==
An order for what became Kotaka was initially planned in 1881, but was delayed by funding issues which also affected completion of Japan's first torpedo boats (the 40 ton TB-1-class), and a final order was not placed with the British shipbuilders Yarrows until 29 April 1885.

When launched in 1887, Kotaka, at 203 tons, was the largest torpedo boat in the world, and "was the forerunner of torpedo-boat destroyers that appeared a decade later". She was armed with four 1-pounder (37 mm) quick-firing guns and six torpedo tubes. In the following years, the Imperial Japanese Navy equipped itself with much smaller torpedo boats of French design, but in her trials in 1899, Kotaka demonstrated that she could go beyond a role of coastal defense, and was capable of following larger ships on the high seas. The British shipbuilder Yarrow "considered Japan to have effectively invented the destroyer".

According to The Engineer dated 2 July 1886, an item reported that the British shipyard of Messrs. Yarrow & Co. at Poplar built for account of the Japanese government a torpedo boat of which the design was not the usual type. She was larger as the torpedo boats until then built while her vulnerable parts including the machinery were protected against machine-gun fire by 1" armour made of steel. Main dimensions were 166 x 19 feet, with a displacement of 203 tons. The 1,400-hp engines delivered via twin screws gave her a speed of 19-20 knots possible.

The torpedo boat was disassembled and shipped to Japan, where she was to be assembled again. She was armed with two torpedo tubes placed in fixed bow launching tubes for (gunpowder-ejected) torpedoes. Amidships and aft were on the exposed deck were turntables placed for mounting each a pair of torpedo guns. It was almost possible to fire parallel with this guns. Yarrow had already built 8 years earlier torpedo boats for Japan which were designed by Sir Edward John Reed.

In 1904, Kotaka was experimentally refitted with a mixed oil and coal engine, instead of her original coal-only propulsion.
