= Destroyer =

Type of warship intended to escort other larger ships

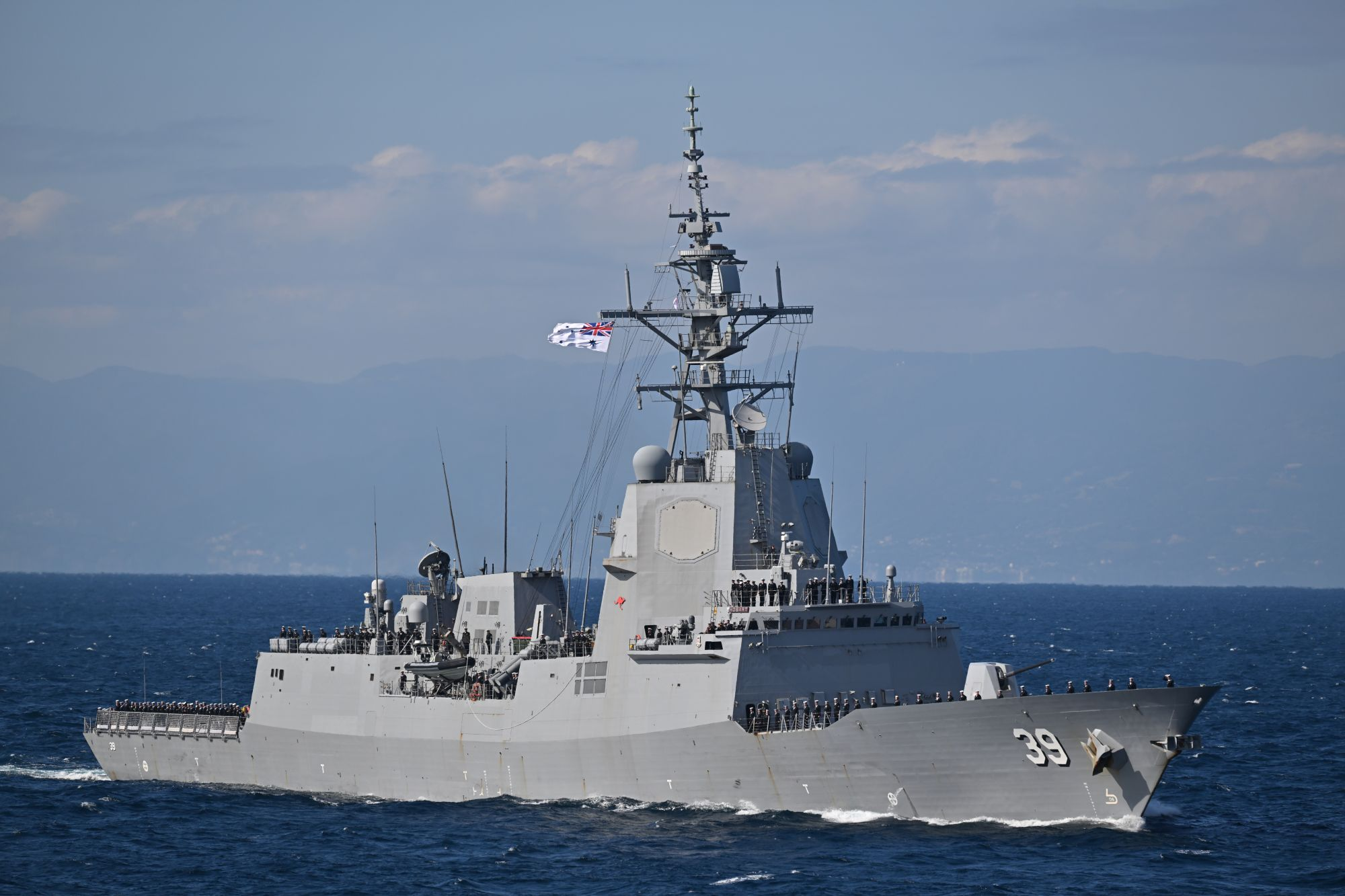
- HMAS Hobart, the lead ship of the RAN's Hobart class of destroyers
- Classification: Watercraft
- Industry: Arms
- Application: Naval warfare
- Inventor: Fernando Villaamil
- Invented: 1887 (139 years ago)

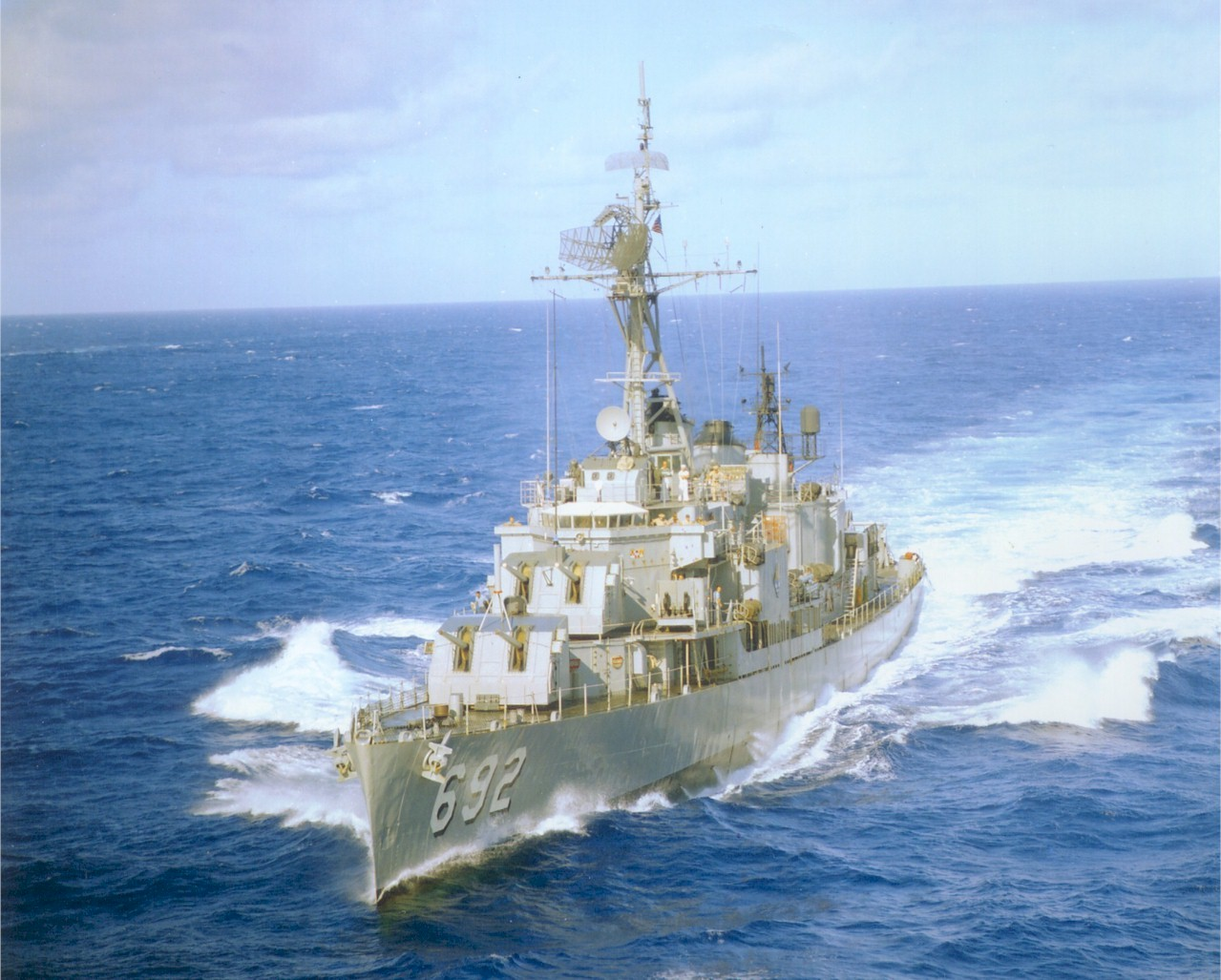
USS Allen M. Sumner, the lead ship of the US Navy's Allen M. Sumner class of destroyers, sailing off the coast of Hawaii

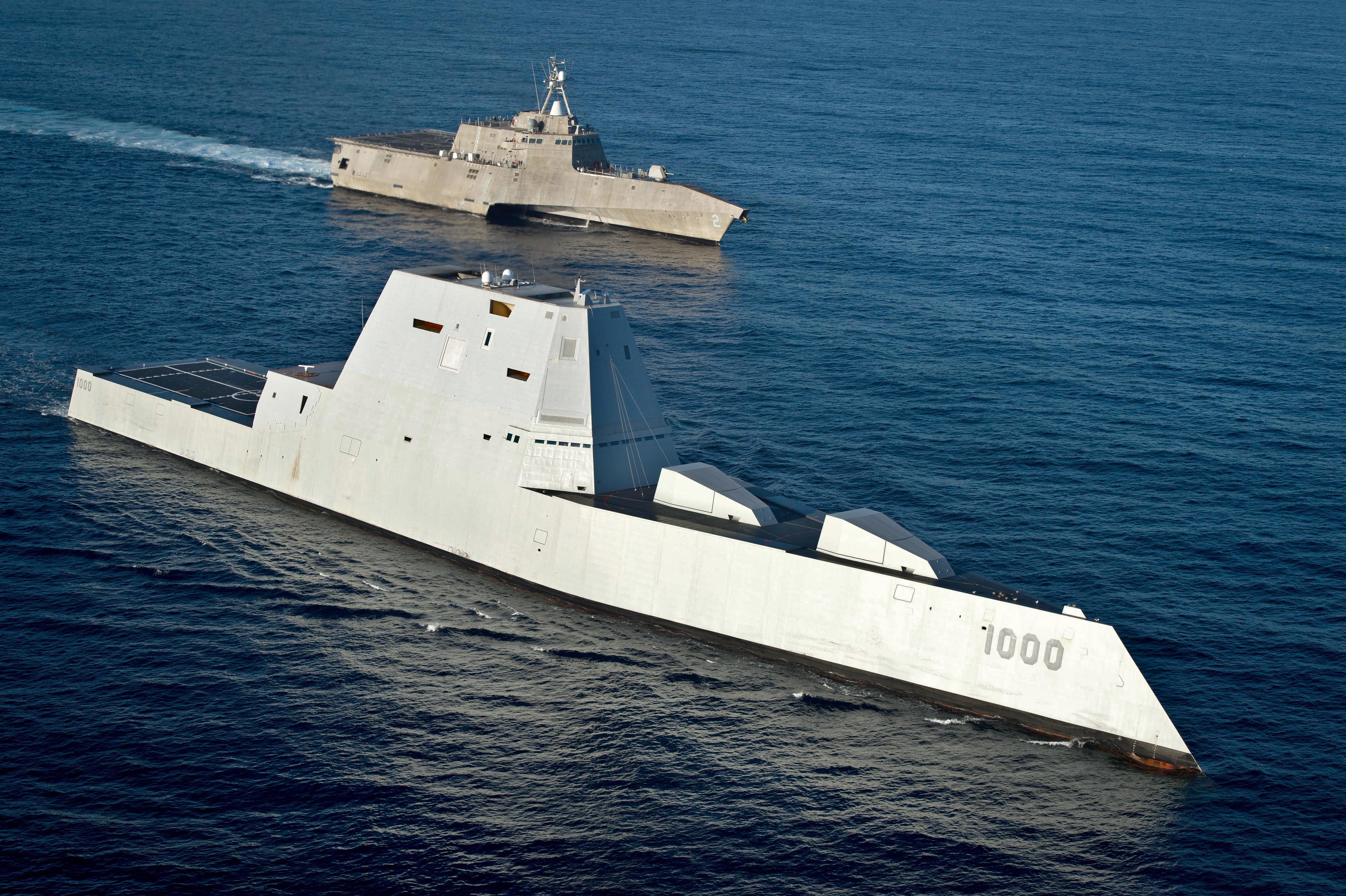
USS Zumwalt, the lead ship of the US Navy's Zumwalt class, sailing in formation with USS Independence (rear)

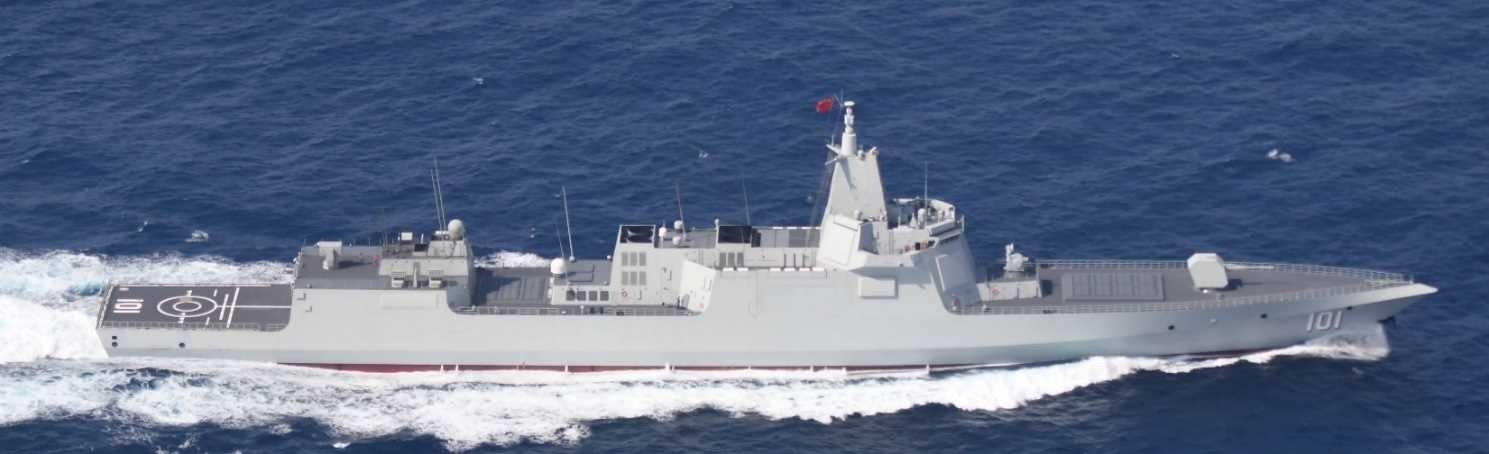
Type 055 class destroyer Nanchang of the Chinese People's Liberation Army Navy (PLAN)

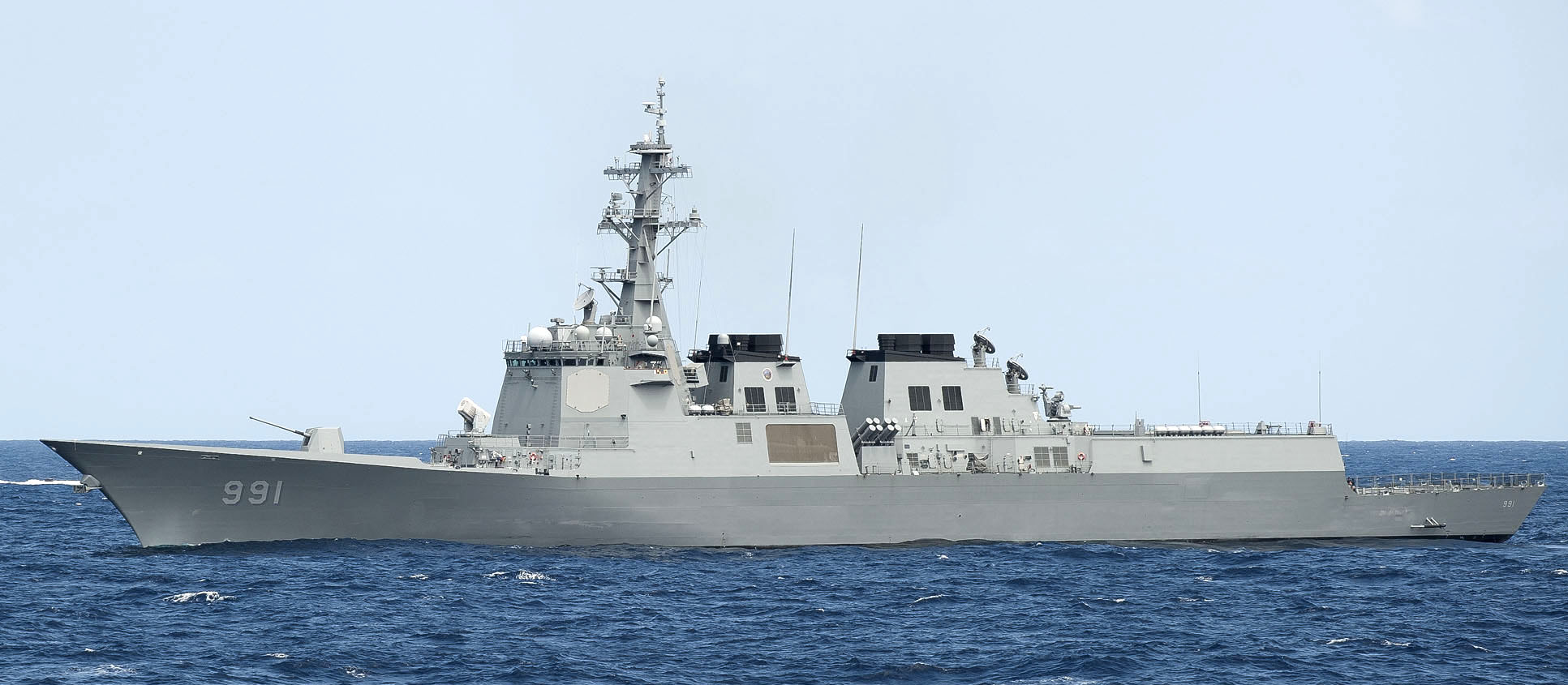
ROKS Sejong the Great, the lead ship of her class of destroyers of the Republic of Korea Navy

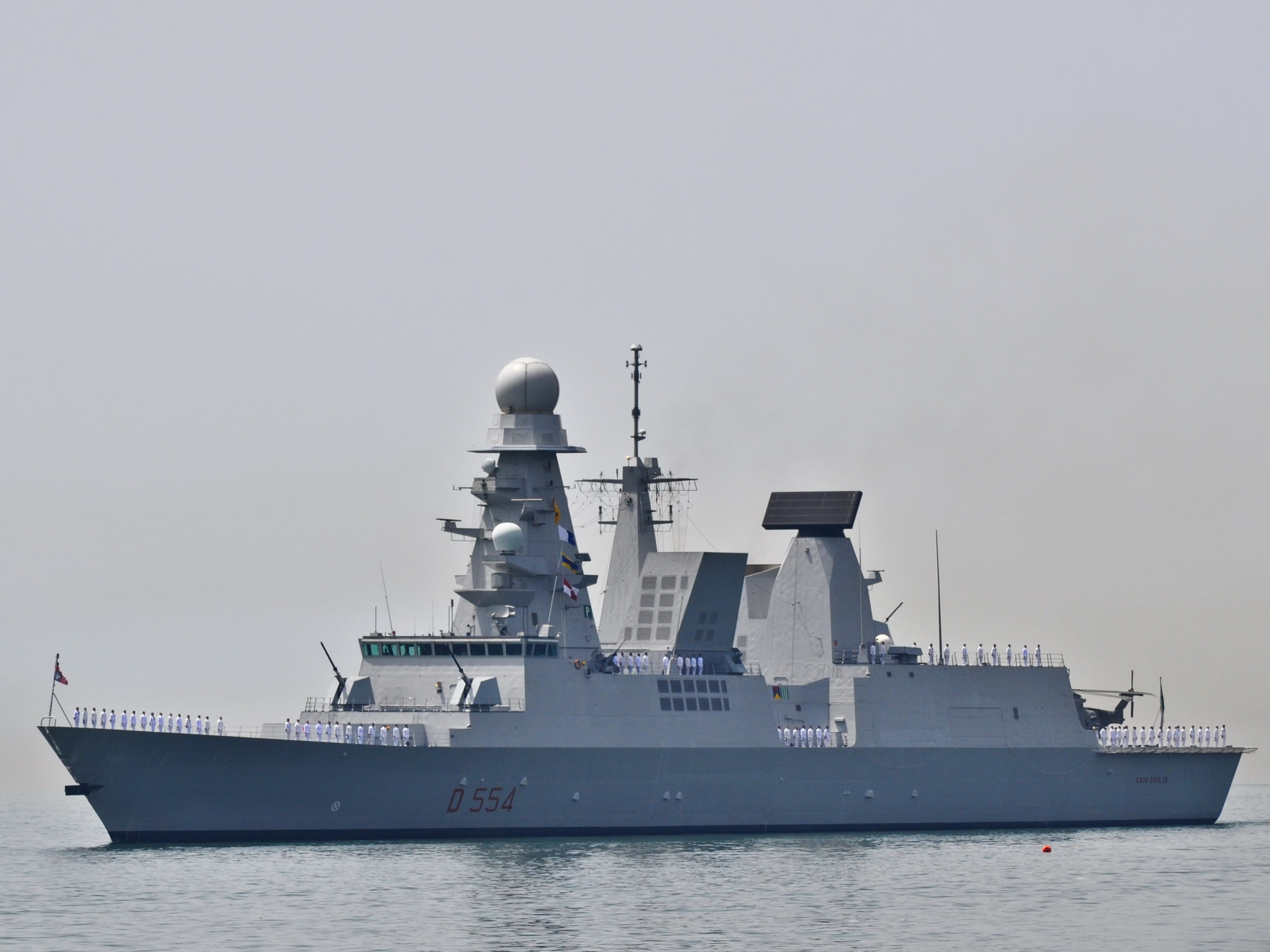
The Italian Caio Duilio, which belongs to the Horizon class of Franco-Italian designed first-rate frigates

In naval terminology, a destroyer is a fast, manoeuvrable, long-endurance warship intended to escort larger vessels in a fleet, convoy, or carrier battle group and defend them against a wide range of general threats. They were conceived in the late 19th century as a defence against torpedo boats, and by the time of the Russo-Japanese War in 1904, these "torpedo boat destroyers" (TBDs) were "large, swift, and powerfully armed torpedo boats designed to destroy other torpedo boats". Although the term "destroyer" had been used interchangeably with "TBD" and "torpedo boat destroyer" by navies since 1892, the term "torpedo boat destroyer" was generally shortened to simply "destroyer" by nearly all navies by the First World War.

Before World War II, destroyers were light vessels with little endurance for unattended ocean operations; typically, a number of destroyers and a single destroyer tender operated together. After the war, destroyers grew in size. The American Allen M. Sumner-class destroyers (from 1943) had a displacement of 2,200 tons, while the Arleigh Burke class (from 1991) has a displacement of up to 9,600 tons, a difference of nearly 340%. Moreover, the advent of guided missiles allowed destroyers to take on the surface-combatant roles previously filled by battleships and cruisers. This resulted in larger and more powerful guided-missile destroyers more capable of independent operation.

Since the end of the 20th century, destroyers have been the global standard for surface-combatant ships, with only two nations (the United States and Russia) officially operating the heavier cruisers, with no battleships or true battlecruisers remaining. (Note: Although the Russian Kirov class are sometimes classified as battlecruisers due to their displacement, they are described by Russia as large missile cruisers.) Modern guided-missile destroyers are equivalent in tonnage but vastly superior in firepower to cruisers of the World War II era, and are capable of carrying nuclear-tipped cruise missiles. At 510 feet (160 m) long, a displacement of 9,200 tons, and with an armament of more than 90 missiles, guided-missile destroyers such as the Arleigh Burke class are actually larger and more heavily armed than most previous ships classified as guided-missile cruisers. The Chinese Type 055 destroyer has been described as a cruiser in some US Navy reports due to its size and armament.

Many NATO navies, such as the French, Spanish, Dutch, Danish, and German, use the term "frigate" for their destroyers, which leads to some confusion.

== Origins ==
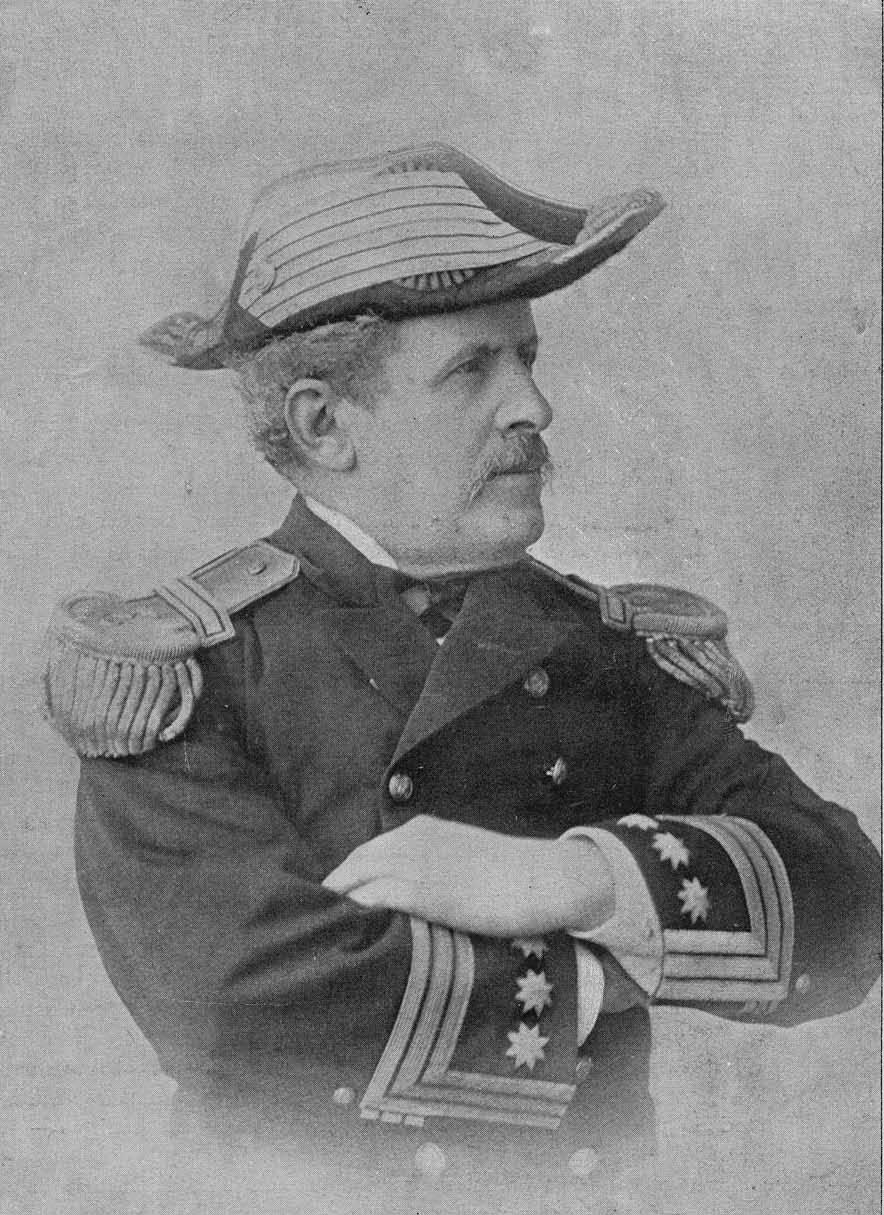
Fernando Villaamil, credited as the inventor of the destroyer concept with his specifications for the Destructor.

The emergence and development of the destroyer was related to the invention of the self-propelled torpedo in the 1860s. A navy now had the potential to destroy a superior enemy battle fleet using steam launches to fire torpedoes. Cheap, fast boats armed with torpedoes, called torpedo boats, were built and became a threat to large capital ships near enemy coasts. The first seagoing vessel designed to launch the self-propelled Whitehead torpedo was the 33-ton HMS Lightning in 1876. She was armed with two drop collars to launch these weapons; these were replaced in 1879 by a single torpedo tube in the bow. By the 1880s, the type had evolved into small ships of 50–100 tons, fast enough to evade enemy picket boats.

At first, the threat of a torpedo-boat attack to a battle fleet was considered to exist only when at anchor, but as faster and longer-range torpedo boats and torpedoes were developed, the threat extended to cruising at sea. In response to this new threat, more heavily gunned picket boats called "catchers" were built, which were used to escort the battle fleet at sea. They needed significant seaworthiness and endurance to operate with the battle fleet, and as they inherently became larger, they became officially designated "torpedo-boat destroyers", and by the First World War were largely known as "destroyers" in English. The antitorpedo boat origin of this type of ship is retained in its name in other languages, including French (contre-torpilleur), Italian (cacciatorpediniere), Portuguese (contratorpedeiro), Greek (antitorpiliko, αντιτορπιλικό), Dutch (torpedobootjager) and, up until the Second World War, Polish (kontrtorpedowiec, now obsolete).

Once destroyers became more than just catchers guarding an anchorage, they were recognized to be also ideal to take over the offensive role of torpedo boats themselves, so they were also fitted with torpedo tubes in addition to their antitorpedo-boat guns. At that time, and even into World War I, the only function of destroyers was to protect their own battle fleet from enemy torpedo attacks and to make such attacks on the battleships of the enemy. The task of escorting merchant convoys was still in the future.

=== Early designs ===
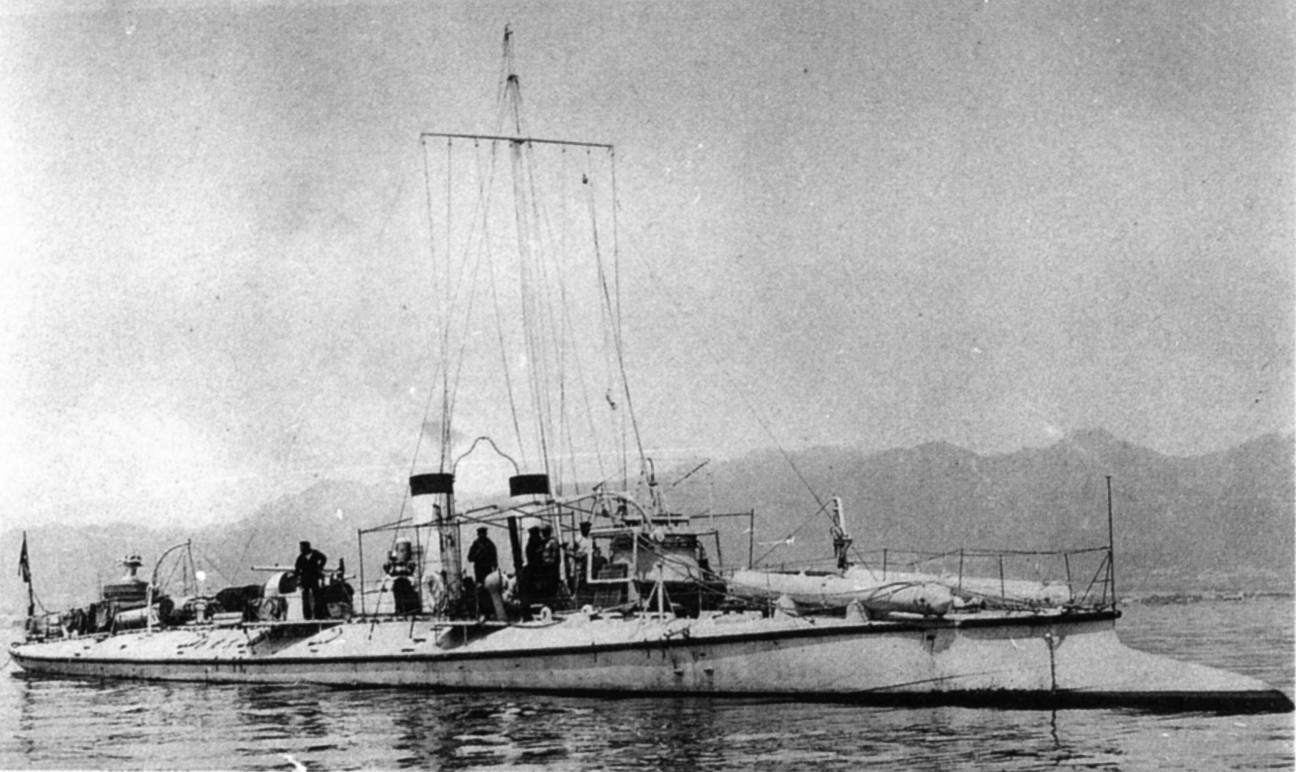
The Imperial Japanese Navy's Kotaka (1887)

An important development came with the construction of HMS Swift in 1884, later redesignated TB 81. This was a large (137 ton) torpedo boat with four 47 mm quick-firing guns and three torpedo tubes. At 23.75 knots (43.99 km/h; 27.33 mph), while still not fast enough to engage enemy torpedo boats reliably, the ship at least had the armament to deal with them.

Another forerunner of the torpedo-boat destroyer (TBD) was the Japanese torpedo boat Kotaka (Falcon), built in 1885. Designed to Japanese specifications and ordered from the Isle of Dogs, London Yarrow shipyard in 1885, she was transported in parts to Japan, where she was assembled and launched in 1887. The 165-foot (50 m) long vessel was armed with four 1-pounder (37 mm) quick-firing guns and six torpedo tubes, reached 19 knots (35 km/h), and at 203 tons, was the largest torpedo boat built to date. In her trials in 1889, Kotaka demonstrated that she could exceed the role of coastal defence, and was capable of accompanying larger warships on the high seas. The Yarrow shipyards, builder of the parts for Kotaka, "considered Japan to have effectively invented the destroyer".

The German aviso Greif, launched in 1886, was designed as a "Torpedojäger" (torpedo hunter), intended to screen the fleet against attacks by torpedo boats. The ship was significantly larger than torpedo boats of the period, displacing some 2,266 t (2,230 long tons), with an armament of 10.5 cm (4.1 in) guns and 3.7 cm (1.5 in) Hotchkiss revolver cannon.

=== Torpedo gunboat ===
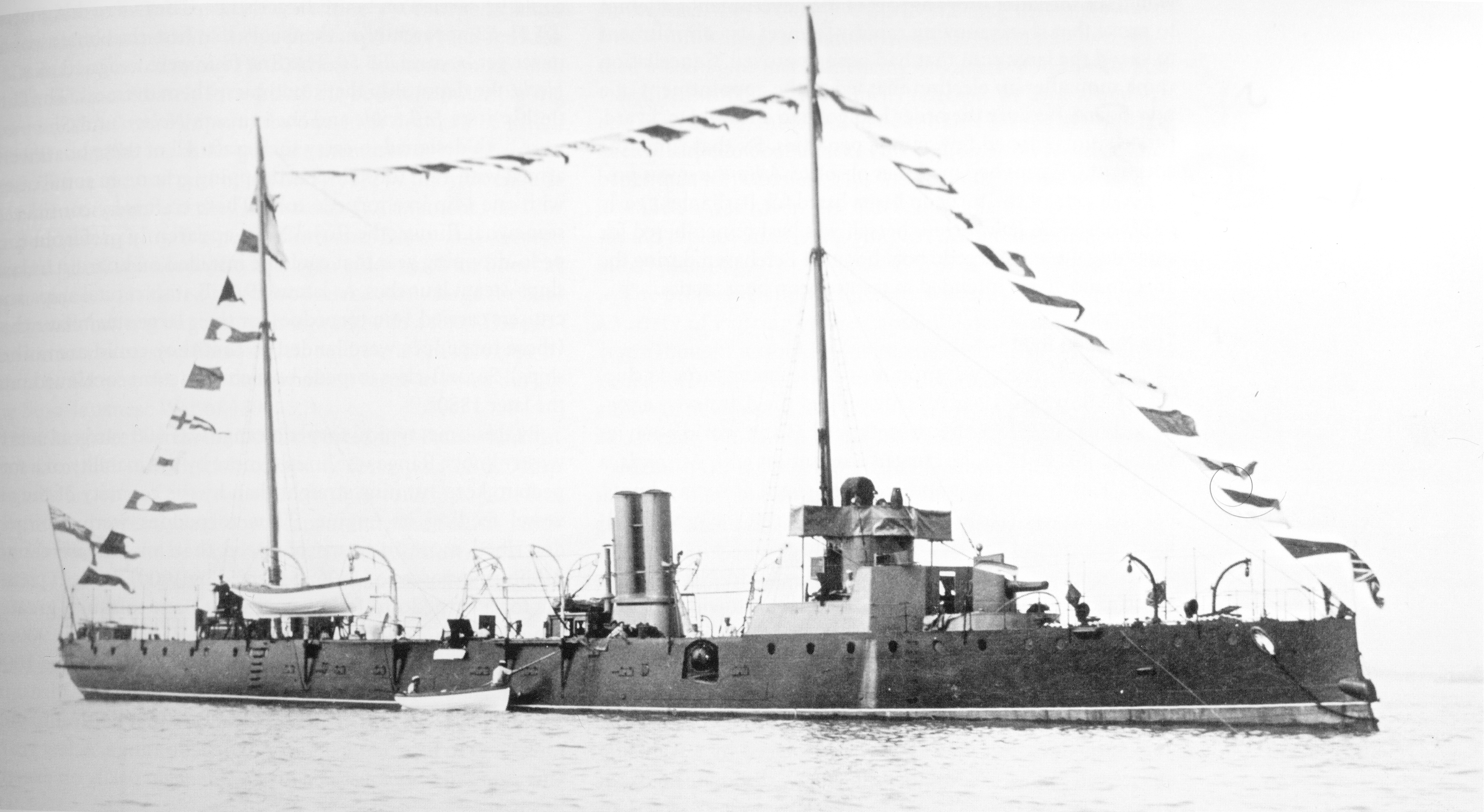
HMS Spider was an early model of torpedo gunboat

The first vessel designed for the explicit purpose of hunting and destroying torpedo boats was the torpedo gunboat. Essentially very small cruisers, torpedo gunboats were equipped with torpedo tubes and an adequate gun armament, intended for hunting down smaller enemy boats. By the end of the 1890s, torpedo gunboats were made obsolete by their more successful contemporaries, the TBDs.

Fernando Villaamil, second officer of the Ministry of the Navy of Spain, in his study of the situation for the minister of the navy, came to the conclusion that what was needed was a new type of enlarged torpedo gunboat, with the ability to escort capital ships on long voyages, to combat the threat of the torpedo boats. He asked several British shipyards to submit proposals capable of fulfilling these specifications. In 1885, the Spanish Navy chose the design submitted by the shipyard of James and George Thomson of Clydebank. Destructor (Destroyer in Spanish) was laid down at the end of the year, launched in 1886, and commissioned in 1887. Some authors consider Destructor to be the first destroyer ever built.

Spanish warship Destructor in 1890

She displaced 348 tons, and was the first warship equipped with twin triple-expansion engines generating 3,784 ihp (2,822 kW), for a maximum speed of 22.6 knots (41.9 km/h), which made her one of the faster ships in the world in 1888. She was armed with one 90 mm (3.5 in) Spanish-designed Hontoria breech-loading gun, four 57 mm (2.2 in) (6-pounder) Nordenfelt guns, two 37 mm (1.5 in) (3-pdr) Hotchkiss cannons and two 15-inch (38 cm) Schwartzkopff torpedo tubes. The ship carried three torpedoes per tube. She carried a crew of 60. In terms of gunnery, dimensions, the specialised design and speed to chase torpedo boats, and her high-seas capabilities, Destructor was a highly influential precursor to the TBD.

Built at the same time, HMS Rattlesnake, designed by Nathaniel Barnaby in 1885, was commissioned in 1887 in response to the Russian War scare. The gunboat was armed with torpedoes and designed for hunting and destroying smaller torpedo boats. Exactly 200 feet (61 m) long and 23 feet (7.0 m) in beam, she displaced 550 tons. Built of steel, Rattlesnake was unarmoured with the exception of a 3/4-inch protective deck. She was armed with a single 4-inch/25-pounder breech-loading gun, six 3-pounder QF guns and four 14-inch (360 mm) torpedo tubes, arranged with two fixed tubes at the bow and a set of torpedo-dropping carriages on either side. Four torpedo reloads were carried.

A number of torpedo gunboat classes followed, including the Grasshopper class, the Sharpshooter class, the Alarm class, and the Dryad class – all built for the Royal Navy during the 1880s and the 1890s. In the 1880s, the Chilean Navy ordered the construction of two Almirante Lynch class torpedo gunboats from the British shipyard Laird Brothers, which specialized in the construction of this type of vessel. The novelty is that one of these Almirante Lynch-class torpedo boats managed to sink the ironclad Blanco Encalada with self-propelled torpedoes in the Battle of Caldera Bay in 1891, thus surpassing its main function of hunting torpedo boats.

== Development of the destroyer class ==
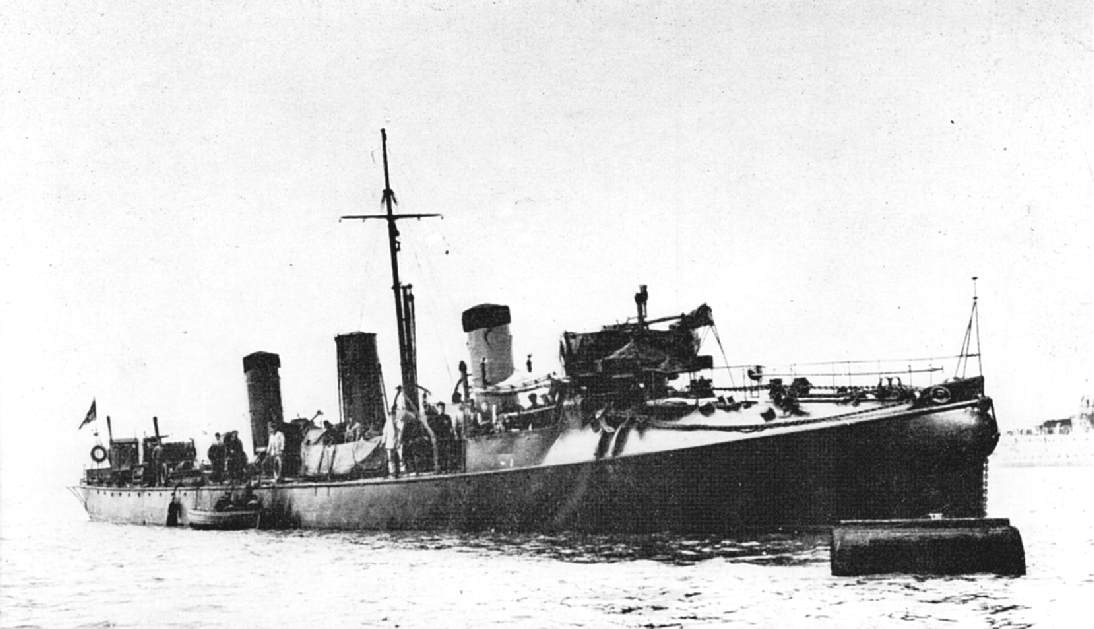
HMS Havock, the first ship formally designated as destroyer class, 1894

The first classes of ships to bear the formal designation TBD were the Daring class of two ships and Havock class of two ships of the Royal Navy.

Early torpedo gunboat designs lacked the range and speed to keep up with the fleet they were supposed to protect. In 1892, the Third Sea Lord, Rear Admiral John "Jacky" Fisher ordered the development of a new type of ships equipped with the then-novel water-tube boilers and quick-firing small-calibre guns. Six ships to the specifications circulated by the admiralty were ordered initially, comprising three different designs each produced by a different shipbuilder: HMS Daring and HMS Decoy from John I. Thornycroft & Company, HMS Havock and HMS Hornet from Yarrows, and HMS Ferret and HMS Lynx from Laird, Son & Company.

These ships all featured a turtleback (i.e. rounded) forecastle that was characteristic of early British TBDs. HMS Daring and HMS Decoy were both built by Thornycroft, displaced 260 tons (287.8 tons full load), and were 185 feet in length. They were armed with one 12-pounder gun and three 6-pounder guns, with one fixed 18-in torpedo tube in the bow plus two more torpedo tubes on a revolving mount abaft the two funnels. Later, the bow torpedo tube was removed and two more 6-pounder guns added, instead. They produced 4,200 hp from a pair of Thornycroft water-tube boilers, giving them a top speed of 27 knots, giving the range and speed to travel effectively with a battle fleet. In common with subsequent early Thornycroft boats, they had sloping sterns and double rudders.

The French navy, an extensive user of torpedo boats, built its first TBD in 1899, with the Durandal-class torpilleur d'escadre. The United States commissioned its first TBD, USS Bainbridge, Destroyer No. 1, in 1902, and by 1906, 16 destroyers were in service with the US Navy.

=== Subsequent improvements ===
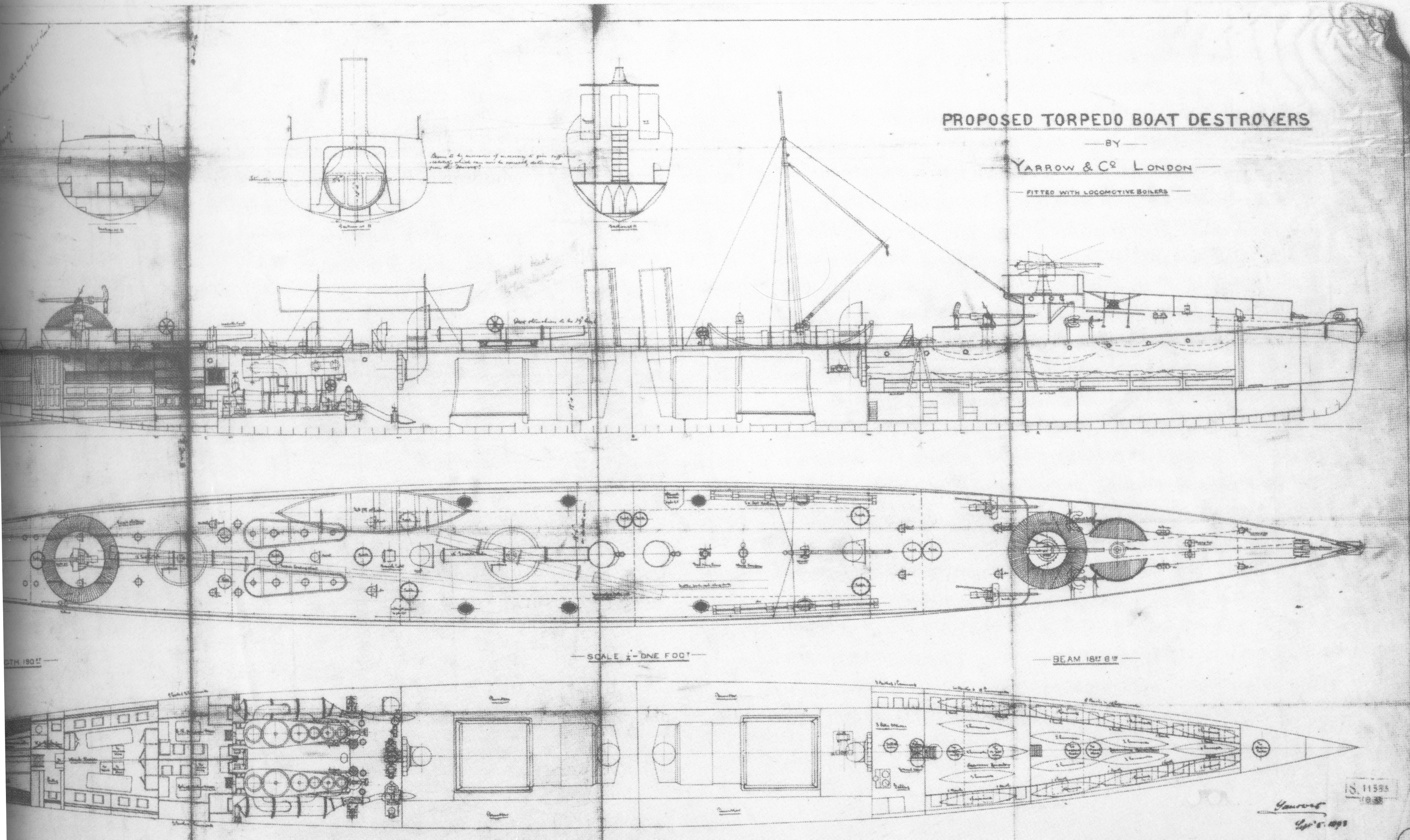
Builders' plans for the British Charger class, built 1894–95

Torpedo boat destroyer designs continued to evolve around the turn of the 20th century in several key ways. The first was the introduction of the steam turbine. The spectacular unauthorized demonstration of the turbine-powered Turbinia at the 1897 Spithead Navy Review, which, significantly, was of torpedo-boat size, prompted the Royal Navy to order a prototype turbine-powered destroyer, HMS Viper of 1899. This was the first turbine warship of any kind, and achieved a remarkable 34 knots (63 km/h; 39 mph) on sea trials. By 1910, the turbine had been widely adopted by all navies for their faster ships.

The second development was the replacement of the torpedo boat-style turtleback foredeck by a raised forecastle for the new River-class destroyers built in 1903, which provided better sea-keeping and more space below deck.

The first warship to use only fuel oil propulsion was the Royal Navy's TBD HMS Spiteful, after experiments in 1904, although the obsolescence of coal as a fuel in British warships was delayed by oil's availability. Other navies also adopted oil, for instance the USN with the Paulding class of 1909. In spite of all this variety, destroyers adopted a largely similar pattern. The hull was long and narrow, with a relatively shallow draft. The bow was either raised in a forecastle or covered under a turtleback; underneath this were the crew spaces, extending 1/4 to 1/3 the way along the hull. Aft of the crew spaces was as much engine space as the technology of the time would allow - several boilers and engines or turbines. Above deck, one or more quick-firing guns were mounted in the bows, in front of the bridge; several more were mounted amidships and astern. Two tube mountings (later on, multiple mountings) were generally found amidships.

Between 1892 and 1914, destroyers became markedly larger; initially 275 tons with a length of 165 feet (50 m) for the Royal Navy's first Havock class of TBDs, up to the First World War with 300-foot (91 m) long destroyers displacing 1,000 tons was not unusual. Construction remained focused on putting the biggest possible engines into a small hull, though, resulting in a somewhat flimsy construction. Often, hulls were built of high-tensile steel only 1/8 in (3.2 mm) thick.

By 1910, the steam-driven displacement (that is, not hydroplaning) torpedo boat had become redundant as a separate type. Germany, nevertheless, continued to build such boats until the end of World War I, although these were effectively small coastal destroyers. In fact, Germany never distinguished between the two types, giving them pennant numbers in the same series and never giving names to destroyers. Ultimately, the term "torpedo boat" came to be attached to a quite different vessel – the very fast-hydroplaning, motor-driven motor torpedo boat.

== Early use and World War I ==
Navies originally built TBDrs to protect against torpedo boats, but admirals soon appreciated the flexibility of the fast, multipurpose vessels that resulted. Vice-Admiral Sir Baldwin Walker laid down destroyer duties for the Royal Navy:

- Screening the advance of a fleet when hostile torpedo craft are about
- Searching a hostile coast along which a fleet might pass
- Watching an enemy's port for the purpose of harassing his torpedo craft and preventing their return
- Attacking an enemy fleet

Early destroyers were extremely cramped places to live, being "without a doubt magnificent fighting vessels ... but unable to stand bad weather". During the Russo-Japanese War in 1904, the commander of the Imperial Japanese Navy TBD Akatsuki described "being in command of a destroyer for a long period, especially in wartime ... is not very good for the health". Stating that he had originally been strong and healthy, he continued, "life on a destroyer in winter, with bad food, no comforts, would sap the powers of the strongest men in the long run. A destroyer is always more uncomfortable than the others, and rain, snow, and sea-water combine to make them damp; in fact, in bad weather, there is not a dry spot where one can rest for a moment."

The Japanese destroyer-commander finished with, "Yesterday, I looked at myself in a mirror for a long time; I was disagreeably surprised to see my face thin, full of wrinkles, and as old as though I were 50. My clothes (uniform) cover nothing but a skeleton, and my bones are full of rheumatism."

In 1898, the US Navy officially classified USS Porter, a 175-foot (53 m) long all steel vessel displacing 165 tons, as a torpedo boat, but her commander, LT. John C. Fremont, described her as "a compact mass of machinery not meant to keep the sea nor to live in ... as five-sevenths of the ship are taken up by machinery and fuel, whilst the remaining two-sevenths, fore and aft, are the crew's quarters; officers forward and the men placed aft. And even in those spaces are placed anchor engines, steering engines, steam pipes, etc. rendering them unbearably hot in tropical regions."

=== Early combat ===
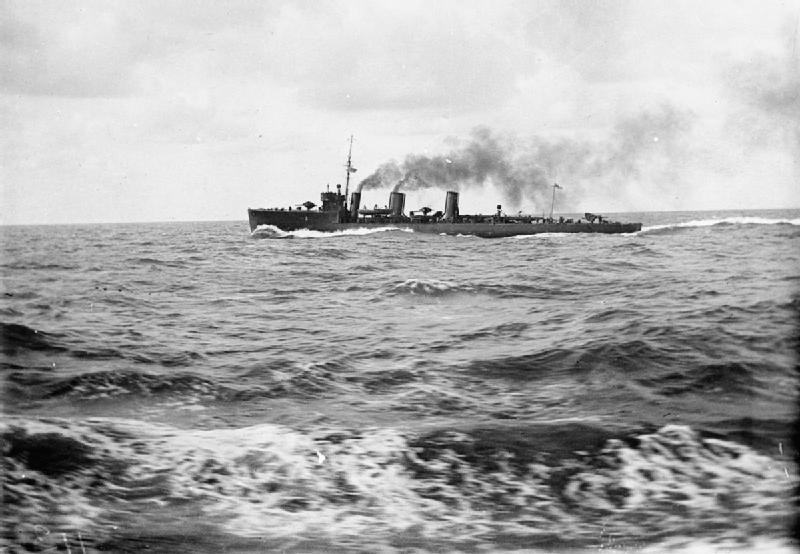
HMS Loyal, of the Laforey class

The TBD's first major use in combat came during the Japanese surprise attack on the Russian fleet anchored in Port Arthur at the opening of the Russo-Japanese War on 8 February 1904.

Three destroyer divisions attacked the Russian fleet in port, firing a total of 18 torpedoes, but only two Russian battleships, Tsesarevich and Retvizan, and a protected cruiser, Pallada, were seriously damaged due to the proper deployment of torpedo nets. Tsesarevich, the Russian flagship, had her nets deployed, with at least four enemy torpedoes "hung up" in them, and other warships were similarly saved from further damage by their nets.

While capital-ship engagements were scarce in World War I, destroyer units engaged almost continually in raiding and patrol actions. The first shot of the war at sea was fired on 5 August 1914 by HMS Lance, one of the 3rd Destroyer Flotilla, in an engagement with the German auxiliary minelayer Königin Luise.

Destroyers were involved in the skirmishes that prompted the Battle of Heligoland Bight, and filled a range of roles in the Battle of Gallipoli, acting as troop transports and as fire-support vessels, as well as their fleet-screening role. Over 80 British destroyers and 60 German torpedo boats took part in the Battle of Jutland, which involved pitched small-boat actions between the main fleets, and several foolhardy attacks by unsupported destroyers on capital ships. Jutland also concluded with a messy night action between the German High Seas Fleet and part of the British destroyer screen.

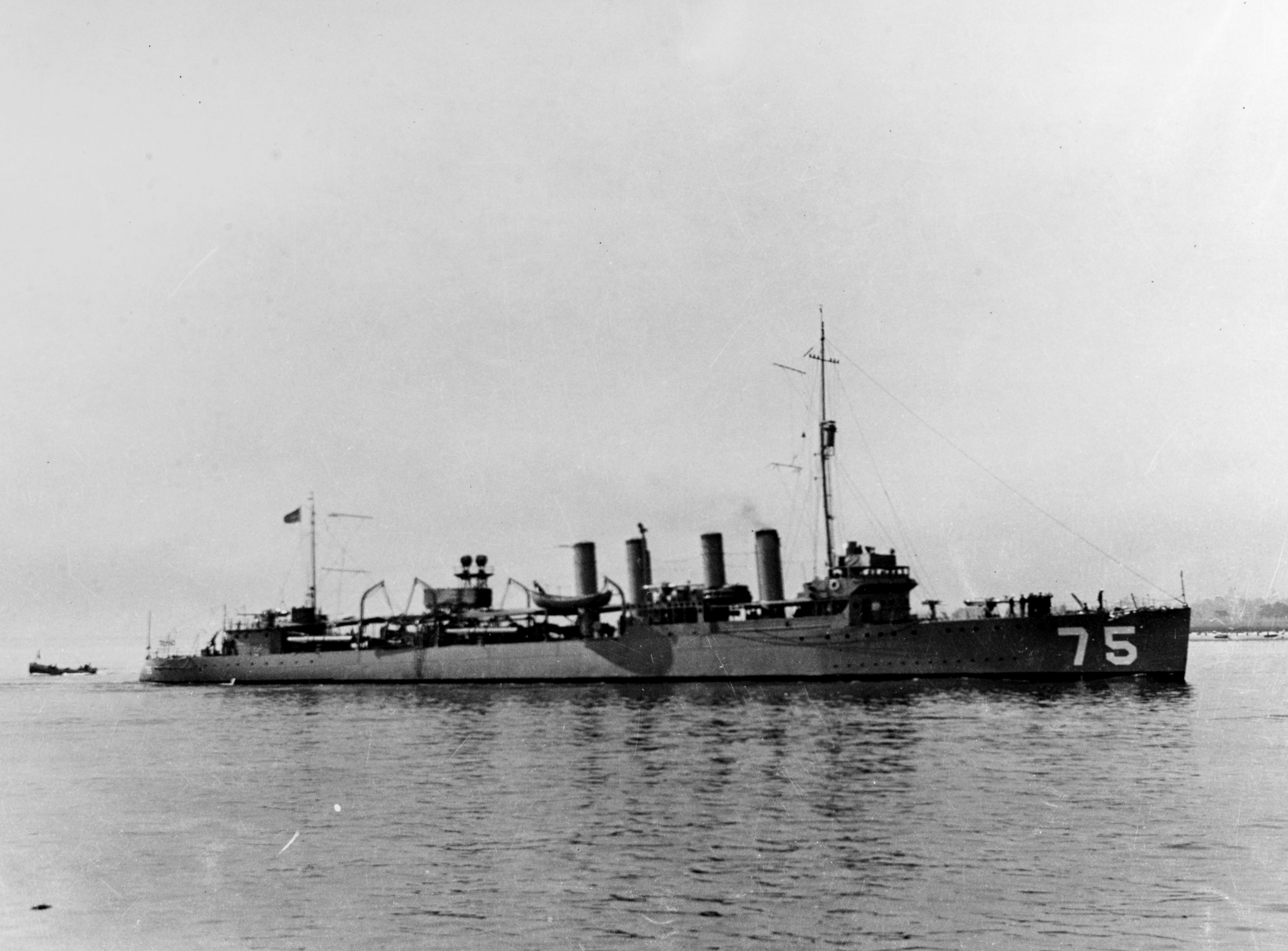
USS Wickes, a Wickes-class destroyer

The threat evolved by World War I with the development of the submarine, or U-boat. The submarine had the potential to hide from gunfire and close underwater to fire torpedoes. Early-war destroyers had the speed and armament to intercept submarines before they submerged, either by gunfire or by ramming. Destroyers also had a shallow enough draft that they were difficult to hit with torpedoes.

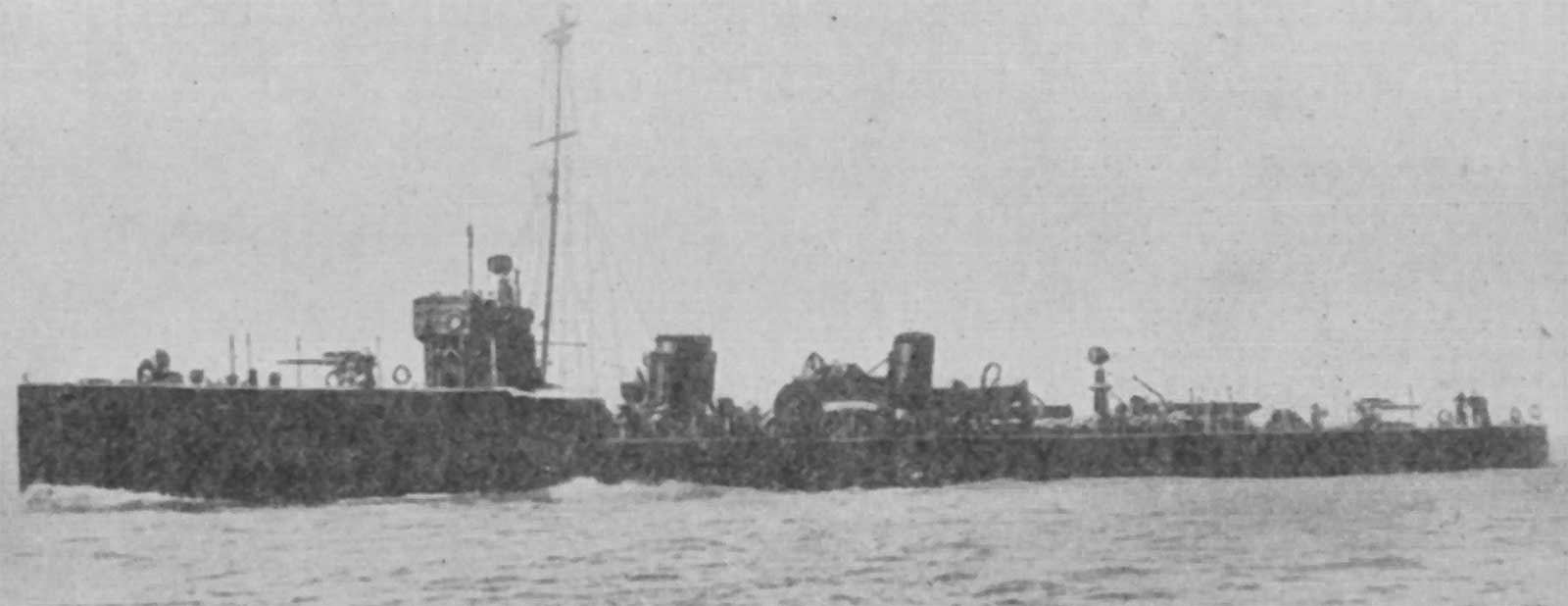
HMS Badger was the first destroyer to successfully ram a submarine.

The desire to attack submarines under water led to rapid destroyer evolution during the war. They were quickly equipped with strengthened bows for ramming, and depth charges and hydrophones for identifying submarine targets. The first submarine casualty credited to a destroyer was the German U-19, rammed by HMS Badger on 29 October 1914. While U-19 was only damaged, the next month, HMS Garry successfully sank U-18. The first depth-charge sinking was on 4 December 1916, when UC-19 was sunk by HMS Llewellyn.

The submarine threat meant that many destroyers spent their time on antisubmarine patrol. Once Germany adopted unrestricted submarine warfare in January 1917, destroyers were called on to escort merchant convoys. US Navy destroyers were among the first American units to be dispatched upon the American entry to the war, and a squadron of Japanese destroyers even joined Allied patrols in the Mediterranean. Patrol duty was far from safe; of the 67 British destroyers lost in the war, collisions accounted for 18, while 12 were wrecked.

At the end of the war, the state-of-the-art was represented by the British W class.

== 1918–1945 ==
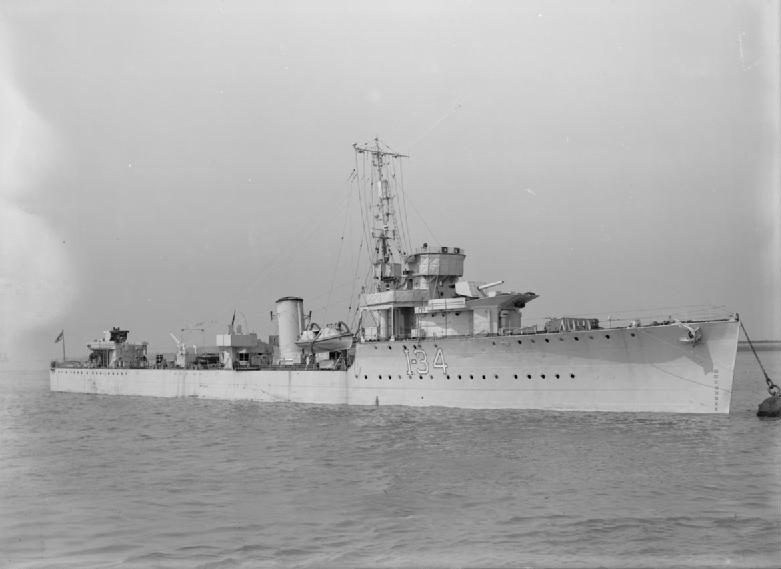
V-class destroyer, HMS Velox

The trend during World War I had been towards larger destroyers with heavier armaments. A number of opportunities to fire at capital ships had been missed during the war, because destroyers had expended all their torpedoes in an initial salvo. The British V and W classes of the late war had sought to address this by mounting six torpedo tubes in two triple mounts, instead of the four or two on earlier models. The V and W classes set the standard of destroyer building well into the 1920s.

Two Romanian destroyers Mărăști and Mărășești, though, had the greatest firepower of all destroyers in the world throughout the first half of the 1920s. This was largely because, between their commissioning in 1920 and 1926, they retained the armament that they had while serving in the Italian Navy as scout cruisers (esploratori). When initially ordered by Romania in 1913, the Romanian specifications envisioned three 120 mm guns, a calibre which would eventually be adopted as the standard for future Italian destroyers. Armed with three 152 mm and four 76 mm guns after being completed as scout cruisers, the two warships were officially re-rated as destroyers by the Romanian Navy. The two Romanian warships were thus the destroyers with the greatest firepower in the world throughout much of the interwar period. As of 1939, when the Second World War started, their artillery, although changed, was still close to cruiser standards, amounting to nine heavy naval guns (five of 120 mm and four of 76 mm). In addition, they retained their two twin 457 mm torpedo tubes and two machine guns, plus the capacity to carry up to 50 mines.

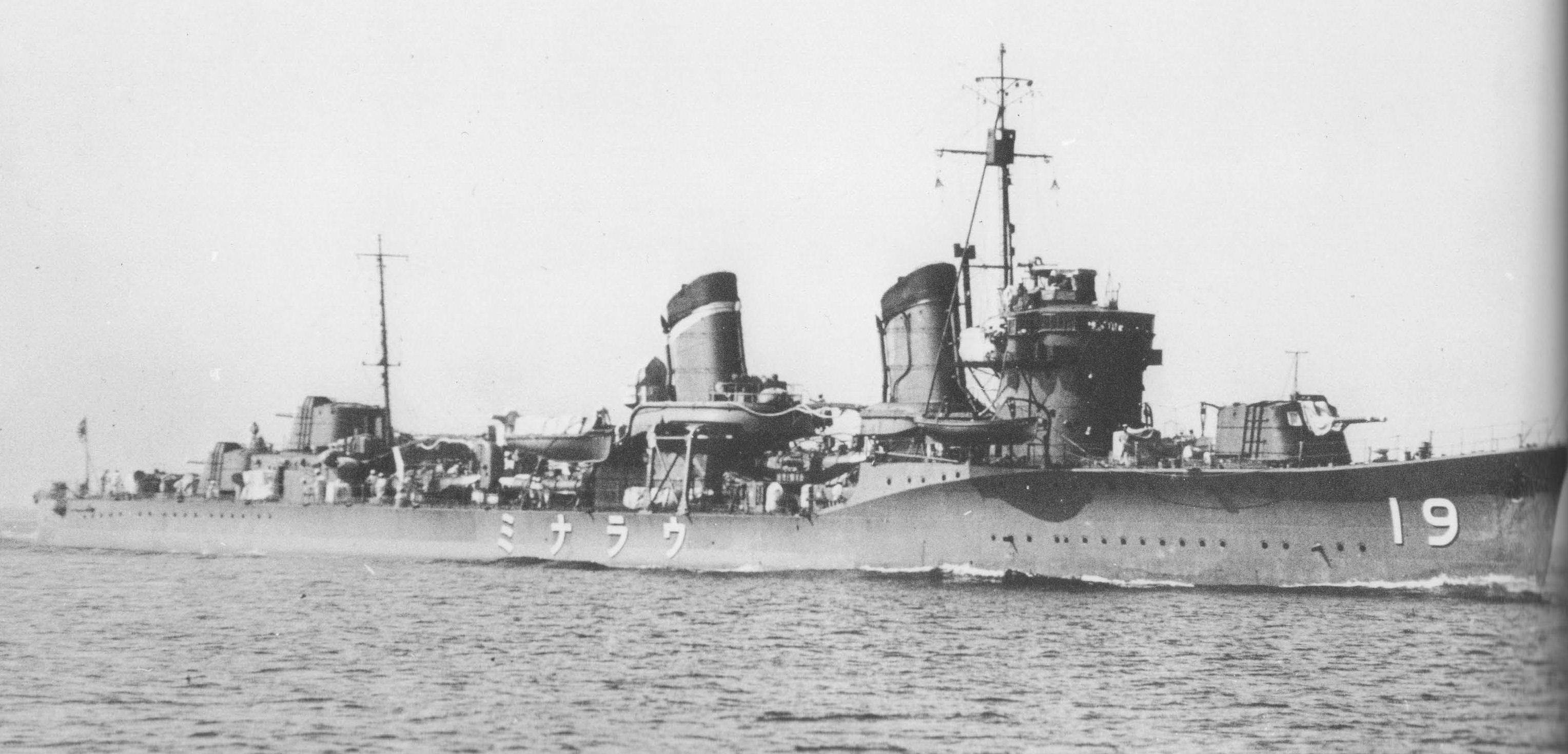
Fubuki-class destroyer, Uranami

The next major innovation came with the Japanese Fubuki class or "special type", designed in 1923 and delivered in 1928. The design was initially noted for its powerful armament of six 5-inch (127 mm) guns and three triple torpedo mounts. The second batch of the class gave the guns high-angle turrets for antiaircraft warfare, and the 24-inch (61 cm), oxygen-fueled Long Lance Type 93 torpedo. The later Hatsuharu class of 1931 further improved the torpedo armament by storing its reload torpedoes close at hand in the superstructure, allowing reloading within 15 minutes.

Most other nations replied with similar larger ships. The US Porter class adopted twin 5-inch (127 mm) guns, and the subsequent Mahan class and Gridley classes (the latter of 1934) increased the number of torpedo tubes to 12 and 16, respectively.

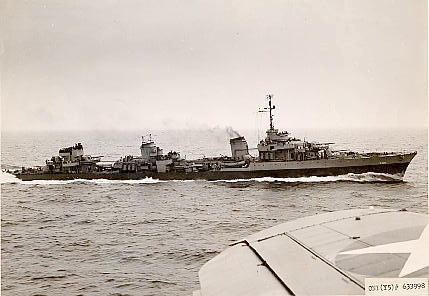
France's Le Fantasque class is the fastest destroyer class ever built.

In the Mediterranean, the Italian Navy's building of very fast light cruisers of the Condottieri class prompted the French to produce exceptional destroyer designs. The French had long been keen on large destroyers, with their Chacal class of 1922 displacing over 2,000 tons and carrying 130 mm guns; a further three similar classes were produced around 1930. The Le Fantasque class of 1935 carried five 138 millimetres (5.4 in) guns and nine torpedo tubes, but could achieve speeds of 45 knots (83 km/h), which remains the record speed for a steamship and for any destroyer. The Italians' own destroyers were almost as swift; most Italian designs of the 1930s were rated at over 38 knots (70 km/h), while carrying torpedoes and either four or six 120 mm guns.

Germany started to build destroyers again during the 1930s as part of Hitler's rearmament program. The Germans were also fond of large destroyers, but while the initial Type 1934 displaced over 3,000 tons, their armament was equal to smaller vessels. This changed from the Type 1936 onwards, which mounted heavy 150 millimetres (5.9 in) guns. German destroyers also used innovative high-pressure steam machinery; while this should have helped their efficiency, it more often resulted in mechanical problems.

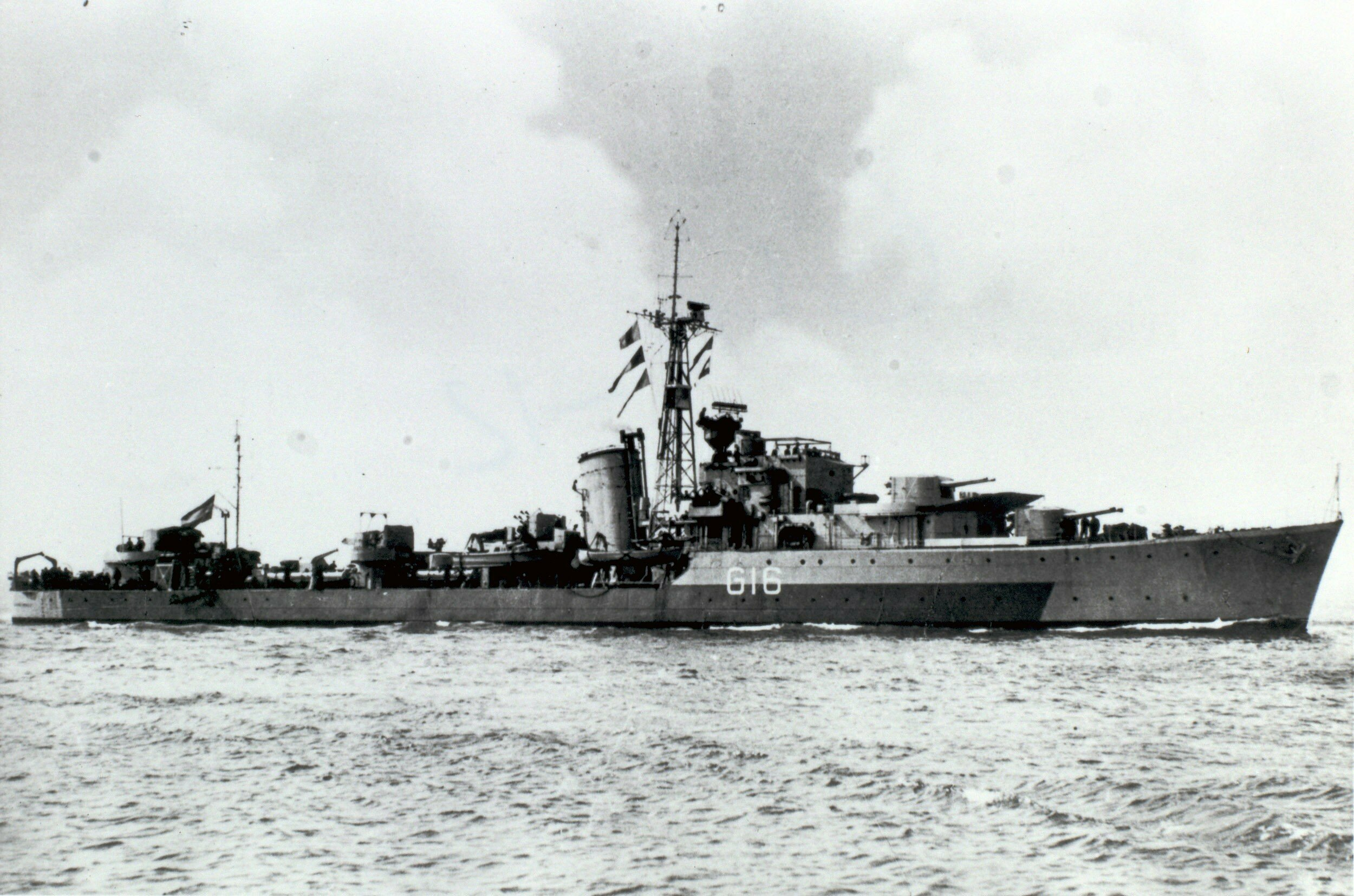
HNLMS Tjerk Hiddes, a British built N-class destroyer, laid down on 22 May 1940 and transferred to the Royal Netherlands Navy

Once German and Japanese rearmament became clear, the British and American navies consciously focused on building destroyers that were smaller, but more numerous than those used by other nations. The British built a series of destroyers (the A class to I class), which were about 1,400 tons standard displacement, and had four 4.7-inch (119 mm) guns and eight torpedo tubes; the American Benson class of 1938 was similar in size, but carried five 5-inch (127 mm) guns and ten torpedo tubes. Realizing the need for heavier gun armament, the British built the Tribal class of 1936 (sometimes called Afridi after one of two lead ships). These ships displaced 1,850 tons and were armed with eight 4.7-inch (119 mm) guns in four twin turrets and four torpedo tubes. These were followed by the J-class and L-class destroyers, with six 4.7-inch (119 mm) guns in twin turrets and eight torpedo tubes.

Antisubmarine sensors included sonar (or ASDIC), although training in their use was indifferent. Antisubmarine weapons changed little, and ahead-throwing weapons, a need recognized in World War I, had made no progress.

=== Later combat ===
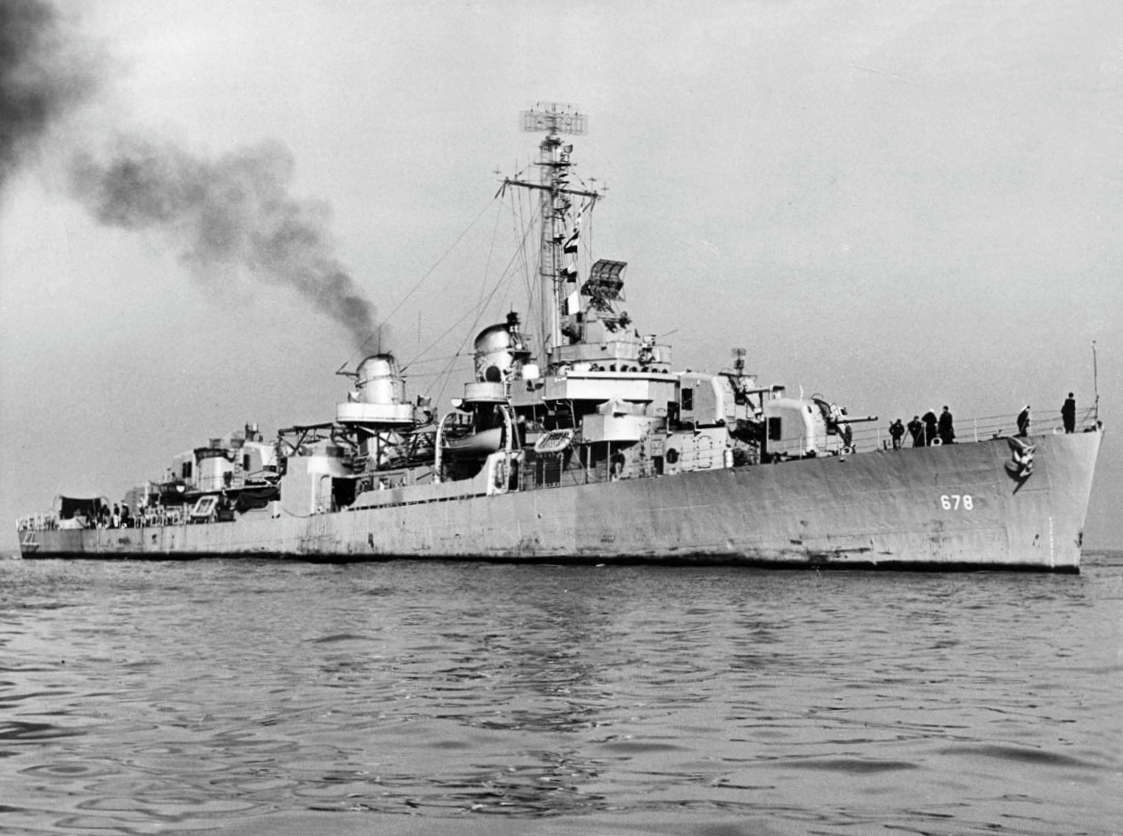
USS McGowan, a Fletcher-class destroyer during World War II

During the 1920s and 1930s, destroyers were often deployed to areas of diplomatic tension or humanitarian disaster. British and American destroyers were common on the Chinese coast and rivers, even supplying landing parties to protect colonial interests. By World War II, the threat had evolved once again. Submarines were more effective, and aircraft had become important weapons of naval warfare; once again the early-war fleet destroyers were ill-equipped for combating these new targets. They were fitted with new light antiaircraft guns, radar, and forward-launched ASW weapons, in addition to their existing dual-purpose guns, depth charges, and torpedoes. Increasing size allowed improved internal arrangement of propulsion machinery with compartmentation, so ships were less likely to be sunk by a single hit. In most cases torpedo and/or dual-purpose gun armament was reduced to accommodate new anti-air and anti-submarine weapons. By this time the destroyers had become large, multi-purpose vessels, expensive targets in their own right. As a result, casualties on destroyers were among the highest. In the US Navy, particularly in World War II, destroyers became known as tin cans due to their light armour compared to battleships and cruisers.

The need for large numbers of antisubmarine ships led to the introduction of smaller and cheaper specialized antisubmarine warships called corvettes and frigates by the Royal Navy and destroyer escorts by the USN. A similar programme was belatedly started by the Japanese (see Matsu-class destroyer). These ships had the size and displacement of the original TBDs from which the contemporary destroyer had evolved.

== Post-World War II ==
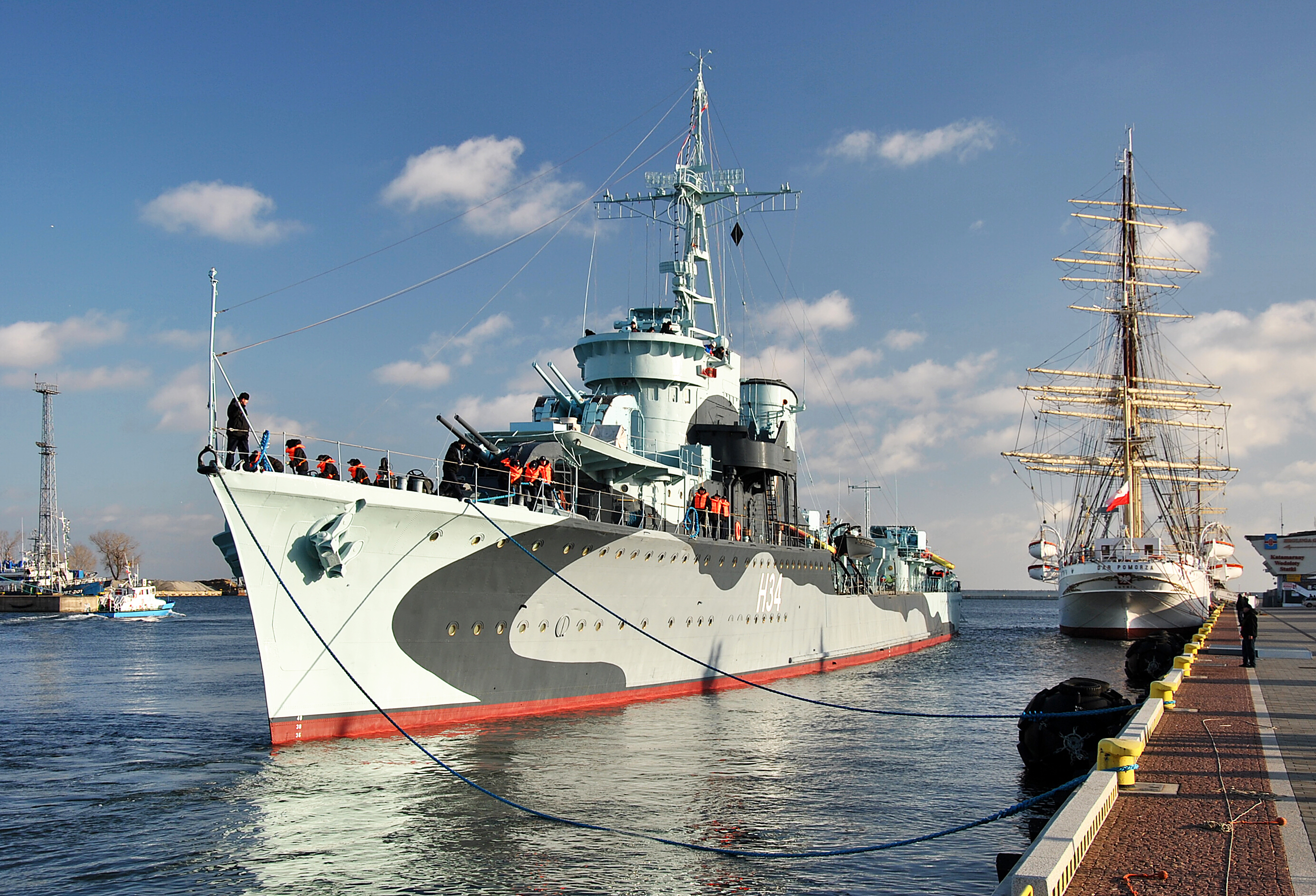
The Polish destroyer ORP Błyskawica is preserved as a museum ship in Gdynia.

Some conventional destroyers completed in the late 1940s and 1950s were built on wartime experience. These vessels were significantly larger than wartime ships and had fully automatic main guns, unit machinery, radar, sonar, and antisubmarine weapons, such as the squid mortar. Examples include the British Daring-class, US Forrest Sherman-class, and the Soviet Kotlin-class destroyers.

Some World War II–vintage ships were modernized for antisubmarine warfare, and to extend their service lives, to avoid having to build (expensive) brand-new ships. Examples include the US FRAM I programme and the British Type 15 frigates converted from fleet destroyers.

The advent of surface-to-air missiles and surface-to-surface missiles, such as the Exocet, in the early 1960s changed naval warfare. Guided-missile destroyers (DDG in the US Navy) were developed to carry these weapons and protect the fleet from air, submarine, and surface threats. Examples include the Soviet Kashin class, the British County class, and the US Charles F. Adams class.

The 21st century destroyers tend to display features such as large, slab sides without complicated corners and crevices to keep the radar cross-section small, vertical launch systems to carry a large number of missiles at high readiness to fire, and helicopter flight decks and hangars.

== Operators ==
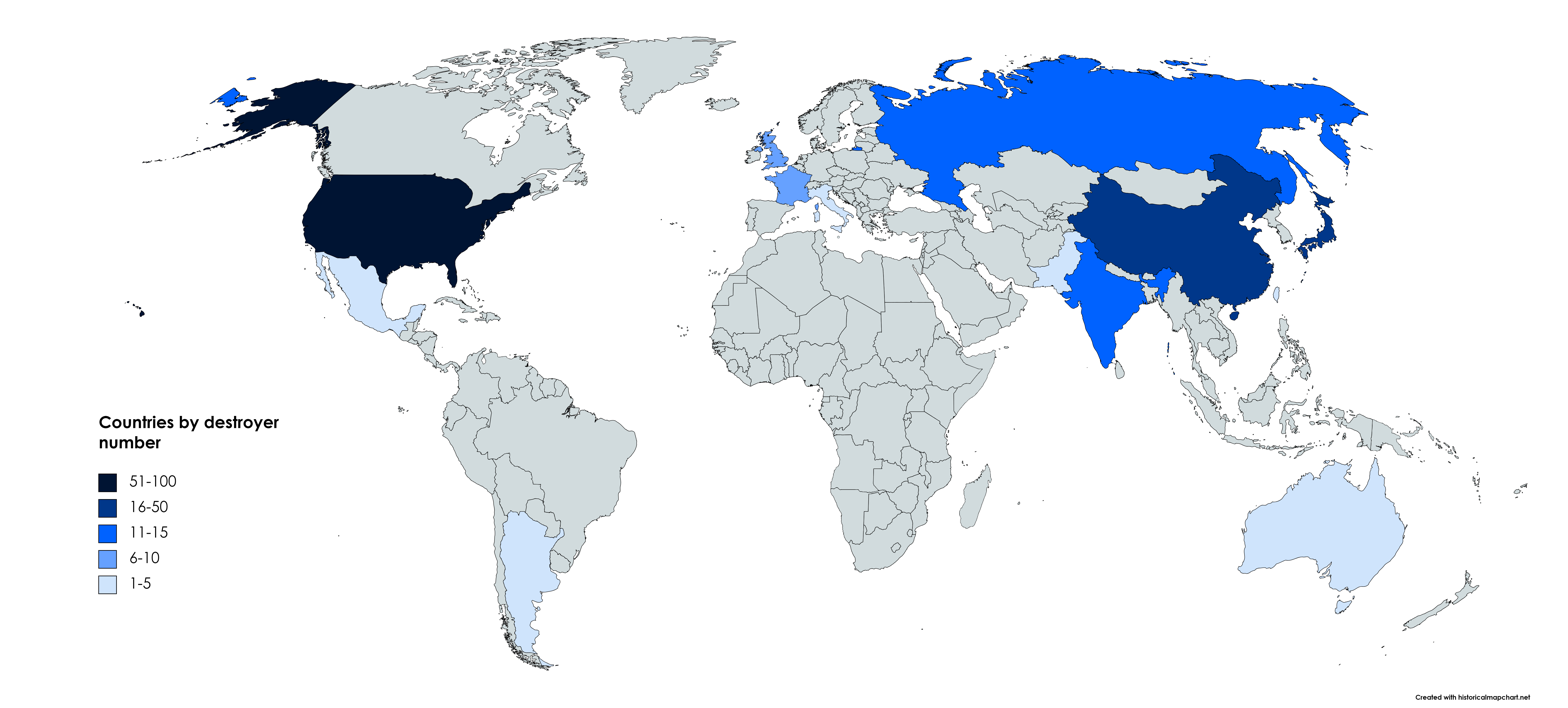
Countries by destroyer number (countries which operate destroyers in blue, specific colour code shown on image)

- Royal Australian Navy operates three Hobart-class destroyers.
- People's Liberation Army Navy operates Type 055 destroyers, two Type 052B destroyers, six Type 052C destroyers, 24 Type 052D destroyers and two Type 051C destroyers. China also operates two Type 052 destroyers, one Type 051B destroyer and four Sovremenny-class destroyers that are of older models. The Type 055 is considered to be a cruiser by NATO and the U.S. Department of Defense for its tonnage and capability matching that of the Ticonderoga-class cruiser.
- Republic of China Navy (Taiwan) operates four Kidd-class destroyers, purchased from the United States.
- French Navy operates two Horizon-class frigates and eight FREMM Multipurpose frigates of the Aquitaine-class variant. The French Navy does not use the term "destroyer" but rather "first-rate frigate" for these ship types, but they are marked with the NATO "D" hull code which places them in the destroyer type, as opposed to "F" for frigate.
- Hellenic Navy has HS Velos, a Fletcher-class destroyer, remains like museum in commission due to her historical significance.
- Indian Navy operates four Visakhapatnam-class destroyers, three Kolkata-class destroyers, three Delhi-class destroyer, and three Rajput-class destroyers.
- Italian Navy operates two Durand de la Penne-class destroyers and two Orizzonte-class destroyers.
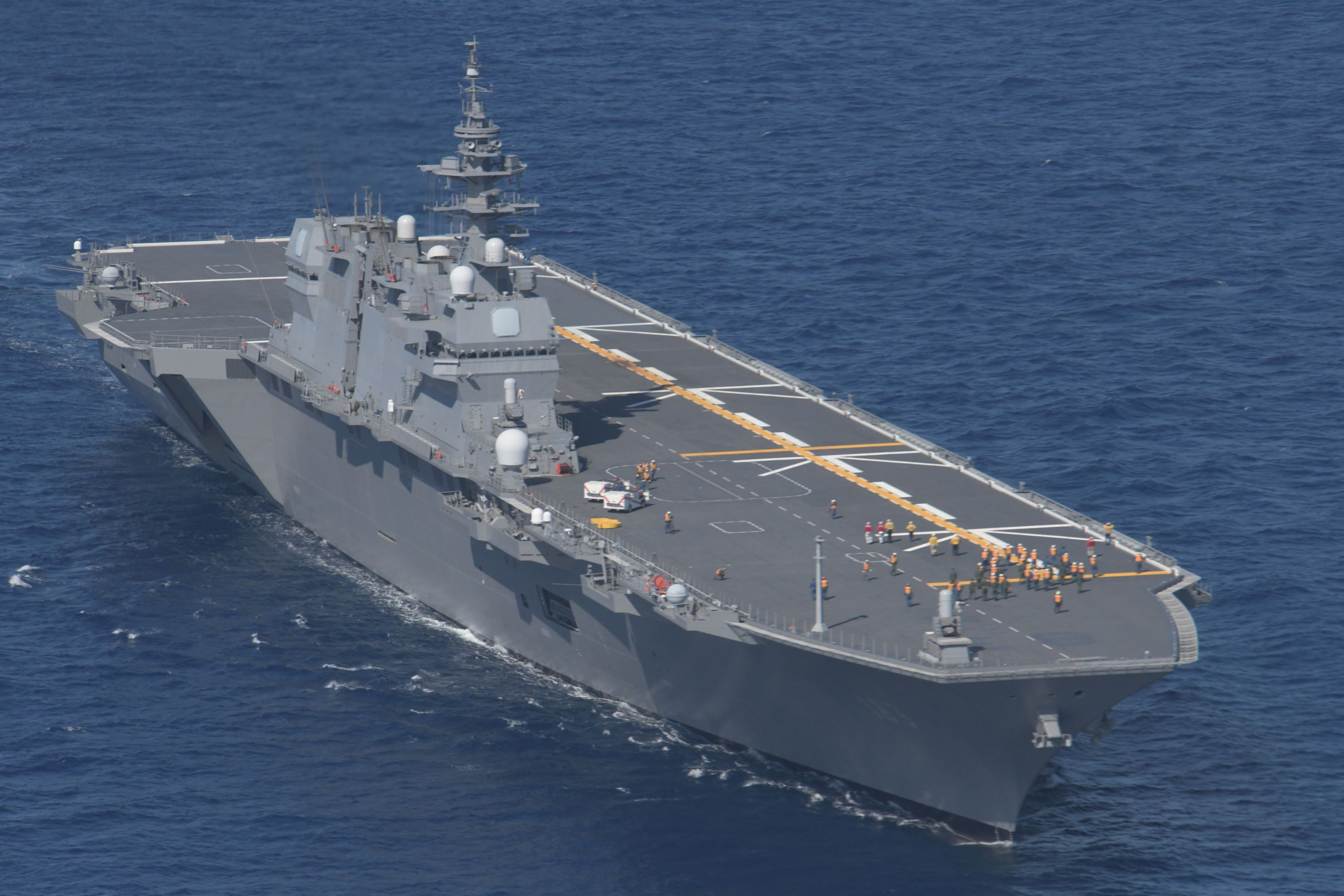
  The Japanese Izumo class, internationally regarded as helicopter carriers
- Japan Maritime Self-Defense Force operates two Maya-class, two Atago-class, four Kongō-class, two Asahi-class, four Akizuki-class, five Takanami-class, nine Murasame-class, eight Asagiri-class, and two Hatakaze-class destroyers, along with six Abukuma-class destroyer escorts. Japan also operates two Izumo-class and two Hyūga-class helicopter destroyers, internationally regarded as helicopter carriers.
- Republic of Korea Navy operates three Sejong the Great-class, six Chungmugong Yi Sun-shin-class and three Gwanggaeto the Great-class destroyers.
- Korean People's Navy operates two Choe Hyon-class destroyers.
- Polish Navy has the Grom-class destroyer ORP Błyskawica which remains ceremonially in commission due to her historical significance.
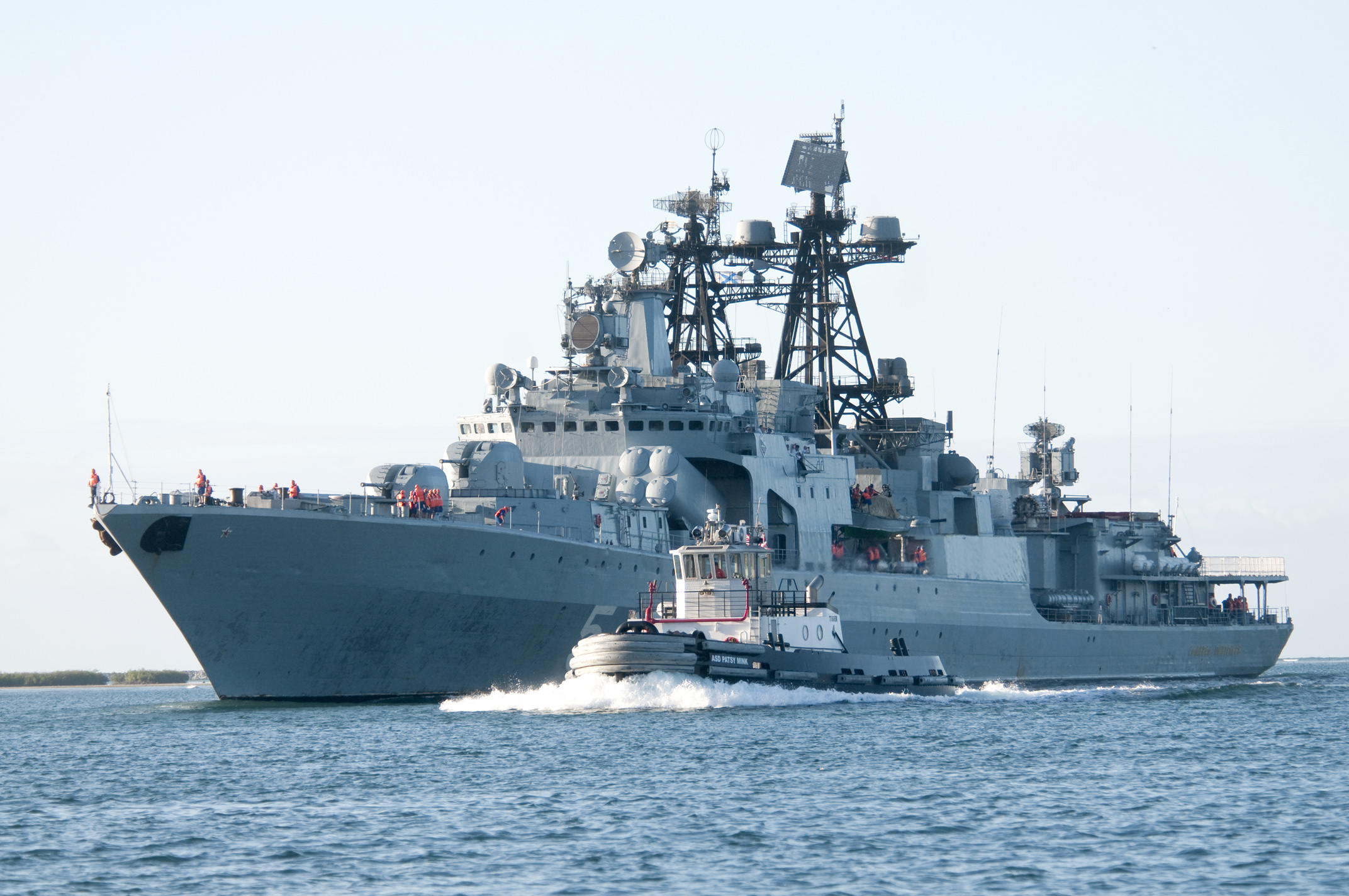
  Admiral Panteleyev, an Udaloy-class guided-missile destroyer of the Russian Navy
- Russian Navy The Russian Navy operates two Sovremenny-class and eight Udaloy-class destroyers.
- Royal Navy operates six Type 45 or Daring-class destroyers.
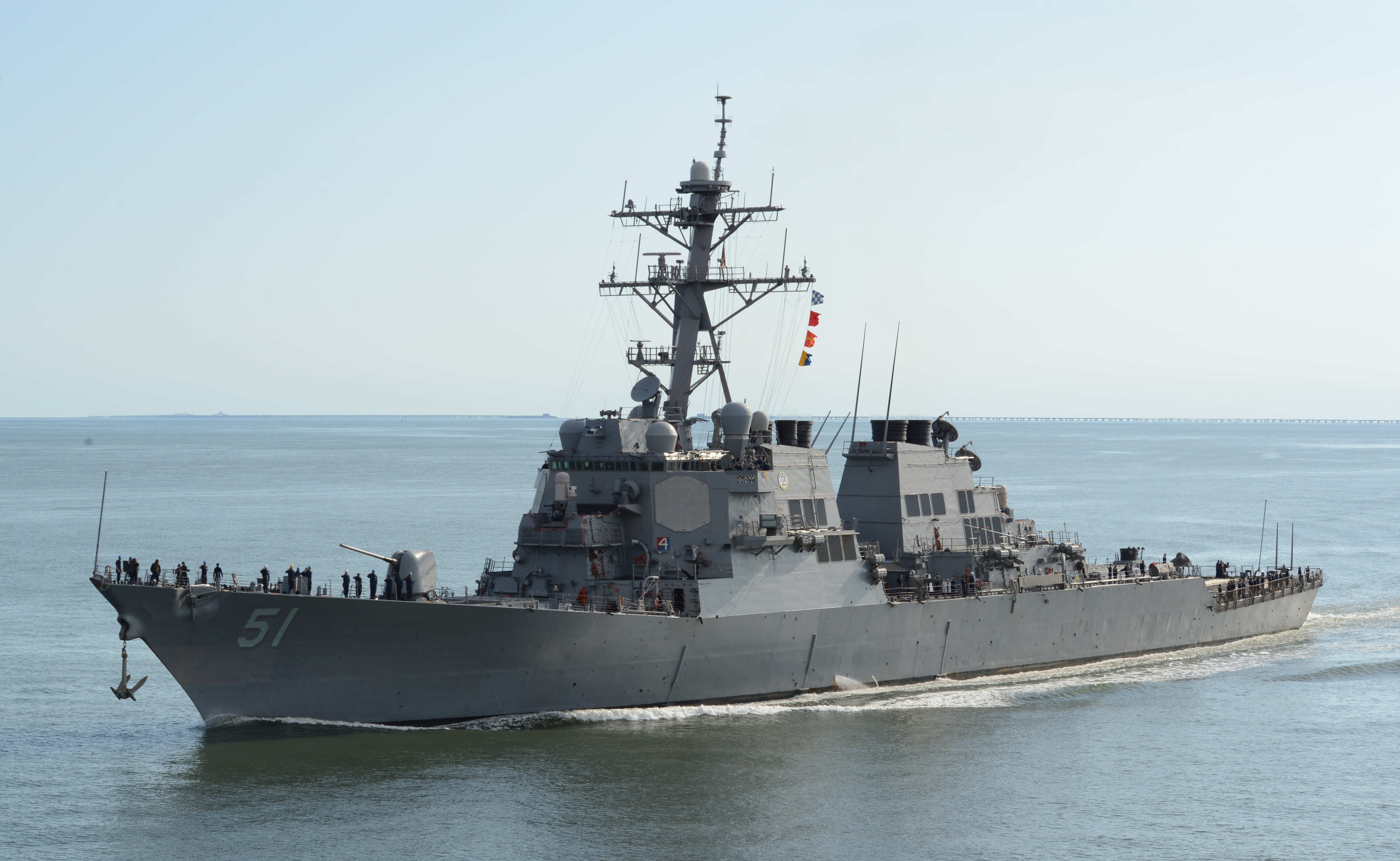
  USS Arleigh Burke, the lead ship of her class of guided-missile destroyers
- United States Navy operates 73 active Arleigh Burke-class guided-missile destroyers (DDGs) of a planned class of 92, and also has two active Zumwalt-class destroyer of a planned class of three, all as of December 2022.

=== Ships equivalent to frigates ===
- Argentine Navy operates three Almirante Brown-class destroyers. This class's hull is MEKO 360H2 frigate.

=== Ships of note classed as frigates ===
- Egyptian Navy operates the ENS Tahya Misr. This is one of the Aquitaine-class variants of the FREMM Multipurpose frigates purchased from France, which is classified as a destroyer by France.
- German Navy operates three Sachsen-class frigates and four Baden-Württemberg-class frigates. These ships are officially classified as frigates by Germany, but regarded as destroyers internationally due to size and capability.
- Royal Moroccan Navy operates the Mohammed VI. This is one of the Aquitaine-class variants of the FREMM Multipurpose frigates purchased from France, which is classified as a destroyer by France.
- Royal Netherlands Navy operates four De Zeven Provinciën-class frigates. These ships are classified as frigates by the Netherlands, but regarded as destroyers internationally due to size and capability.
- Royal Norwegian Navy operates four Fridtjof Nansen-class frigates. These ships are subclasses of Spain's Alvaro de Bazan-class, and classified as frigates, but are regarded as destroyers due to their size and armament.
- Romanian Naval Forces operates Mărășești. This ship was classified as a destroyer from 1990 to 2001, when she was reclassified as a frigate. No official reason was given for this and there was no change in armament or capability, thus remaining in the destroyer type.
- Spanish Navy operates five Álvaro de Bazán-class frigates. These ships are officially classified as a frigates by Spain, but due to their size and capabilities are regarded internationally as destroyers. They also served as the basis for Australia's Hobart-class destroyers.

=== Disputed classes ===
The following are classified as destroyers by their respective operators, but, due to their size and capabilities, are considered to be cruisers by some, all having full load displacements of at least 10,000 tons:

- People's Liberation Army Navy: The first Type 055 destroyer was launched by China in June 2017 and was commissioned on 12 January 2020 (as of 2023, 8 are in service). Despite being classified as a destroyer by its operator, many naval analysts believe that it is far too large and too well equipped to be considered a destroyer, and is classified by the United States Defense Department as such.
- Japan Maritime Self-Defense Force: 2 Atago-class destroyers, 2 Hyūga-class helicopter destroyers, 2 Maya-class destroyers. Despite the official classification of these ships as destroyers, these vessels are of a displacement greater than most of the world's destroyer classes. The Maya-class ships incorporate a level of armament more akin to cruisers. The Hyūga-class ships, despite officially being classified as helicopter destroyers, incorporate a level of armament more akin to helicopter cruisers than helicopter carriers. The even larger Izumo-class vessels were classed as destroyers as well until being reclassified as "aircraft-carrying multi-role cruisers" (CVM) in 2025.
- Republic of Korea Navy: 4 Sejong the Great-class destroyers. Despite their classification as a destroyer, many naval analysts feel they are in fact cruisers due to their size and armament, which are both greater than most of the world's destroyer classes.
- United States Navy: 2 Zumwalt-class destroyers (plus one on sea trials as of 2026). Even if considered a destroyer, they remain significantly larger and more capable than the only definitive cruisers in USN service, the Ticonderoga-class.

=== Former operators ===
- Austro-Hungarian Navy lost its entire navy upon the Empire's collapse following World War I.
- Navy of the Ukrainian People's Republic lost its entire navy upon its conquest by the Bolsheviks in 1921.
- Estonian Navy sold its two Orfey-class destroyer and Izyaslav-class destroyers to Peru in 1933.
- Manchukuo Imperial Navy transferred its only Momo-class destroyer back to Japan in 1942.
- Bulgarian Navy decommissioned its only Ognevoy-class destroyer in 1963.
- Royal Danish Navy decommissioned its last Hunt-class destroyer in 1965.
- Portuguese Navy decommissioned its last Douro-class destroyer in 1967.
- Israeli Navy decommissioned its last Z-class destroyer in 1972.
- Dominican Navy decommissioned its H-class destroyer in 1972.
- Republic of Vietnam Navy transferred its remaining Edsall-class destroyer escort to The Philippines in 1975 following the Fall of Saigon.
- South African Navy decommissioned its last W-class destroyer in 1976.
- Yugoslav Navy decommissioned its only destroyer, Split in 1980.
- Swedish Navy decommissioned both its Halland-class destroyer and four Östergötland-class destroyers in 1982 following defence reviews.
- Colombian National Navy decommissioned both its Halland-class destroyers and its lone Allen M. Sumner-class destroyer in 1986.
- National Navy of Uruguay decommissioned its last Cannon-class destroyer escort in 1991.
- Tunisian National Navy lone Edsall-class destroyer escort was destroyed by a fire in 1992.
- Ecuadorian Navy decommissioned its lone Dealey-class destroyer escort in 1994.
- Vietnam People's Navy decommissioned its lone Edsall-class destroyer escort in 1997.
- Turkish Naval Forces decommissioned its last Gearing-class destroyer in 2000.
- Polish Navy decommissioned its lone Kashin-class destroyer in 2003.
- Hellenic Navy decommissioned its last Charles F. Adams-class destroyer in 2004.
- Indonesian Navy decommissioned its last Claud Jones-class destroyer escorts in 2005.
- Chilean Navy decommissioned its last County-class destroyer in 2006.
- Peruvian Navy decommissioned its last Daring-class destroyer in 2007.
- Brazilian Navy decommissioned its last Garcia-class destroyer escort in 2008.
- Bolivarian Navy of Venezuela decommissioned its last Almirante Clemente-class destroyer in 2011.
- Mexican Navy decommissioned its last Edsall-class destroyer escort in 2015.
- Royal Canadian Navy decommissioned its last Iroquois-class destroyer in 2017.
- Philippine Navy decommissioned its last Cannon-class destroyer escort in 2018.
- Pakistan Navy decommissioned its last Tariq-class destroyer in 2023.
- Royal Thai Navy decommissioned its last Cannon-class destroyer escort in 2025.
- Islamic Republic of Iran Navy saw all four of its remaining Moudge-class "destroyers" sunk in the 2026 Iran War.

== Future development ==
- The Brazilian Navy plans to build 7,000-ton destroyers after the delivery of the new frigates, and TKMS presented to the Navy its most modern 7,200-ton MEKO A-400 air defence destroyer, an updated version of the German F-125-class frigates. The similarities between the projects and the high rate of commonality between requirements were also crucial for the consortium's victory.
- The Royal Canadian Navy is building up to 15 River-class destroyers based on the Royal Navy's Type 26 Global Combat Ship. They will be more powerful than the Type 26, being fitted with the Aegis Combat System and long range surface-to-air and surface-to-surface missiles.
- The People's Liberation Army Navy is adding six more Type 052D destroyer and sixteen more Type 055 destroyer class ships to its navy.
- The French Navy is building five new Amiral Ronarc'h-class destroyers (classed as "first rank frigates" in the French Navy).
- The Hellenic Navy has ordered three Frégate de défense et d'intervention (with an option on a fourth) from France.
- The Indian Navy has begun development of its Project-18 Next Generation Destroyers.
- The Islamic Republic of Iran Navy is building 1-2 Khalije Fars-class destroyers.
- The Italian Navy is researching development into their new DDX project to replace their Durand da le Penne-class destroyers.
- The Japan Maritime Self-Defense Force is developing plans for its DDR Destroyer Revolution Project.
- The Philippine Navy will receive 5 Abukuma-class destroyer escorts from Japan starting in 2027.
- The Republic of Korea Navy has begun development of its KDX-IIA destroyers. These ships are to be a subclass of South Korea's Chungmugong Yi Sun-shin-class destroyers. The first unit is expected to enter service in 2019. Additionally, Sejong the Great-class destroyers are being built.
- The Russian Navy has begun development of its Lider-class destroyer. Design work was ongoing as of 2020.
- The Turkish Naval Forces is currently developing its TF2000-class destroyer as the largest part of the MILGEM project. A total of seven ships will be constructed and will specialise in anti-air warfare.
- The United Kingdom's Royal Navy had started planning for a new class of destroyer, the Type 83 destroyer after the unveiling of these plans in the 2021 defence white paper. The class had been projected to replace the Type 45 destroyer fleet beginning in the latter 2030s. However, the project was cancelled in 2026 in favor of a cheaper "Common Combat Vessel".
- The United States Navy has 19 additional Arleigh Burke destroyers planned or under construction. The new ships will be the upgraded "flight III" version. The United States has also started development of its DDG(X) next-generation destroyer project. Construction of the first ship is expected to start in 2028.

== Destroyers in preservation ==
Many historic destroyers are preserved as museum ships

- USS The Sullivans (DD-537) in Buffalo, New York, USA
- USS Kidd (DD-661) in Baton Rouge, Louisiana, USA
- USS Cassin Young (DD-793) in Boston, Massachusetts, USA
- USS Laffey (DD-724) in Charleston, South Carolina, USA
- USS Edson (DD-946) in Bay City, Michigan, USA
- USS Turner Joy (DD-951) in Bremerton, Washington, USA
- USS Slater (DE-766) in Albany, New York, USA
- USS Stewart (DE-238) in Galveston, Texas, USA
- HMS Cavalier (R73) in Chatham, Kent, UK
- HMCS Haida in Hamilton, Ontario, Canada
- HMAS Vampire (D11) in Sydney, New South Wales, Australia
- FS Maillé-Brézé in Nantes, Pays de la Loire, France
- FGS Mölders in Wilhelmshaven, Lower Saxony, Germany
- ORP Błyskawica in Gdynia, Pomeranian Voivodeship, Poland
- HSwMS Småland in Gothenburg, Västergötland, Sweden
- HS Velos in Thessaloniki, Central Macedonia, Greece
- TCG Gayret in Izmit, Kocaeli Province, Turkey
- RFS Bespokoyny in Kronshtadt, Saint Petersburg, Russia
- RFS Smetlivy in Sevastopol, Crimea, occupied region of Ukraine.
- ROKS Jeong Ju in Dangjin, South Chungcheong Province, South Korea
- ROCS Te Yang in Tainan City, Tainan County, Taiwan
- CNS Anshan in Qingdao, Shandong, China
- CNS Changchun in Rushan, Shandong, China
- CNS Chongqing in Tianjin, China
- CNS Dalian in Liugong Island, Shandong, China
- CNS Jinan in Qingdao, Shandong, China
- CNS Nanchang in Nanchang, Jiangxi, China
- CNS Nanjing in Shipu, Xiangshan County, Zhejiang, China
- CNS Nanning in Fangchenggang, Guangxi, China
- CNS Xi'an in Wuhan, Hubei, China
- CNS Xining in Taizhou, Jiangsu, China
- CNS Yinchuan in Yinchuan, Ningxia, China
- CNS Zhuhai in Chongqing, China
- BNS Comandante Bauru in Rio de Janeiro, Brazil
- HTMS Pin Klao in Sattahip, Thailand

=== Former Museums ===
- USS Barry (DD-933) in Washington, D.C. from 1984-2015
- HMCS Fraser in Bridgewater, Nova Scotia from 1998-2009
- CNS Taiyuan in Dalian, China from 1991-2026
- ROKS Jeon Buk in Gangneung, South Korea from 1999-2021
- ROKS Gangwon in Jinhae, South Korea from 2000-2016
- ORP Burza in Gdynia, Poland from 1960-1977
- ARV Zulia in Maracaibo, Venezuela from 1978-1983

== See also ==
- List of destroyer classes
- United States Navy 1975 ship reclassification
- Bombardment of Cherbourg
- List of destroyers of the Second World War
