= Mykonos windmills =

Feature on the Greek island

Coordinates: 37.4445°N 25.3256°E

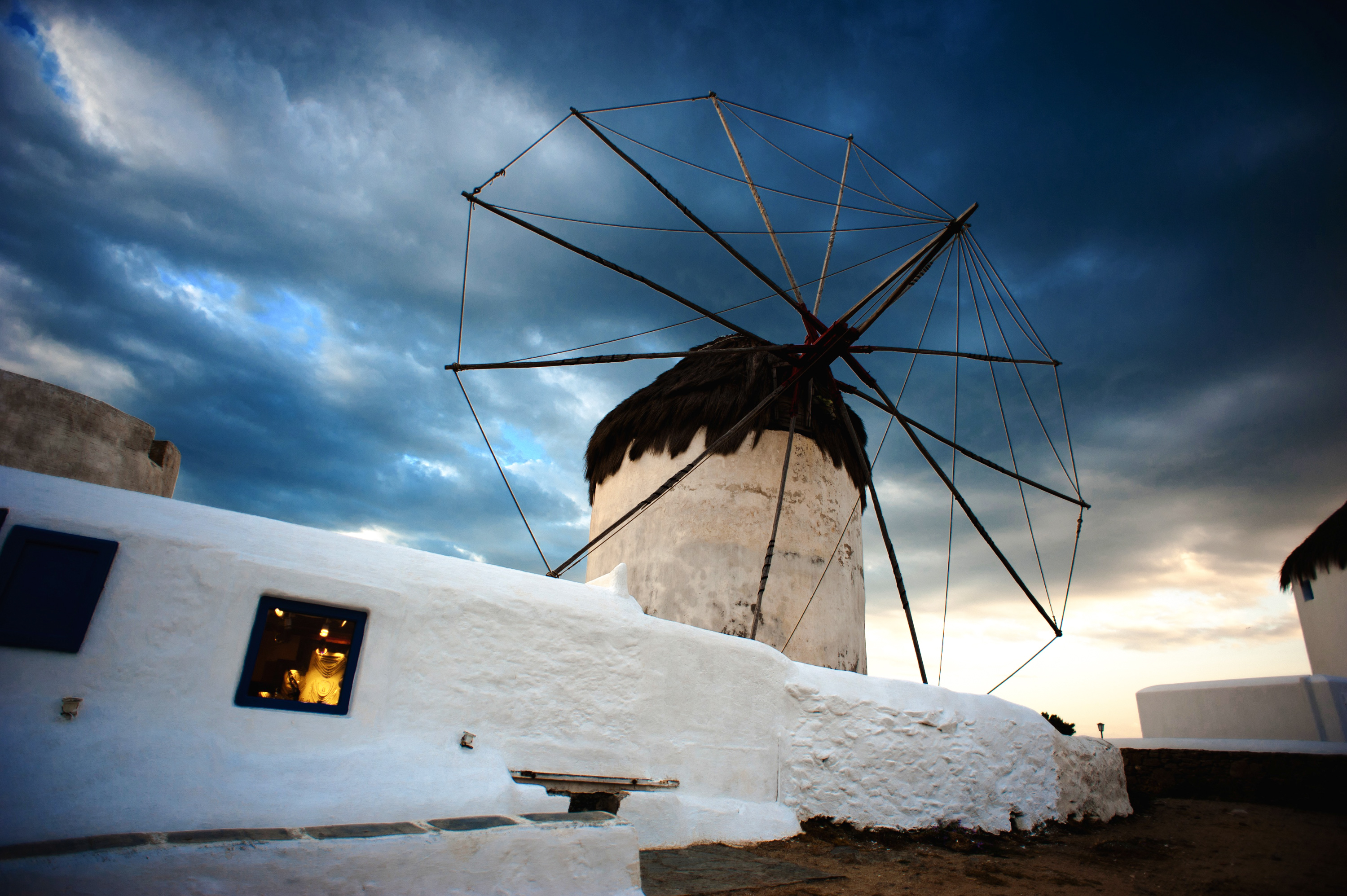
Against Greek skies, one of the Mykonos Island Windmills, Chora. Cyclades, Aegean Sea, Greece

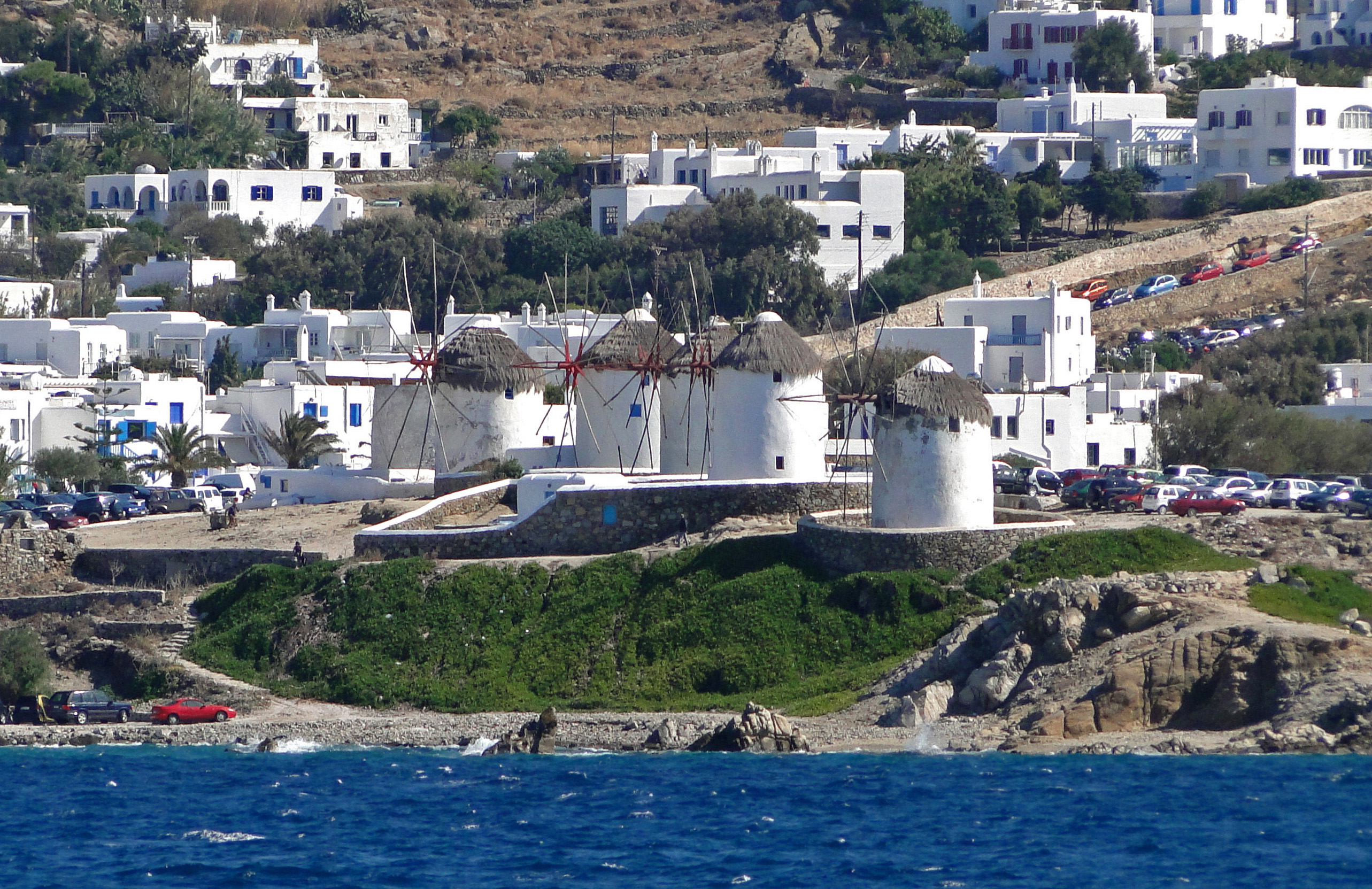
Five of the Mykonos windmills

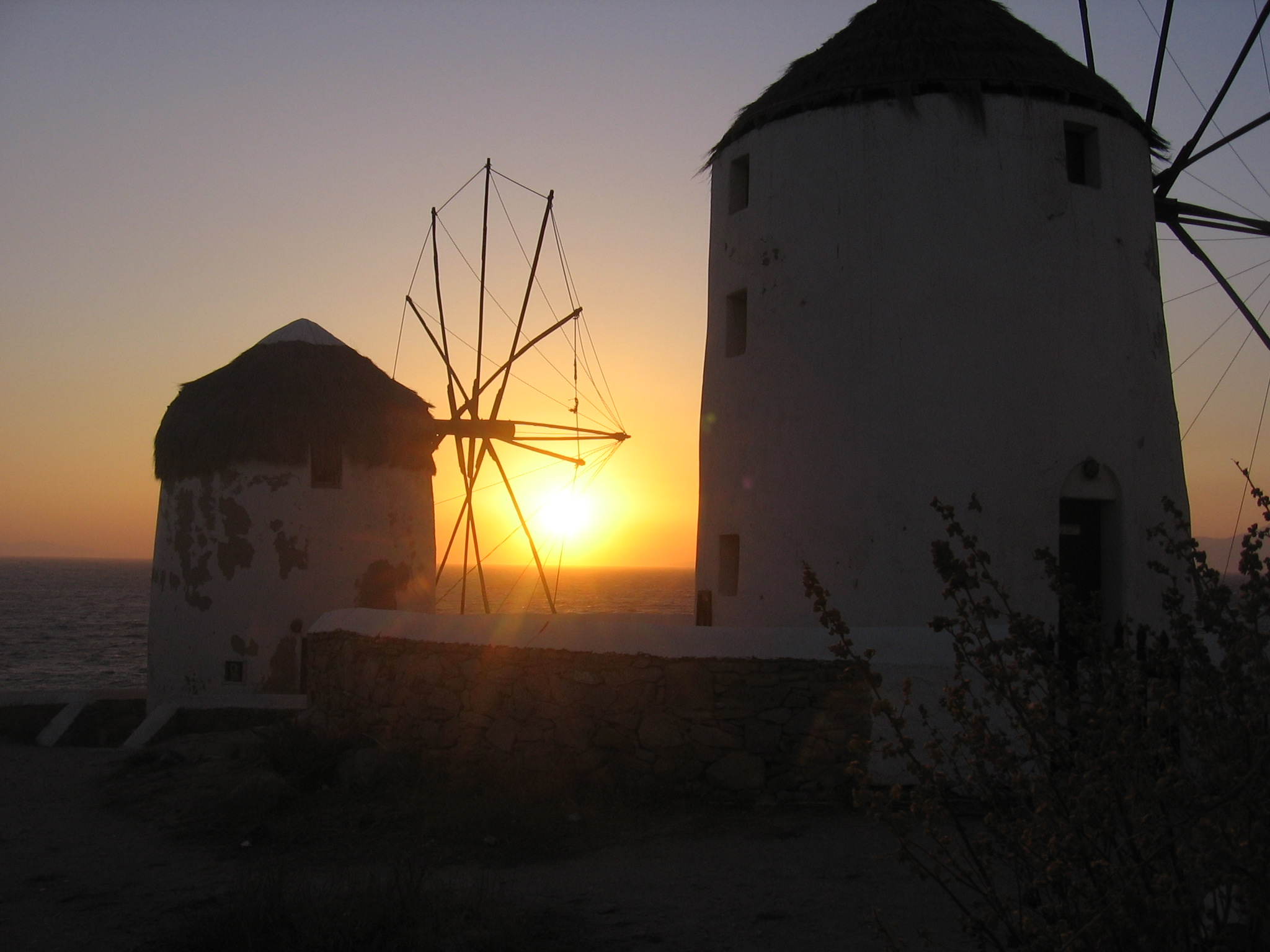
Two of the windmills at sunset

The Mykonos windmills are an iconic feature of the Greek island of the Mykonos. The island is one of the Cyclades islands, which neighbour Delos in the Aegean Sea. The windmills can be seen from every point of the village of Mykonos, the island's principal village, which is frequently called the Chora (which translates to "Country" in Greek, but refers to an island's "Town") on Greek islands. The windmills are the first thing seen when coming into the harbour of Alefkandra, as they stand on a hill overlooking the area. Most windmills face towards the North where the island's climate sources its strongest winds over the largest part of the year. There are currently 16 windmills on Mykonos of which seven are positioned on the landmark hill in Chora. Most of them were built by the Venetians in the 16th century, but their construction continued into the early 20th century. They were primarily used to mill wheat. They were an important source of income for the inhabitants. Their use gradually declined until they ceased production in the middle of the 20th century. The architecture of each of them is similar, all have a round shape, white colour and a pointed roof and very small windows. Such windmills are found in almost all Cyclades islands. One of these windmills has been transformed into a museum. The whole village of Chora and part of the harbour are visible from this point.
