= Psarrou =

Psarou
- Settlement
- A beach in Psarou

- Location within Greece
- Coordinates: 37.4158°N 25.3378°E
- Country: Greece
- Administrative region: South Aegean
- Regional unit: Mykonos
- Municipality: Mykonos
- Community: Mykonos

Population (2021)
  - Total: 106
- Time zone: UTC+2 (EET)
  - Summer (DST): UTC+3 (EEST)

Psarrou (Greek: Ψαρρού) is a beach and village on the island of Mykonos in Greece. The beach is located 4 km from Mykonos town (or Chora) and it is close to Platys Gialos. As of 2021, Psarrou had a population of 106.

== See also ==
- Cyclades
