= Rineia =

Island off Mykonos, Greece

Native name: Ρήνεια
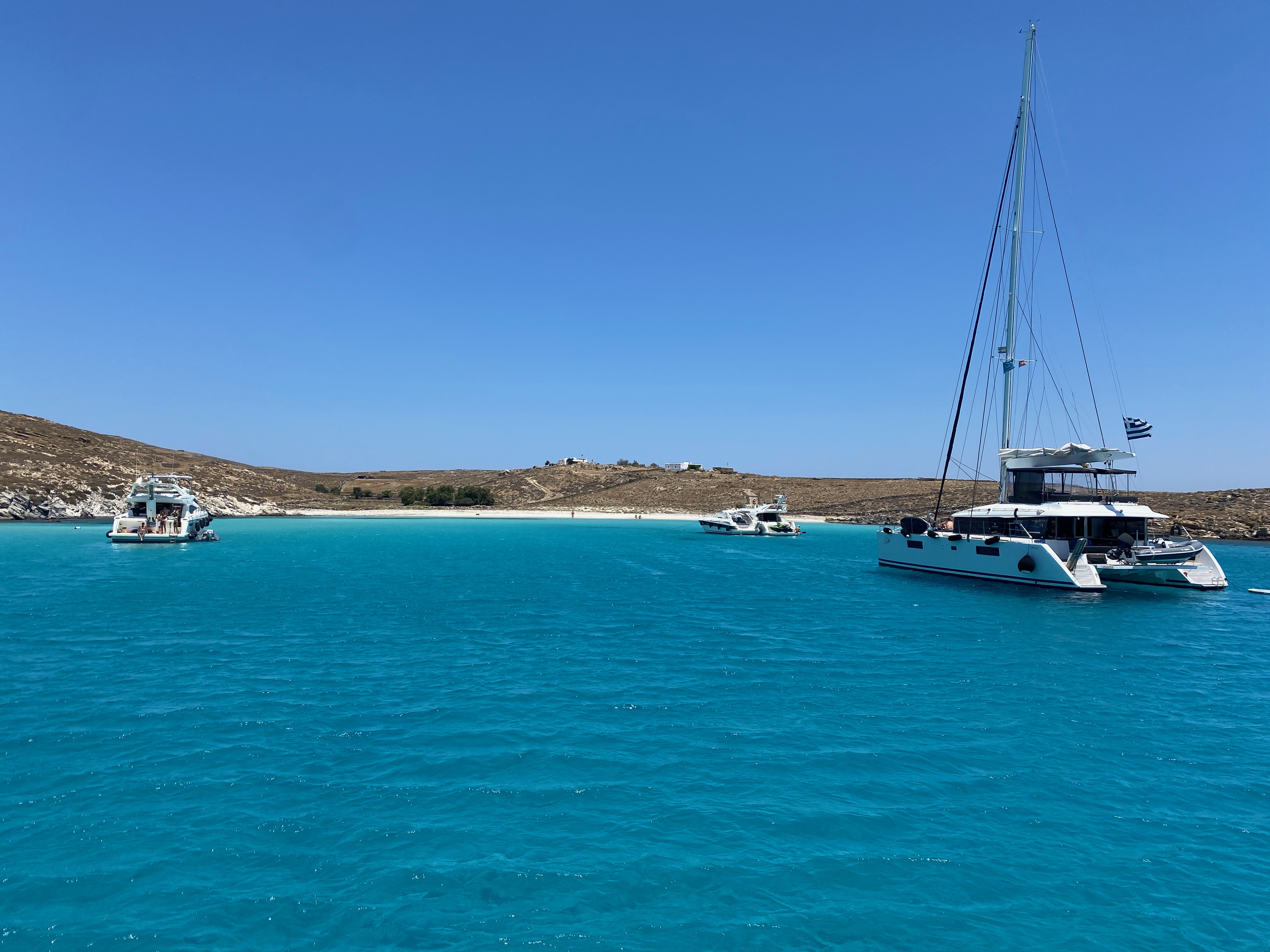
- A bay on Rineia

- Location within Greece

Geography
- Coordinates: 37.409°N 25.229°E
- Archipelago: Cyclades
- Area: 14 km^{2} (5.4 sq mi)
- Highest elevation: 136 m (446 ft)

Administration
- Greece
- Region: South Aegean
- Regional unit: Mykonos

Demographics
- Population: 0 (2001)

Additional information
- Postal code: 846 00
- Area code: 22890
- Vehicle registration: EM

Rineia, or Rhenea (Ρήνεια), is a Greek island in the Cyclades. It lies just west of the island of Delos and further southwest of the island of Mykonos, of which it and Delos are administratively a part. Its area is 14 km^{2} (5 sq mi). It had a small population until the 1980s, but is currently uninhabited.

In ancient times, the island was known as Rheneia (Ancient Greek: Ῥήνεια), Rhenaia (Ancient Greek: Ῥήναια) and Rhene (Ancient Greek: Ῥήνη), and was part of the Delian League. In the 6th century BC, it was subdued by the tyrant Polycrates of Samos and dedicated to the Delian Apollo. The southern half of Rheneia was the necropolis of Delos. In the sixth year of the Peloponnesian War (426 BCE), the Athenians "purified" Delos by removing all its tombs and prohibiting burials there. Future births and deaths on Delos were prohibited—pregnant women and people close to death were to be carried over to Rheneia. Later, the island was incorporated into the Roman Empire.

== Sources ==
- Bury, J. B. (1975). A History of Greece. Macmillan. ISBN 978-0-333-15493-9.
- Thucydides (1874) [431 BC]. Crawley, Richard (ed.). Book III . Oxford University Press.
