= Mykonos =

Greek island

Mykonos Μύκονος Nickname: Νησί των ανέμων (Nisí ton anémon, 'Island of the winds')
- Regional unit and municipality
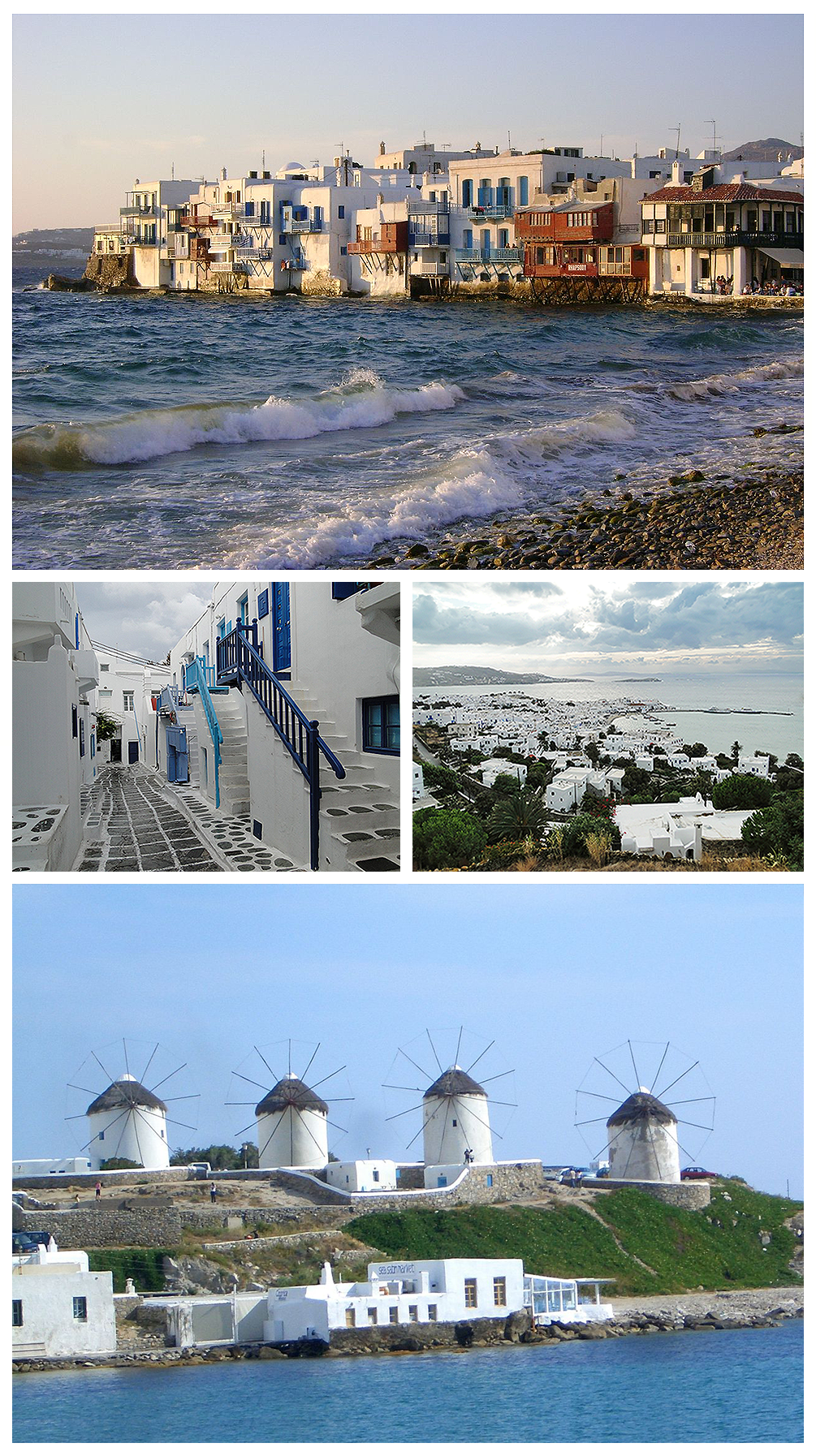
- Clockwise from top: View of Little Venice in Mykonos, panoramic view of Chora (Mykonos City), the four windmills of Mykonos and the streets of Chora

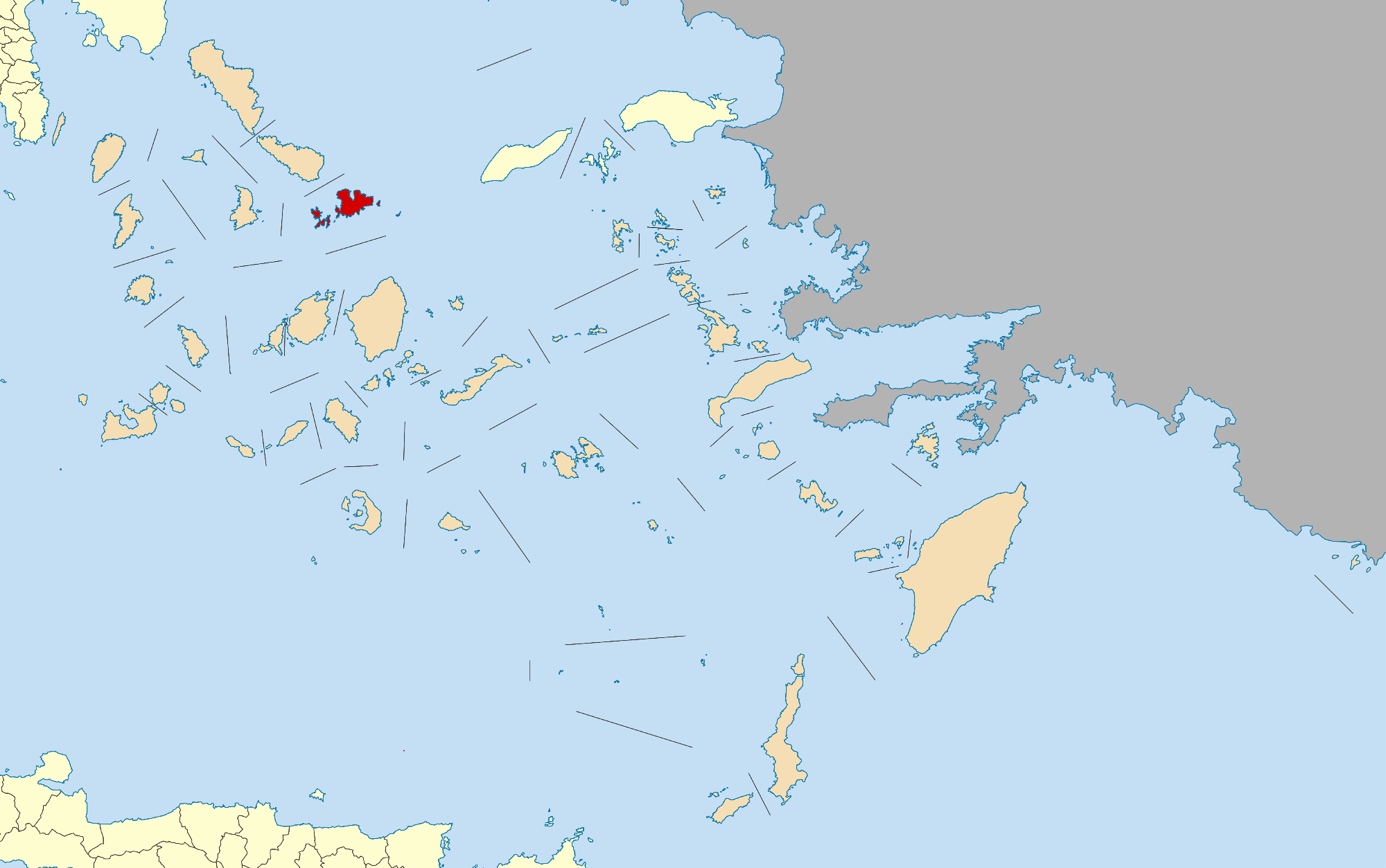
- Map of Mykonos and neighboring Rineia and Delos islands within the South Aegean

- Location within Greece
- Coordinates: 37°27′32″N 25°21′51″E
- Country: Greece
- Administrative region: South Aegean

Area
  - Municipality: 85.5 km^{2} (33.0 sq mi)

Population (2021)
  - Municipality: 10,704
  - Density: 125/km^{2} (324/sq mi)
  - Community: 8,609
- Demonym: Mykonians
- Time zone: UTC+2 (EET)
  - Summer (DST): UTC+3 (EEST)
- Postal code: 846 00
- Area code: 22890
- Website: www.mykonos.gr

Mykonos (/ˈmɪkənɒs, -noʊs/, UK also /ˈmiːk-/; Greek: Μύκονος [ˈmikonos]) is a Greek island, part of the Cyclades, lying between Tinos, Syros, Paros and Naxos. The island has an area of 85.5 square kilometres (33.0 sq mi) and rises to an elevation of 341 metres (1,119 feet) at its highest point. At the 2021 census, there were 10,704 inhabitants, most of whom lived in the largest town, Mykonos, which is on the west coast. The town is also known as Chora (i.e. 'Town' in Greek, following the common practice in Greece when the name of the island itself is the same as the name of the principal town).

Mykonos's nickname is "The Island of the Winds", due to the very strong winds that usually blow on the island. Tourism is a major industry and Mykonos is known for its vibrant nightlife.

== Name ==
There are two prevailing theories as to the origin of the name "Mykonos". The first, from Hesychius of Alexandria, surmises that the name comes from the ancient Greek "Mykon", which roughly translates to "pile of stones" or "rocky place". The second, from Stephanus of Byzantium, ties it to the mythological hero Mykonos, son of Anius.

== History ==
Herodotus mentions Carians as the original inhabitants of the island. Ionians from Athens seem to have followed next in the early 11th century BC. There were many people living on the neighboring island of Delos, the meeting ground for the Delian League, only 2 km (1.2 miles) away, which meant that Mykonos became an important place for supplies and transit. It was, however, during ancient times a rather poor island with limited agricultural resources. Its inhabitants were polytheists and worshiped many gods.

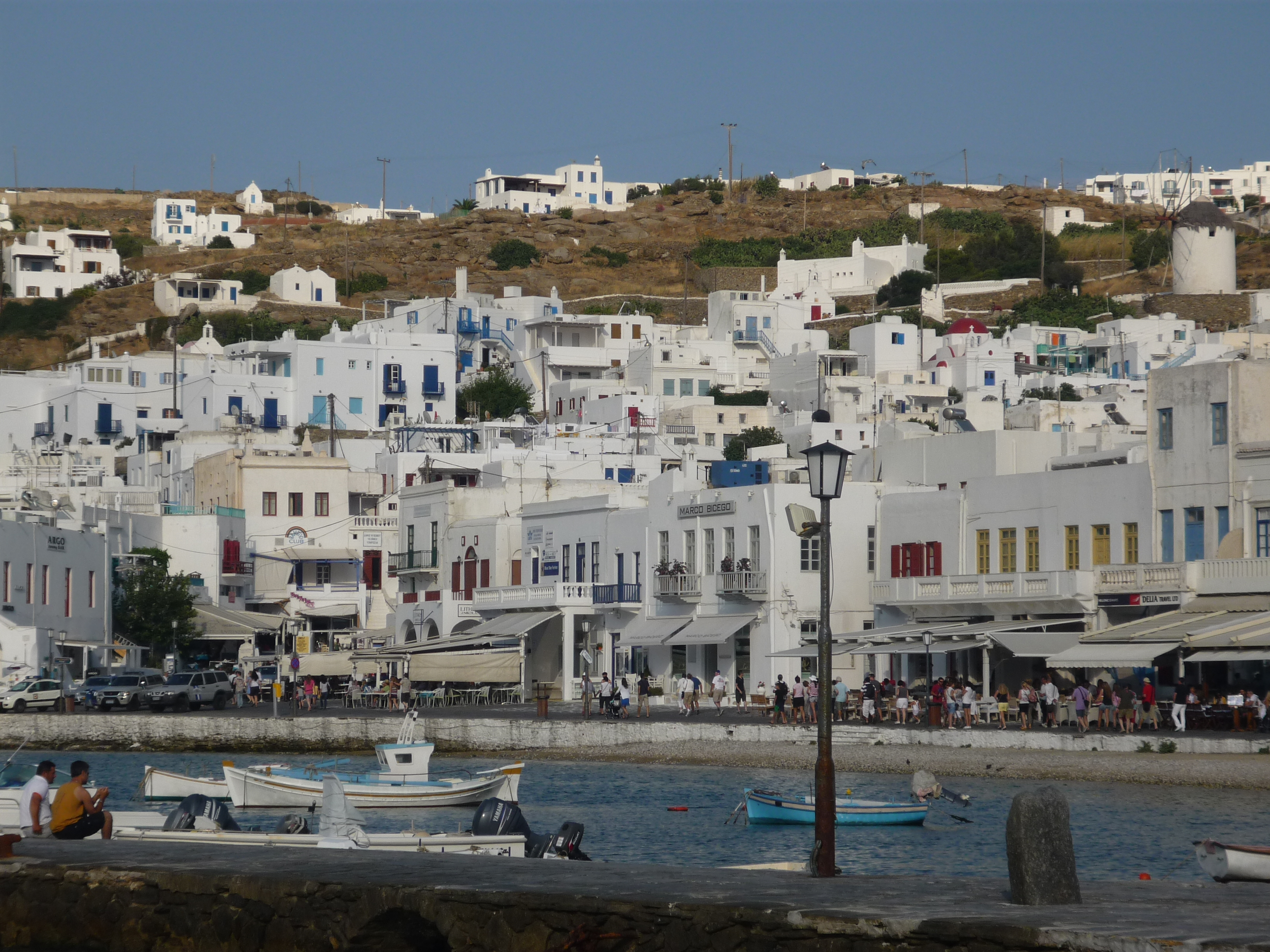
Mykonos town (Chora)

After the death of Alexander the Great, Mykonos was member of the League of the Islanders during the Hellenistic period. It came under the control of the Romans and then was part of the Byzantine Empire until the 12th century. In 1204, with the fall of Constantinople in the Fourth Crusade, Mykonos was occupied by Andrea Ghisi. The island was ravaged by the Catalans at the end of the 13th century and finally given over to direct Venetian rule in 1390.

In 1537, while the Venetians still reigned, Mykonos was attacked by Hayreddin Barbarossa, the admiral of Suleiman the Magnificent and an Ottoman fleet established itself on the island. Mykonos thus became part of the Ottoman Empire for almost three centuries, from 1537 to 1830. During this period, it was also known by the Turkish name "Mukene". The Ottomans, under the leadership of the Kapudan Pasha, imposed a system of self-governance comprising a governor and an appointed council of syndics. When the castle of neighbouring Tinos fell to the Ottomans in 1718, the last of the Venetians withdrew from the region.

Up until the end of the 18th century, Mykonos prospered as a trading center, attracting many immigrants from nearby islands, in addition to regular pirate raids. In June 1794 the Battle of Mykonos was fought between British and French ships in the island's main harbor.

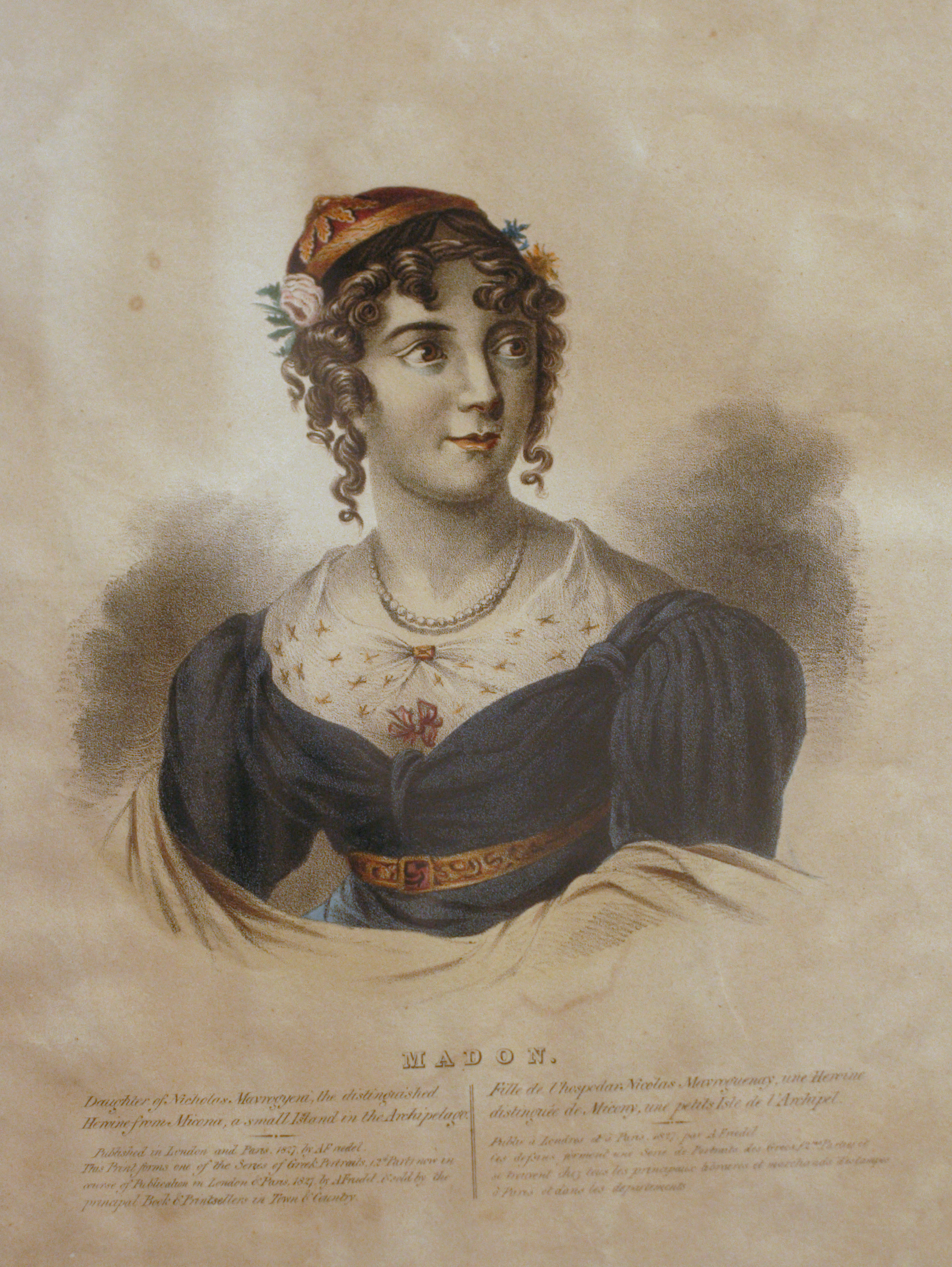
Portrait of Manto Mavrogenous at the Aegean Maritime Museum in Mykonos

The Greek Revolution against the Ottoman Empire broke out in 1821 and Mykonos played an important role, led by the national heroine, Manto Mavrogenous. Mavrogenous, a well-educated aristocrat guided by the ideas of the Enlightenment, sacrificed her family's fortune for the Greek cause. Greece became an independent state in 1830. A statue of her sits in the middle of Manto Mavrogenous square in the main town.

At the end of February 1884, the British travellers Theodore and Mabel Bent visited the island, ostensibly to witness the traditional funeral lamentations (‘mœrologia’).

As a result of sailing and merchant activity, the island's economy quickly picked up but declined again during the late 19th century and especially after the opening of the Corinth Canal in 1904 and the First World War at the beginning of the 20th century. Many Mykonians left the island to find work in mainland Greece and many foreign countries, especially the United States.

In September 1944, during the Axis occupation of Greece, the Greek Sacred Squadron carried out a commando raid against the German garrison of Mykonos. From 25 to 28 September, the operation inflicted casualties on the garrison and destroyed ammunition and food stores. The remaining German troops subsequently surrendered, and Mykonos was liberated on 30 September 1944.

Tourism soon came to dominate the local economy, owing a lot to the important excavations carried out by the French School of Archaeology, which began work in Delos in 1873. Mykonos became popular with international "jet set" tourists in the 1960s. In the 1970s, it was popular spot for Americans to treat as a nude beach, which Americans imagined to be a feature of those natural "far out" Greeks, and then flourished further to become a popular gay tourist destination in the 1980s. By the 2000s, Mykonos had become one of Greece's most expensive islands. Mykonos is one of the most popular tourist destinations in Greece, widely known for its beaches, nightlife, and traditional Cycladic architecture.

=== Mythology ===
In Greek mythology, Mykonos was named after its first ruler, Mykonos (Μύκονος), the son of the hero Anius and grandson of the god Apollo. The island is also said to have been the location of the Gigantomachy, the great battle between Zeus and Giants and where Heracles killed the invincible giants having lured them from the protection of Mount Olympus. According to myth, the large rocks all over the island are said to be the petrified corpses of the giants.

== Geography ==
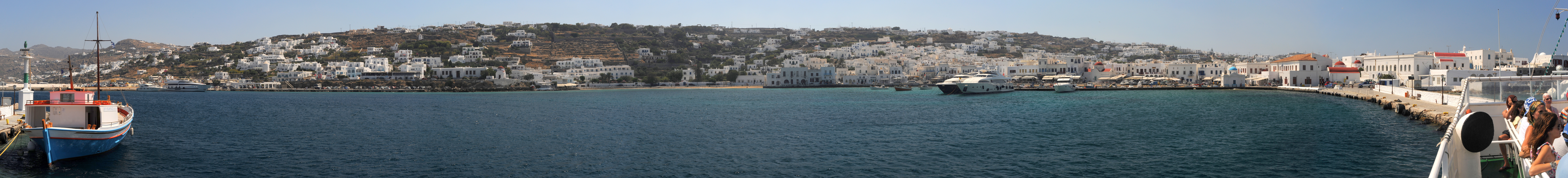
Panoramic view of Chora port

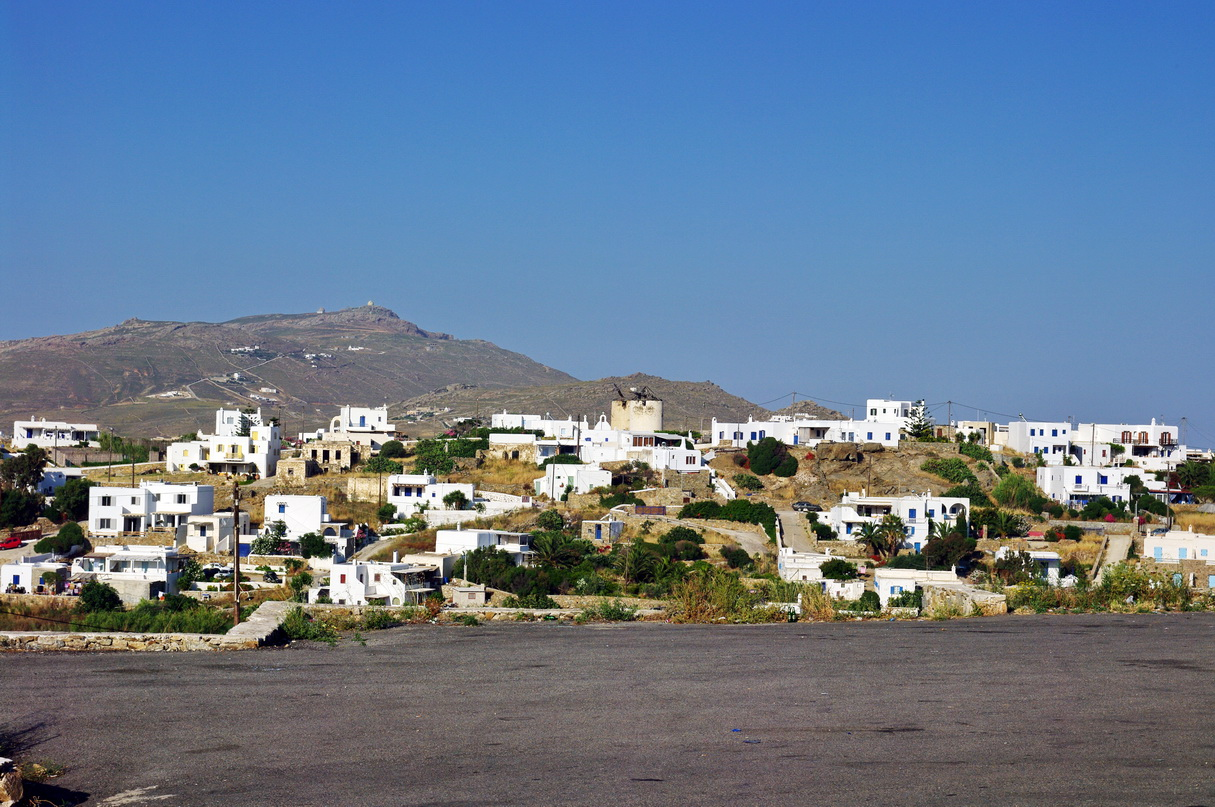
Village of Ano Mera

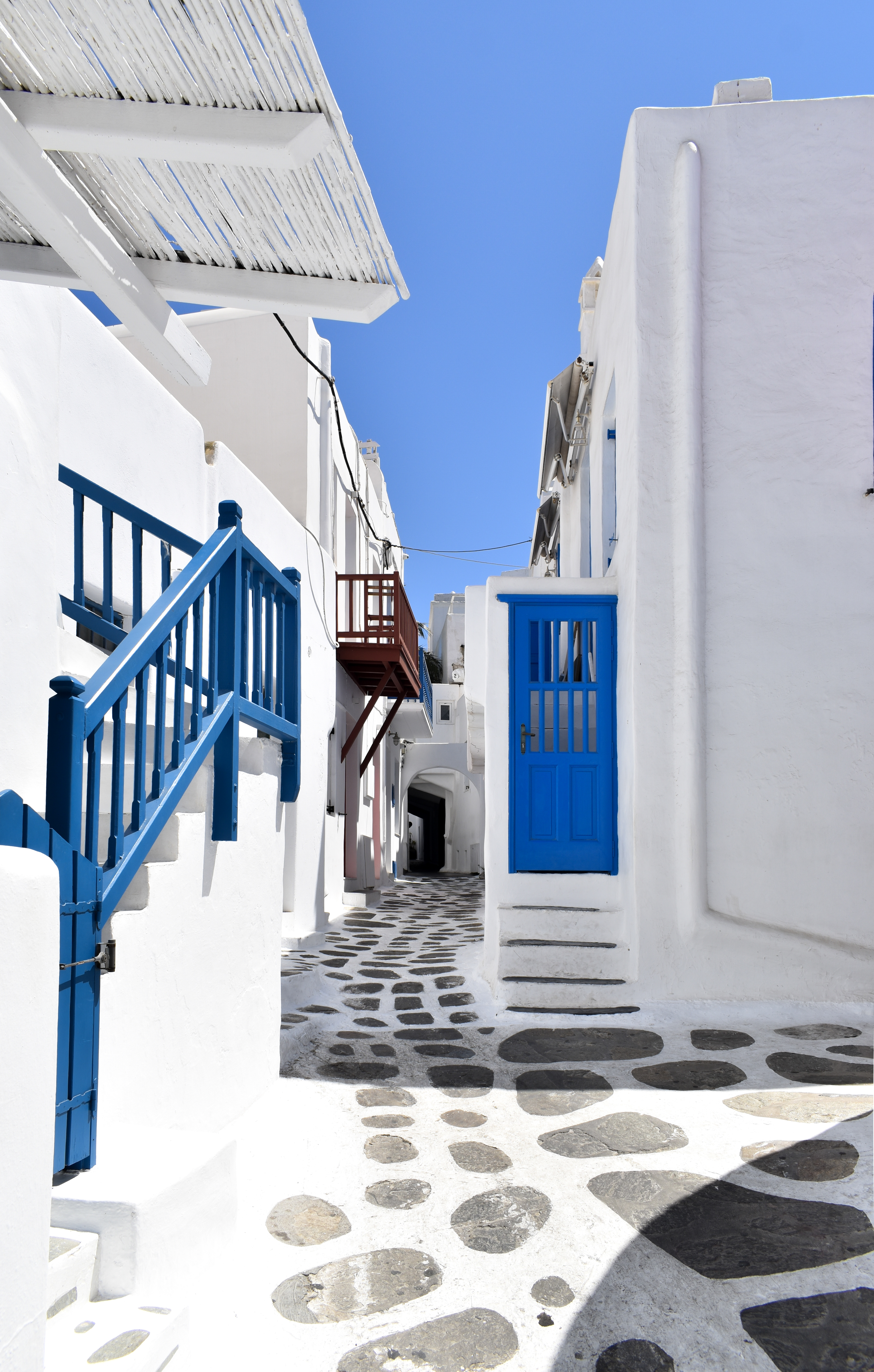
Houses of Chora

The island has an area of 85.5 square kilometres (33.0 sq mi) and rises to an elevation of 341 metres (1,119 feet) at its highest point. It is situated 150 kilometres (93 miles) east of Athens in the Aegean Sea. The island features no rivers but has numerous seasonal streams, two of which have been converted into reservoirs.

The island is composed mostly of granite and the terrain is very rocky with many areas eroded by the strong winds. High quality clay and baryte, which is a mineral used as a lubricant in oil drilling, were mined on the eastern side of Mykonos until the late 1900s.

It produces 4,500 cubic metres (160,000 cu ft) of water daily, by reverse osmosis of sea water in order to help meet the needs of its population and visitors.

The island has a population of nearly 12,500, most of whom live in the main town of Chora.

=== Climate ===
According to the National Observatory of Athens, Mykonos has a hot semi-arid climate (Köppen climate classification: BSh) because of the low overall precipitation, although it has lots of Mediterranean climate (Csa) characteristics and is highly influenced by the Aegean Sea. The rainy season lasts from October until March. Vegetation follows the typical pattern for the region and grows around mid-autumn and ends in the beginning of the summer. The average daily high temperature in the winter is around 15 °C (59 °F), while it is around 27.0 °C (80.6 °F) in the summer. The average nighttime temperature is 11 °C (52 °F) in the winter and over 24 °C (75 °F) in the summer.

Because of the seasonal cool "meltemi" wind (similar to the other Cyclades islands) and the moderating sea, summer days are relatively cool, dry, sunny and pleasant. The reason for the low overall rainfall is the rain shadow of the Pindus mountain range, which dry out the westerly winds. Winters in general are mild and wet, with many sunny days even in mid-winter. Coastal Mykonos falls in 10b/11a hardiness zone.

Climate data for Mykonos (10 m a.s.l.) Climate: Hot semi-arid climate (BSh) • USDA: 10b (4.25°C)
Month	Jan	Feb	Mar	Apr	May	Jun	Jul	Aug	Sep	Oct	Nov	Dec	Year
Record high °C (°F)	22.3 (72.1)	22.2 (72.0)	23.3 (73.9)	27.8 (82.0)	32.5 (90.5)	37.8 (100.0)	37.8 (100.0)	36.4 (97.5)	34.9 (94.8)	30.8 (87.4)	28.2 (82.8)	24.2 (75.6)	37.8 (100.0)
Mean daily maximum °C (°F)	14.6 (58.3)	15.0 (59.0)	16.1 (61.0)	18.8 (65.8)	22.6 (72.7)	26.3 (79.3)	27.8 (82.0)	27.6 (81.7)	25.7 (78.3)	22.0 (71.6)	19.2 (66.6)	16.1 (61.0)	21.0 (69.8)
Daily mean °C (°F)	12.8 (55.0)	13.2 (55.8)	14.2 (57.6)	16.8 (62.2)	20.3 (68.5)	24.1 (75.4)	26.0 (78.8)	26.0 (78.8)	24.0 (75.2)	20.4 (68.7)	17.6 (63.7)	14.3 (57.7)	19.1 (66.5)
Mean daily minimum °C (°F)	11.0 (51.8)	11.3 (52.3)	12.3 (54.1)	14.7 (58.5)	18.0 (64.4)	21.8 (71.2)	24.3 (75.7)	24.4 (75.9)	22.3 (72.1)	18.9 (66.0)	15.9 (60.6)	12.5 (54.5)	17.3 (63.1)
Record low °C (°F)	1.4 (34.5)	2.8 (37.0)	2.2 (36.0)	9.1 (48.4)	12.2 (54.0)	16.8 (62.2)	21.1 (70.0)	19.3 (66.7)	15.3 (59.5)	11.2 (52.2)	9.3 (48.7)	2.9 (37.2)	1.4 (34.5)
Average rainfall mm (inches)	66.1 (2.60)	58.0 (2.28)	34.3 (1.35)	18.7 (0.74)	5.9 (0.23)	3.6 (0.14)	0.1 (0.00)	1.3 (0.05)	10.4 (0.41)	24.3 (0.96)	34.4 (1.35)	55.0 (2.17)	312.1 (12.28)
Source: National Observatory of Athens Monthly Bulletins (Jul 2008-May 2026)

=== Villages ===
There are ten villages:

- Agios Ioannis
- Agios Stefanos
- Ano Mera
- Ftelia
- Kalafati
- Mykonos or Chora
- Ornos
- Platys Gialos
- Psarrou
- Tourlos

== Cuisine ==
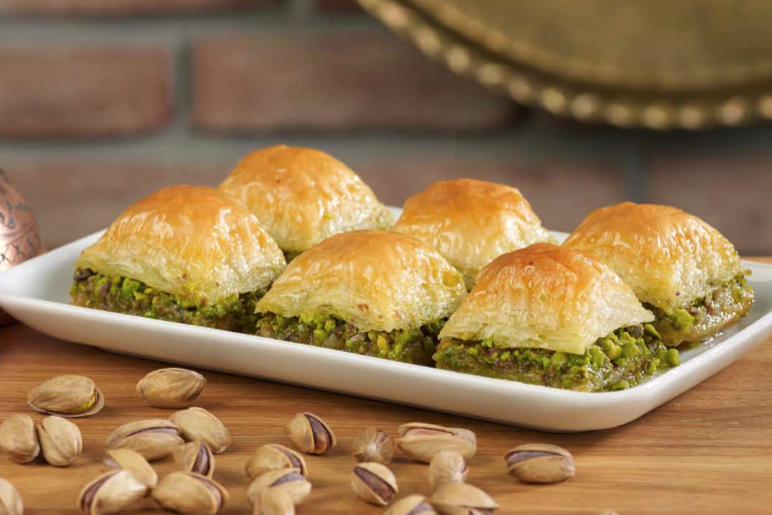
Baklava Mykonos

Local specialities:

- Kopanisti Mykonou (cheese)
- Kremmydopita
- Louza (similar to the Cypriot lountza)
- Omeletta
- Amygdalota (dessert)
- Lazarakia (dessert)
- Melopita (dessert)
- Ksinotira (appetizer)
- Baklava (dessert)

== Government ==
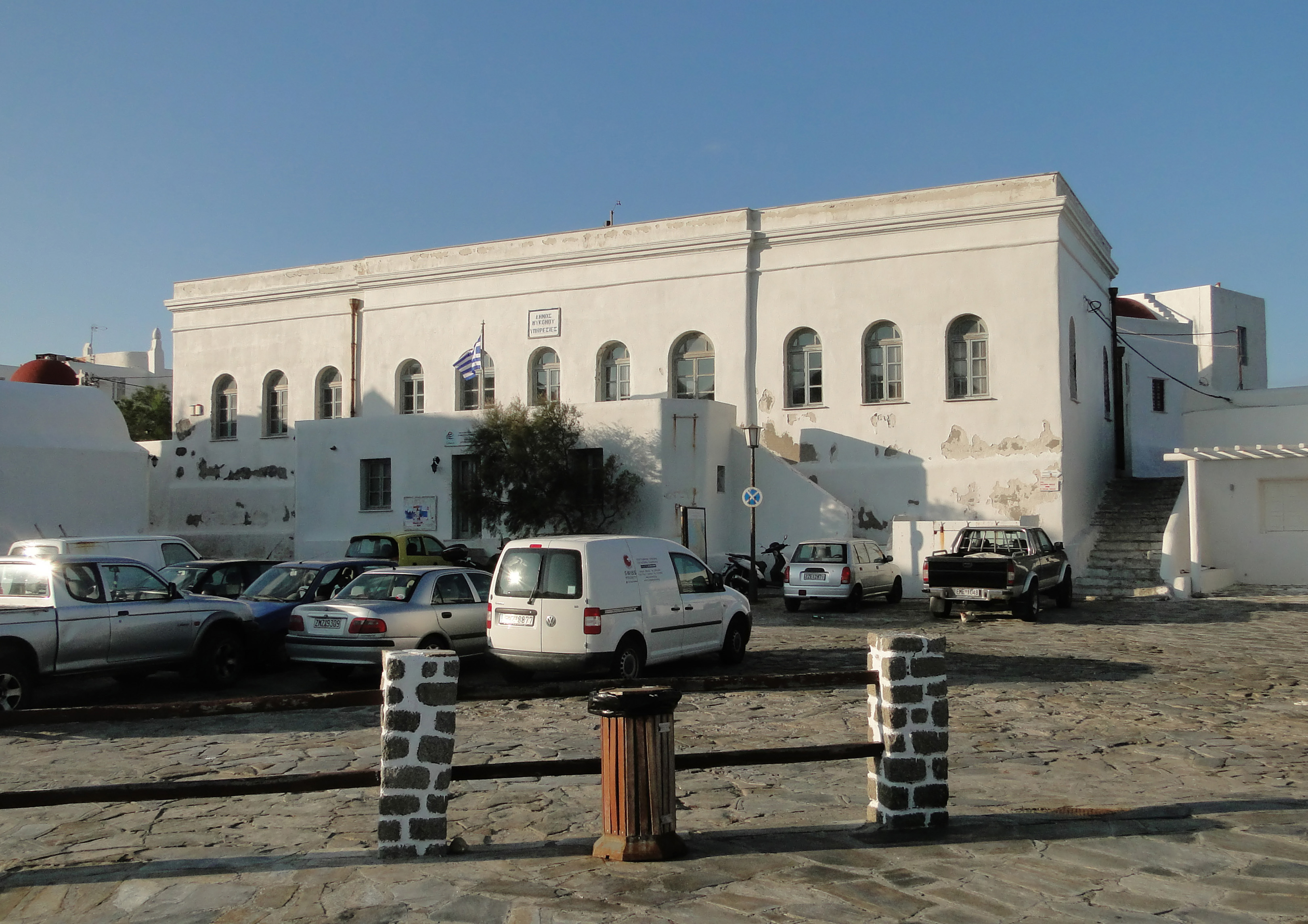
The town hall annex (Town Hall is to its left.)

The municipality of Mykonos (officially: Greek: Δήμος Μυκόνου) is a separate regional unit of the South Aegean region, and the sole municipality in the regional unit. As a part of the 2011 Kallikratis government reform, the regional unit Mykonos was created out of part of the former Cyclades Prefecture. The municipality, unchanged at the Kallikratis reform, also includes the islands of Delos, Rineia and several uninhabited islets. The total area of the municipality is 105.183 km^{2} (40.611 sq mi).

The mayors of Mykonos have been:

- Fragiskos Nazos (Φραγκίσκος Νάζος; 1975–1978)
- Matthaios Apostolou (Ματθαίος Αποστόλου; 1979–1990)
- Christos Veronis (Χρήστος Βερώνης; 1991–2010)
- Athnanasios Kousathanas-Megas (Αθανάσιος Κουσαθάνας-Μέγας; 2011–2014)
- Konstantinos Koukas (Κωνσταντίνος Κουκάς; 2014–2023)
- Christos Veronis (Χρήστος Βερώνης; 2024–present)

== Demographics ==
Year	Municipality population
1971	3,863
1981	5,530
1991	6,179
2001	9,320
2011	10,134
2021	10,704

== Economy ==
Mykonos is the second top summer destination in Greece, and is known as an upscale nightlife and party destination during summer. It is estimated to have at least 1.5 million visitors per annum, with capacity to hold approximately 50,000 visitors per night.

Due to its upscale nightlife, more luxury hotels and resorts are opening on the island.

== Landmarks ==
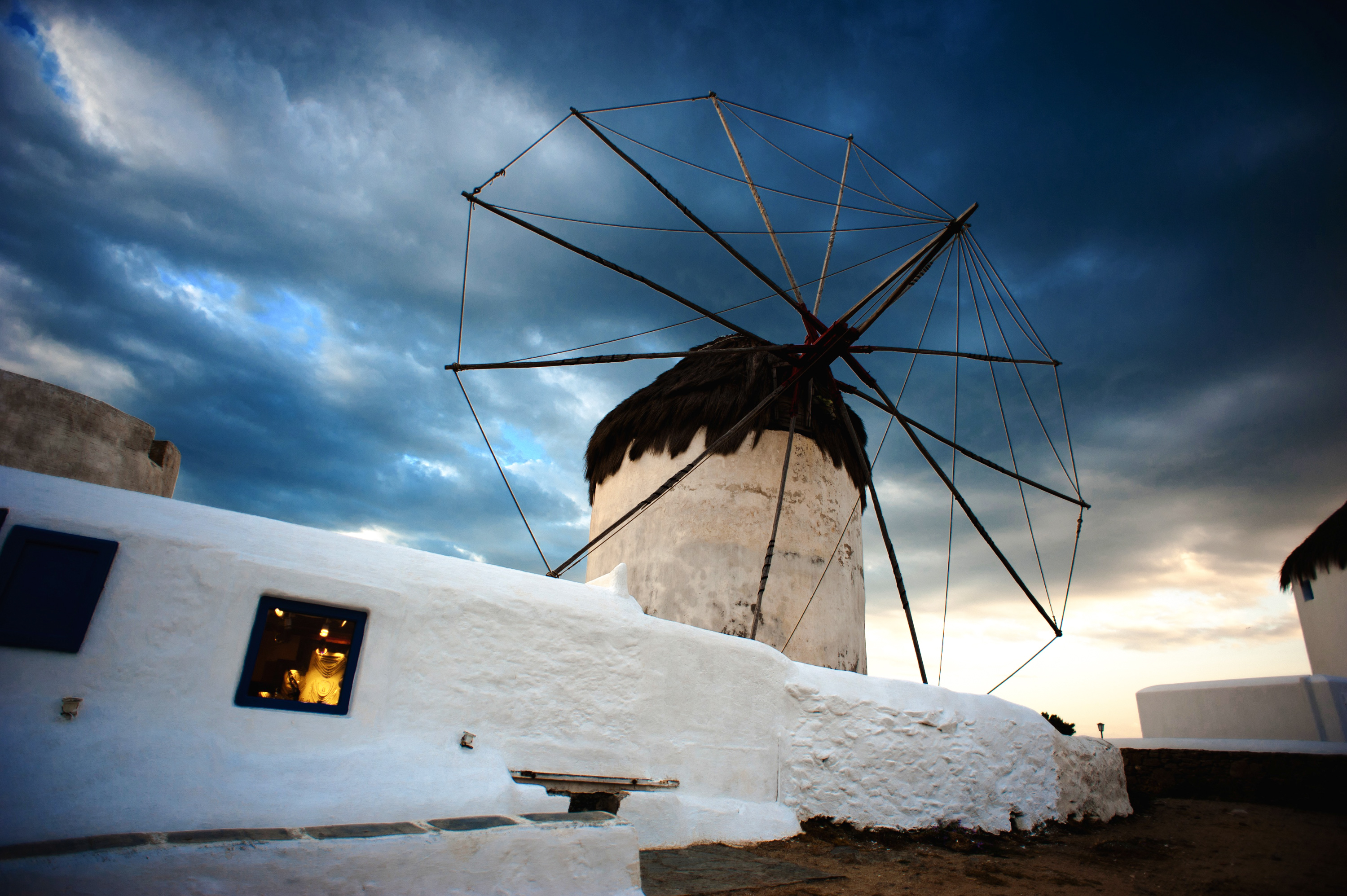
Against Greek skies, one of the Mykonos Island Windmills, Chora. Cyclades, Aegean Sea, Greece.

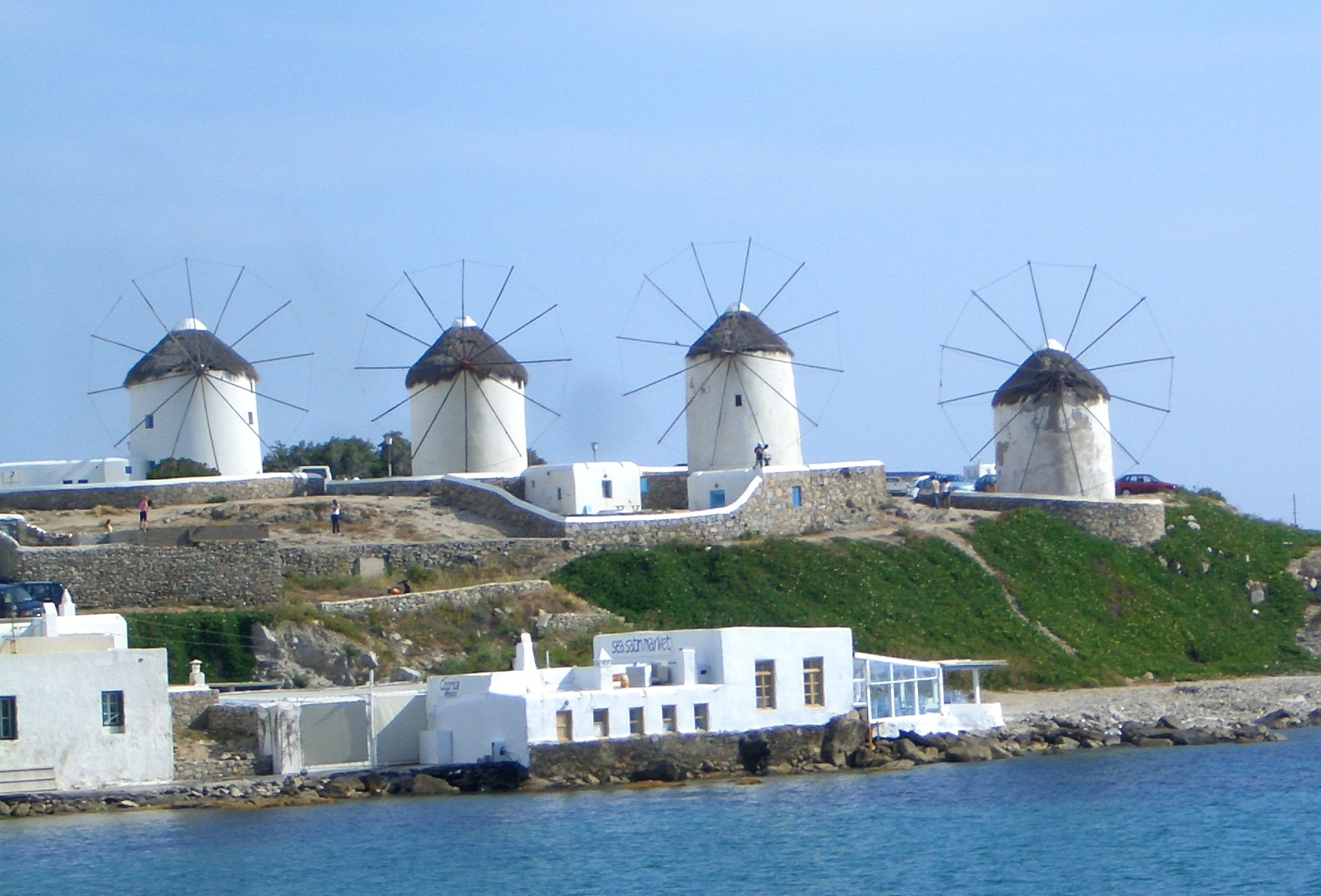
Chora or lower windmills

- Municipal Library – an 18th-century mansion housing over 8,000 volumes and a vast collection of 18th- and 19th-century photographs, documents and Cycladic coins and old seals as well as sketches and books from the personal library of American artist John Ratekin. The Municipal Library is located on Ayia Kyriaki Square in the main town of Chora.
- Petros the Pelican – an old celebrity of the town's waterfront, "Petros" has been the official mascot of Mykonos for over 60 years. He took up permanent residence on the island after a storm in 1954 and after his death the islanders elected a successor to carry on his legacy until today.
- Mykonos windmills – The windmills are a defining feature of the Mykonian landscape. There are many dotted around the island, but most are concentrated in the main town of Chora. The famous "Kato Mili" in Chora (Greek for lower mills), stand in a row on a hill overlooking the sea to harness the strong northern winds. Capped with wood and straw, the windmills were built by the Venetians in the 16th century to mill flour and remained in use until the early 20th century. Many have been refurbished and restored to serve as homes to locals and vaults to numerous Mykonian heritage documents.

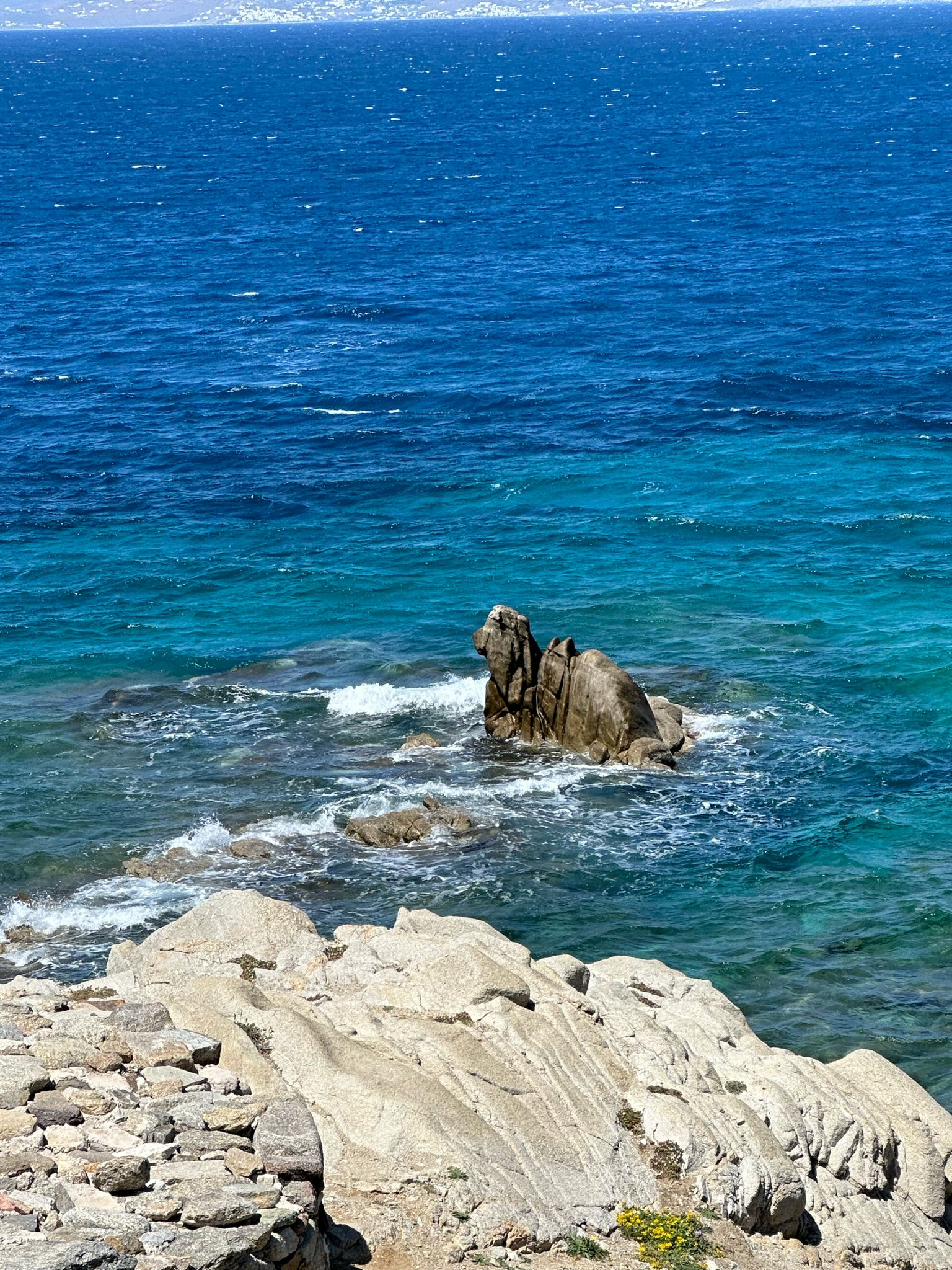
Camel Rock off the coast of Mykonos

- Camel Rock – a rock formation off the coast and near the windmills at "Kato Mili". It derives its name from its appearance which resembles a camel sitting in the shallow blue and green water.

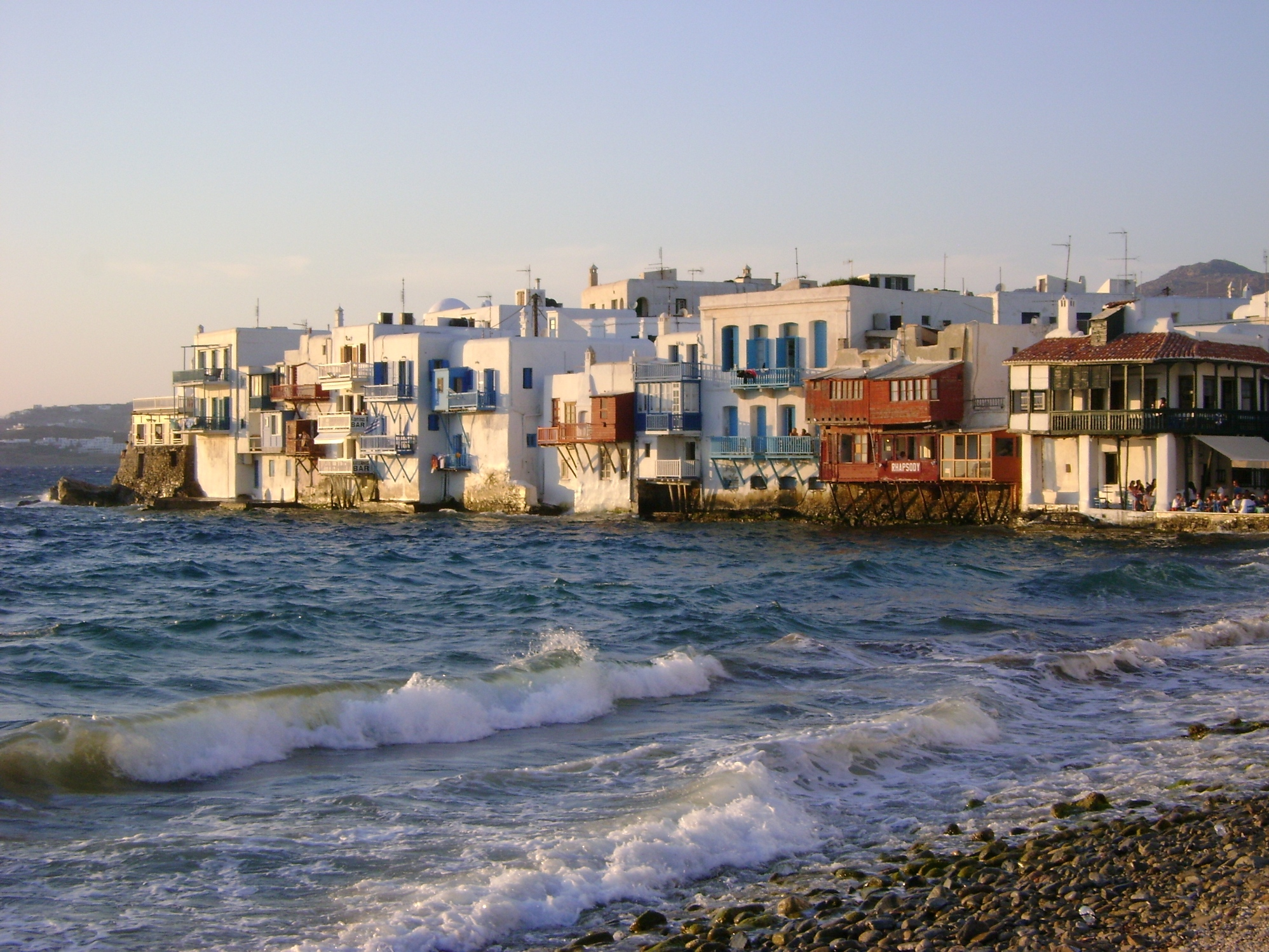
Mikri Venetia (Little Venice)

- Little Venice – rows of fishing houses line the waterfront with their balconies hanging over the sea. The first of these was constructed in the mid-18th century. They originally belonged to rich merchants or captains and the little basement doors that provided direct access to the sea and underground storage areas led people to believe that the owners were secretly pirates. Some of the houses have now been converted into bars and cafes and little shops and galleries. Little Venice is considered one of the most romantic spots on the island and many people gather there to watch the sunset. The area attracts many artists who come to paint the picturesque coastline.

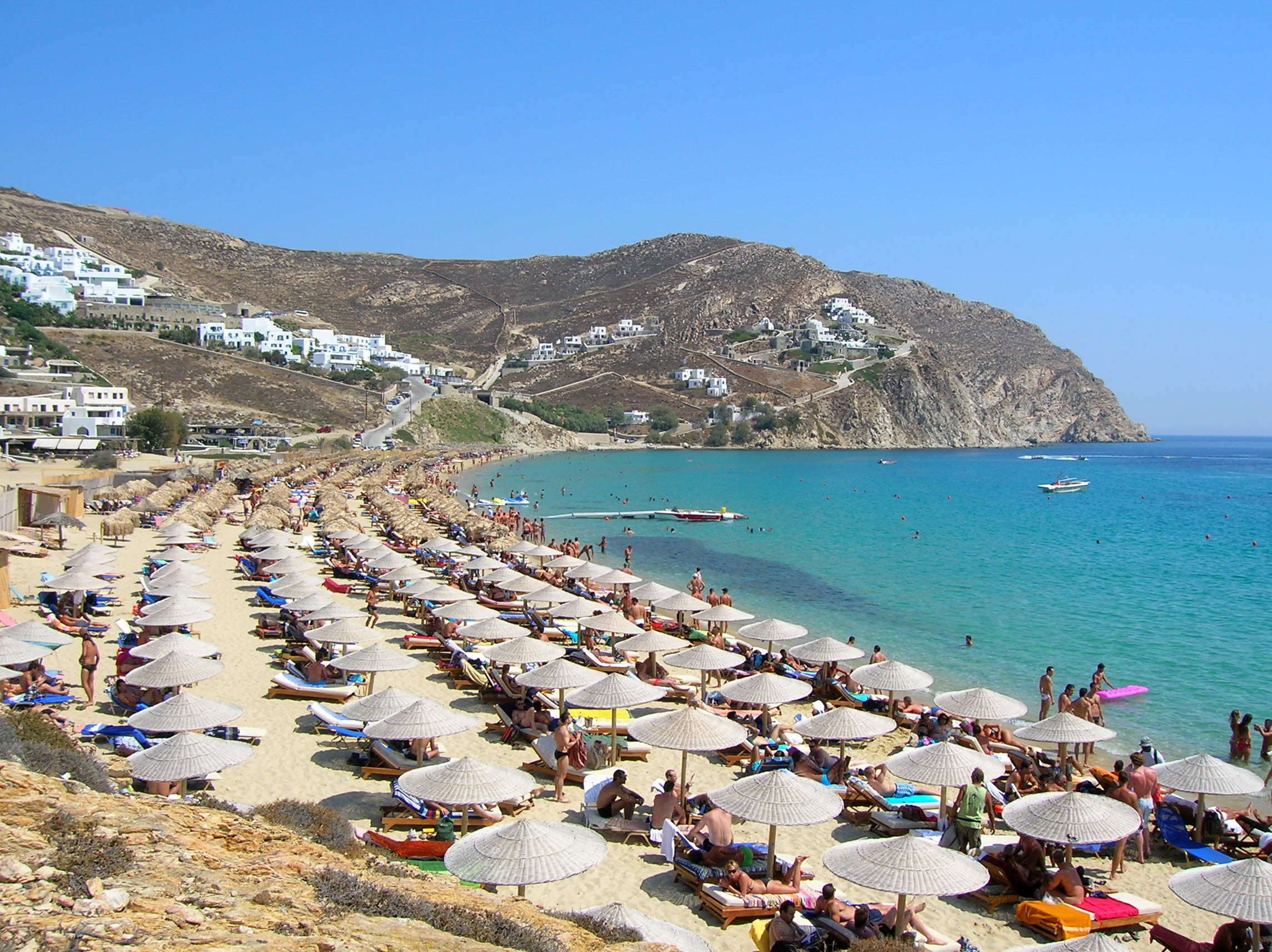
Elia Beach

- Armenistis Lighthouse – is a testimony to Mykonos' maritime history, as well as a fully functioning lighthouse. It is located in Fanari, which means lantern in Greek, 6.5 km (4.0 mi) from Chora.
- Tria Pigadia – are three identical wells standing in a row in the middle of the main town, Chora. They were built in 1722 to provide the town with water. Unlike most modern wells which are over 30 metres (98 ft) deep, the Tria Pigadia are only 5–6 metres (16–20 ft) deep as they were dug into sand where water was more easily accessible.
- Archaeological Museum of Mykonos – was built in 1905 to house the findings from the Purification Pit of 425/426 BC, discovered in 1898 on the islet of Rheneia by D. Stavropoulos. It is one of the oldest museums in Greece and was designed by Alexandros Lykakis and funded by the Ministry of Education and the Archaeological Society of Athens. The land as donated by the Municipality of Mykonos.

The original Neoclassical building underwent refurbishments and expansions in the 1930s and 1960s and the large eastern room was added in 1972. The museum contains artefacts from the neighbouring island Rhenia, including 9th- to 8th-century BC ceramic pottery from the Cyclades and 7th- to 6th-century BC works from other areas in the Aegean. Its most famous item is the large vase produced in Tinos, showing scenes from the fall of Troy.

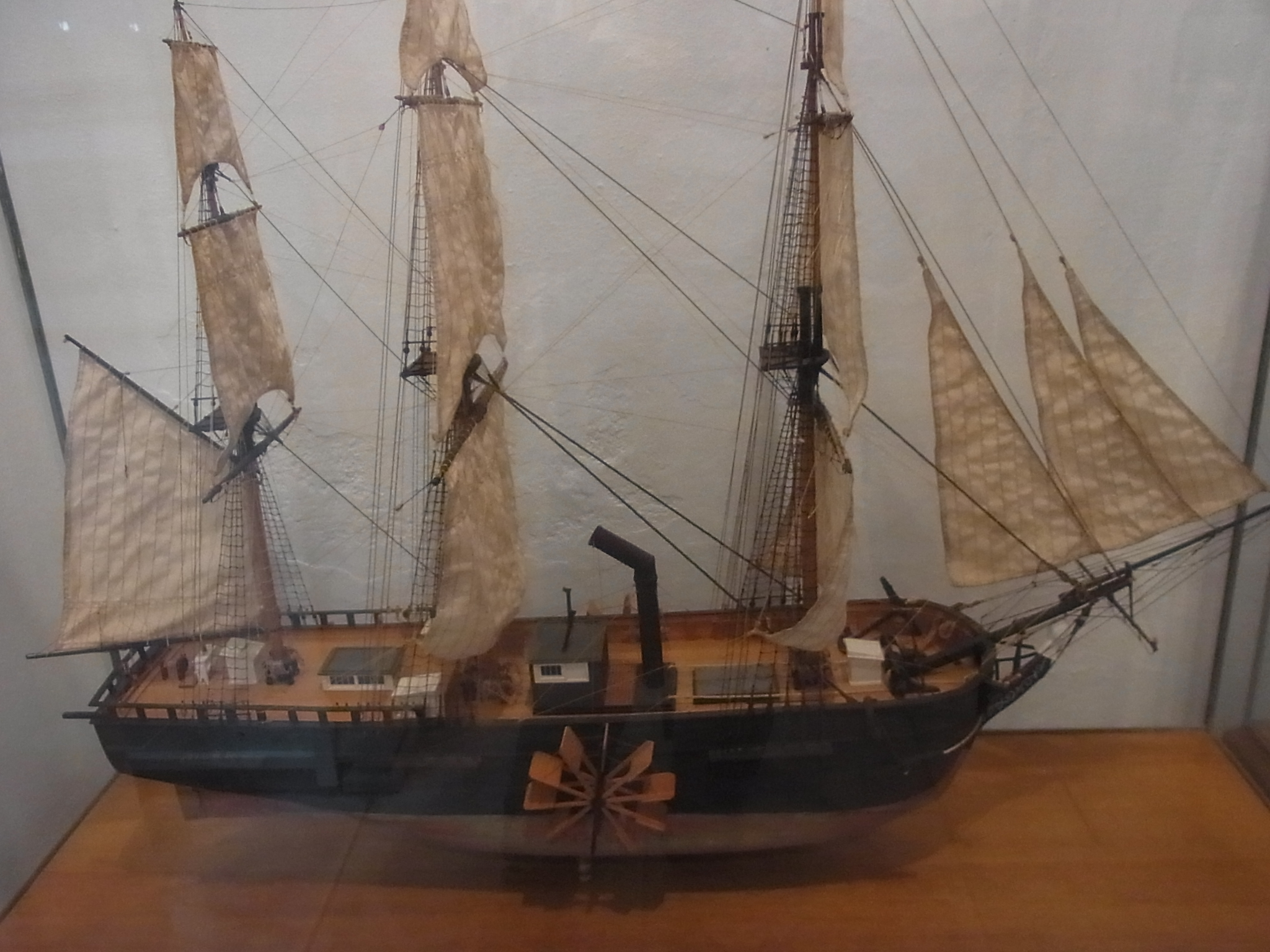
Aegean Maritime Museum exhibit

- Aegean Maritime Museum – was founded in 1983 by the Mykonian George M. Drakopoulos and it opened in 1985 with the goal of preserving and promoting the study of Greek maritime history and tradition, in particular the evolution and activities of the merchant ship in the Aegean Sea. Drakopoulos has been awarded with the Athens Academy Award and with the World Ship Trust's award for Individual Achievement for his work with the museum. The museum was the first in Greece that rescued and restored living historical exhibits to operate as they were originally designed and built. In addition to original pieces, there are also replicas of historical ships and collections of coins with nautical scenes from the 5th century BC to the 4th century AD and a variety of elaborate shipping instruments.
- Folklore Museum – the oldest house on the island houses a collection of 19th-century furniture, jewellery, ceramics embroideries, marble sculptures, tombstones and a variety of other trinkets. The museum also pays tribute to Mykonos' traditional nautical roots with models of 19th-century Mykonian ships, maps and an anchor and canons used during the Greek War of Independence.
- Lena's House – this 19th-century traditional Mykonian residence belonged to a wealthy shipping family and the original furniture is still preserved. The house now operates as a museum.
- Agricultural Museum (also known as the Bonis Mill) – old tools and machinery are displayed in one of Mykonos' windmills and, located above the main town of Chora in Ano Myloi (meaning Upper Windmills), it offers views of the area.

=== Churches ===
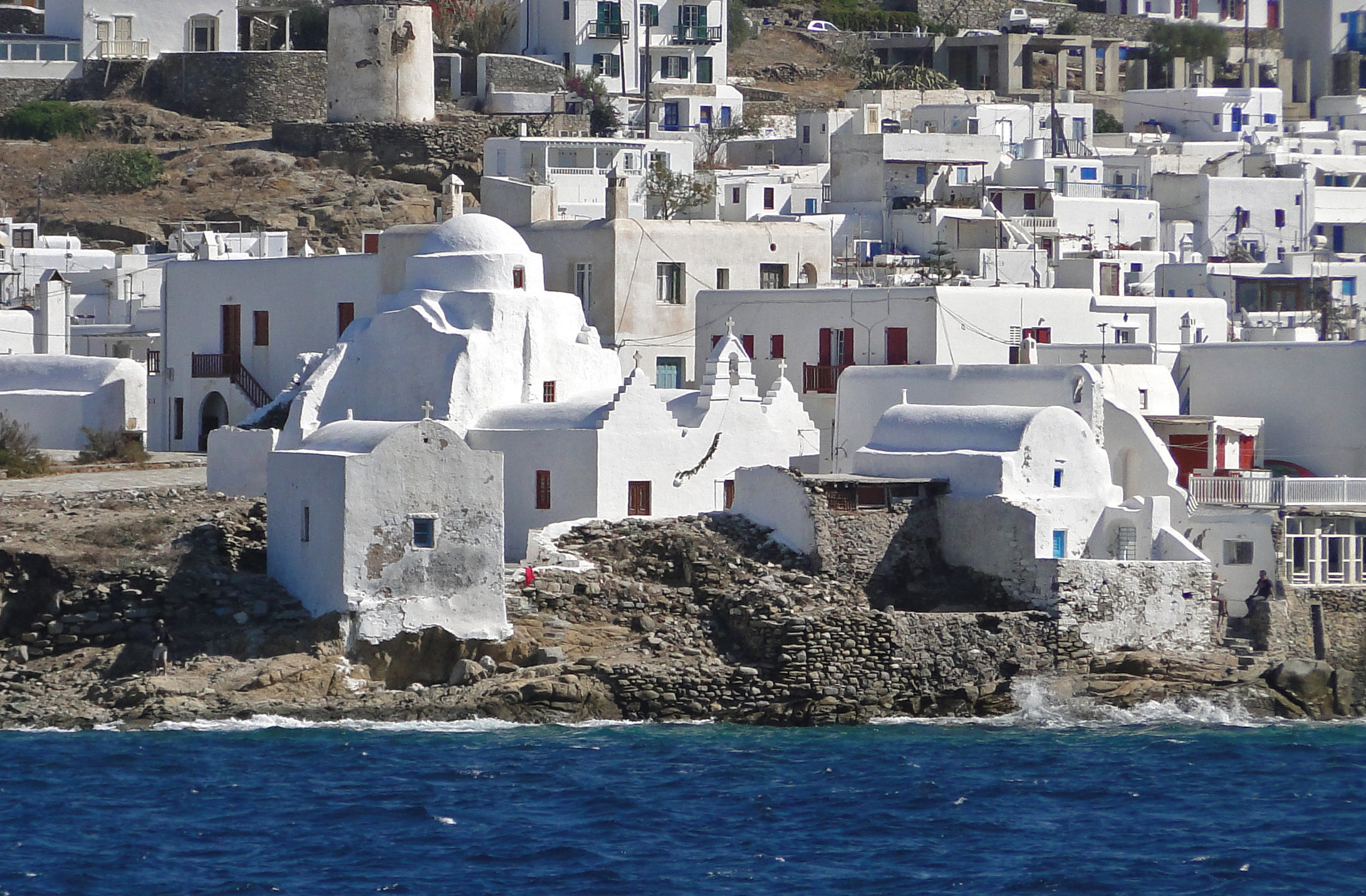
Church of Paraportiani

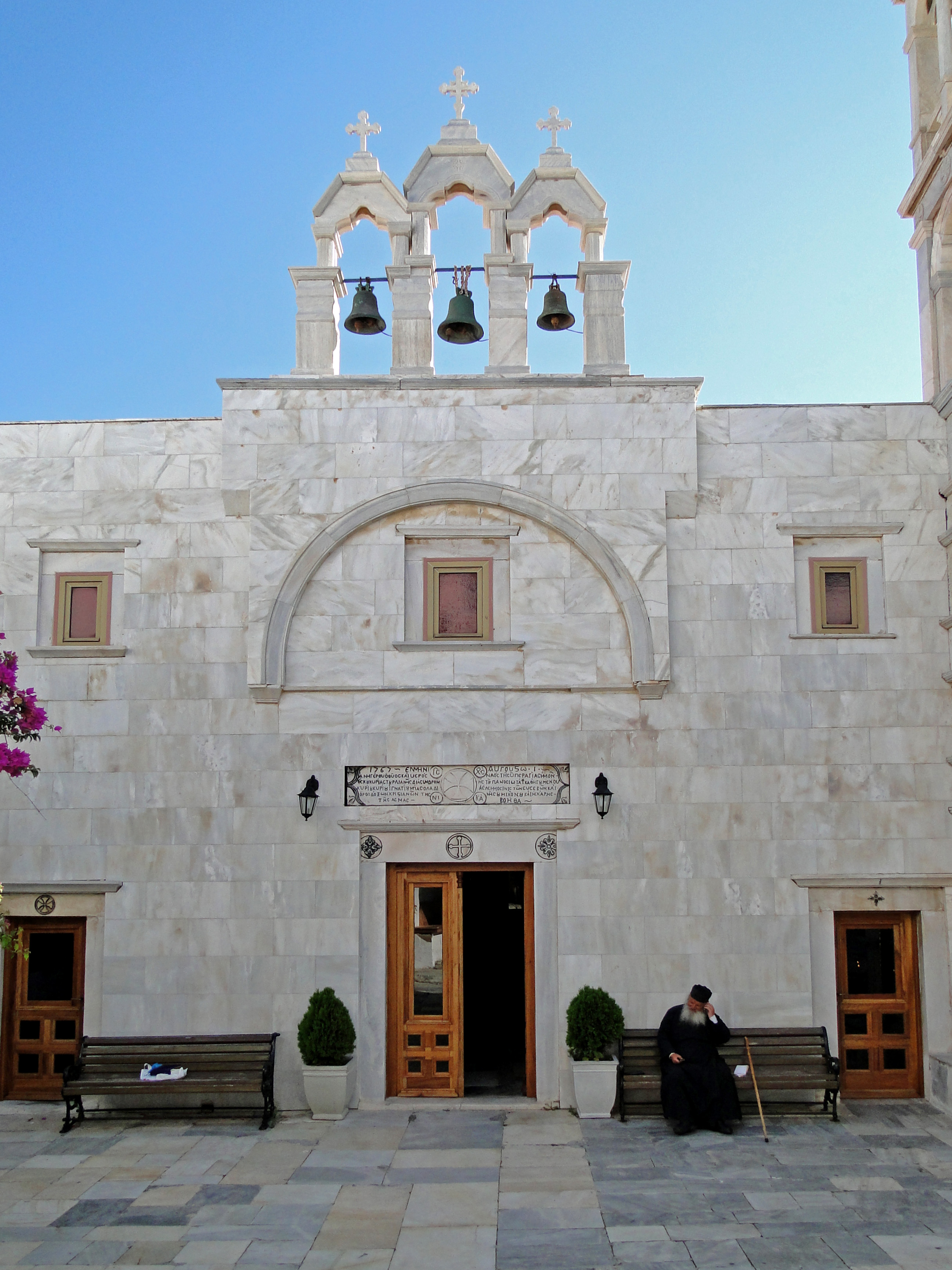
Monastery in Ano Mera

There is an abundance of churches because, for many years, the islanders were required to build a church on their land before building a house.

- Panagia Paraportiani – (the Church of Our Lady) one of the most famous architectural structures in Greece. The church received its name Paraportiani, which means "standing next to the entrance / door", because it was located next to the entrance of the ancient castle, or kastro door. The neighbourhood of Kastro, where it is situated, used to be the site of a medieval castle – in those days a castle was a strong fortification surrounding a settlement – constructed in 1207 by the Ghisi family, who controlled the island at the time. The castle was destroyed in the 16th century and its remnants covered up by new buildings when Chora began to expand in the 18th century. It took around 200 years to build the church. Construction began in the 15th century and was not completed until the 17th century. Its architectural quirkiness makes it one of the most photographed places in the world.
- Our Lady of the Holy Rosary – the only Catholic church on the island was constructed in 1668 and renovated in 1677 by Bishop Leandros Zanthakis. The icon of the Virgin Mary and baby Jesus between Saint Dominic and Saint Catherine of Siena was transported to Mykonos from Venice in 1715. A fire on 1 May 1991 damaged part of the church. By October 1997, the church was restored and reopened to the public.

== Transportation ==
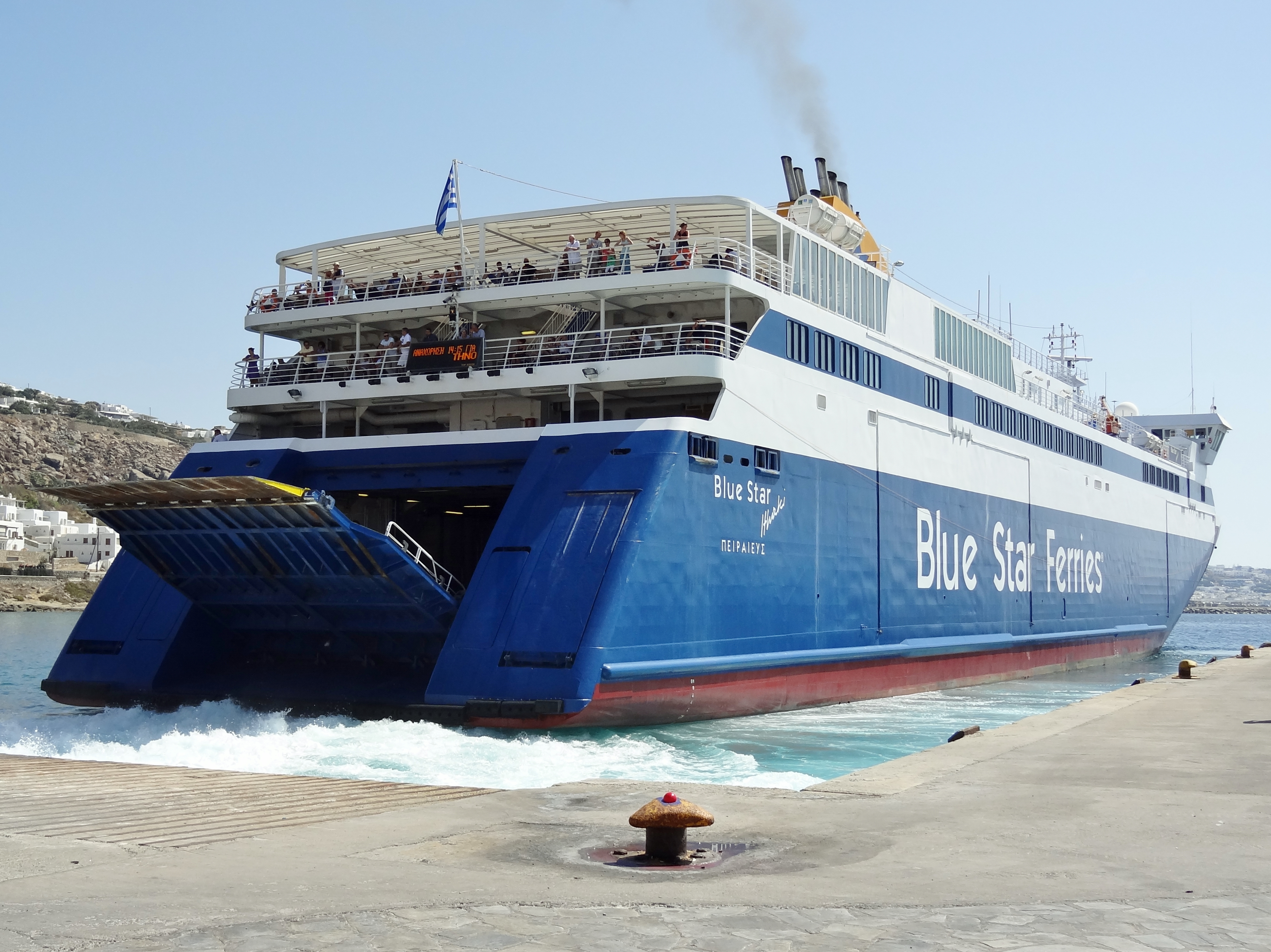
Blue Star Ferry

Mykonos Airport is located 4 kilometres (2.5 mi) southeast of the town of Mykonos and it is served by international flights during summer. The flight from Athens to Mykonos takes 25 minutes.

Mykonos is also accessible by boat and ferries. High speed vessels visit daily from the surrounding islands and from Athens.

Taxis, buses or boats are available for transportation. There are three main bus depots in Mykonos. The northern depot is situated behind Remezzo Club above the old port and provides regular service to Ano Mera, Elia and Kalafatis. A few hundred meters below, at the old port, lies another depot focusing on the northern destinations of Tourlos (New Port) and Agios Stefanos. The southern bus depot is at the town "entrance", called Fabrika and it provides regular service to Ornos, Agios Yannis, Plati Gialos, Psarou, Paraga, and Paradise Beach. Small boats travel to and from the many beaches. Tour boats go regularly to the nearby island of Delos.

== Culture ==
In 2013 the Mykonos Biennale was inaugurated offering theatrical, cultural, cinematic, artistic, and musical productions.

== Notable people ==
- Manto Mavrogenous
- Mary Paraskeva, early amateur photographer
- Nicholas Pettas, professional martial artist, kickboxer, and actor
- Ioannis Svoronos, archaeologist and numismatist
- Ioannis Toumbas, naval officer

== In popular culture ==
- Mykonos is among several Greek islands mentioned in Kenneth Koch's poem "Sleeping with Women".
- The final scene of The Bourne Identity (2002) is set in a scooter rental shop on Mykonos, depicted as a "hard to find" place in the film. Since then, the film's star, Matt Damon has returned on a regular basis, helping to make the island a celebrity destination.
- Movie star Lindsay Lohan produced an MTV series set in one of her properties on Mykonos, Lindsay Lohan's Beach Club, which ran for one season in 2019.
- The music video for the song "Stereo Love" by Edward Maya and Vika Jigulina was shot here.

== See also ==
- Communities of the Cyclades
- Mykonos vase
- List of traditional Greek place names
- Mykonos Biennale
