= List of equipment of the People's Liberation Army Navy =

Weapon systems of the naval branch of the People's Liberation Army of China

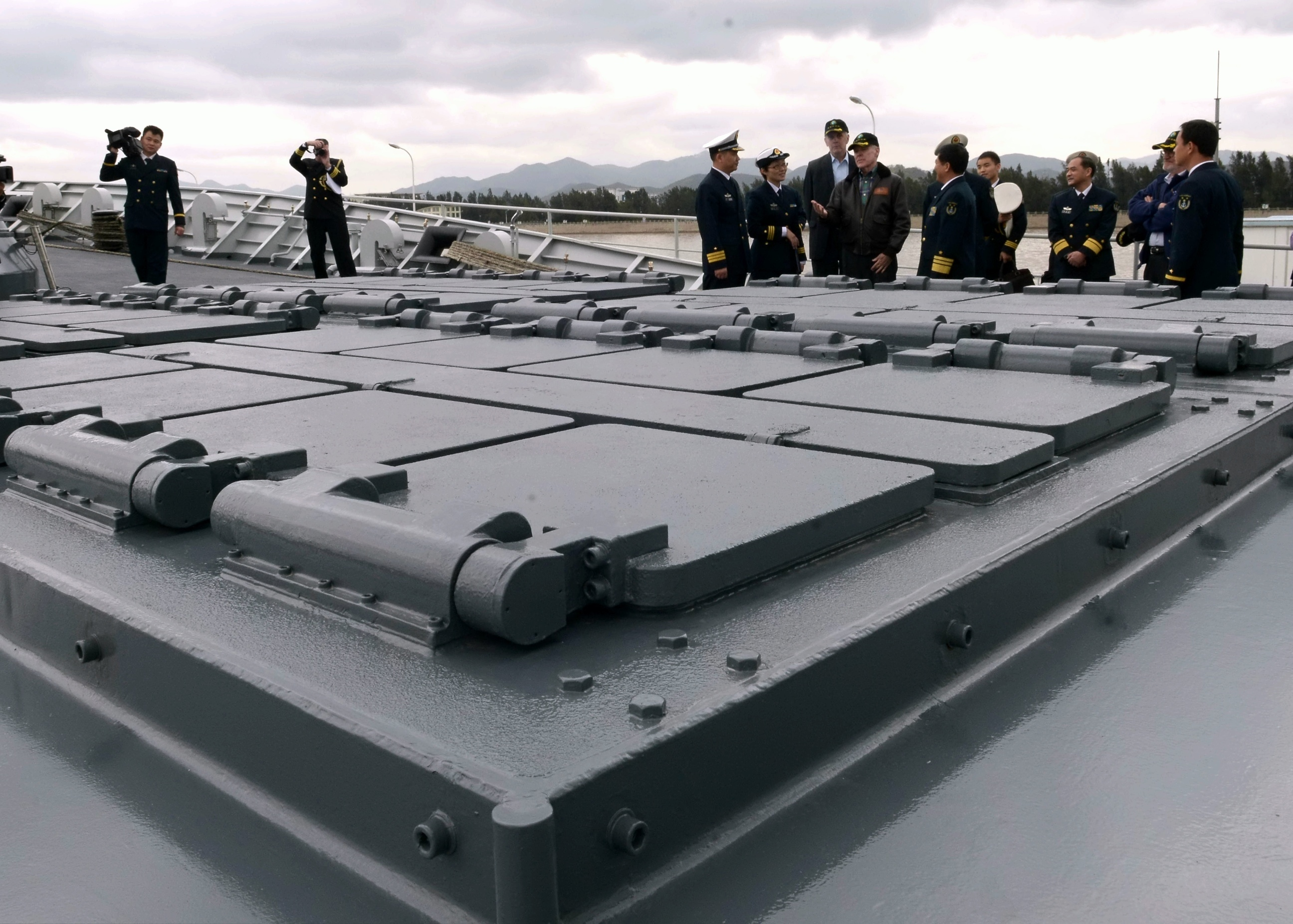
An example of modern Chinese vertical launching system (VLS) on board the Chinese frigate Xuzhou. The PLAN uses vertical launching systems to launch multiple types of missiles from its ships.

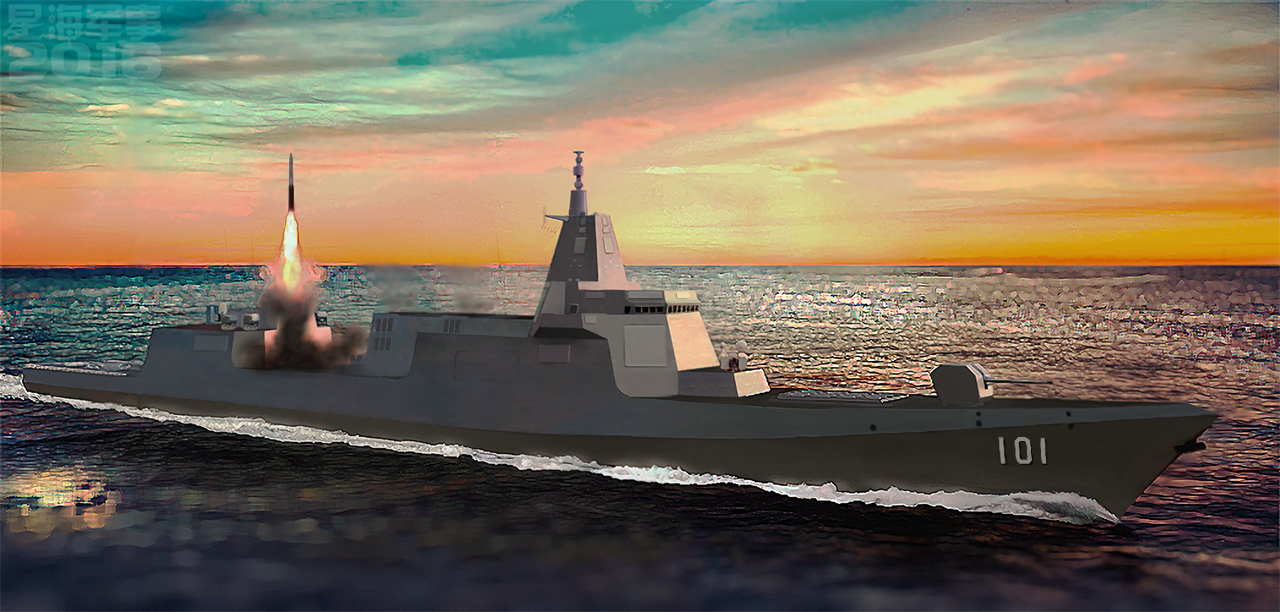
Artist's impression of Type 055 destroyer launching missile from its VLS

The Chinese People's Liberation Army Navy (PLAN) is the naval branch of the People's Liberation Army (PLA), the armed forces of the People's Republic of China. The PLAN force consists of approximately 384,000 men and women and over a four hundred combat vessels (excluding auxiliary ships), organized into three fleets: the North Sea Fleet, the East Sea Fleet, and the South Sea Fleet.

The People's Liberation Army Navy (PLAN) uses different types of modern naval weaponry including different models of artillery, torpedoes, and missiles, each geared to a specific threat range and type.

== History ==
Throughout its early history from 1949 to the early 1980s, the PLAN had principally relied upon artillery and anti-ship torpedoes as its main weapons. This resulted in the development of many types and calibers of anti-aircraft and anti-ship guns. Torpedoes were secondary weapons, playing an important role in PLAN's coastal defense doctrines. Now, many destroyers, frigates and corvettes of the PLAN all carry an array of anti-submarine torpedoes.

The adoption of the missile, like in most navies, has completely revolutionized Chinese naval capabilities and tactics. Also, there has been growing attention given to ASW, electronic, and airborne weaponry.

The Cultural Revolution was a major disruption to many weapons development programs of the PLAN. Advanced weaponry concepts were always in the minds of PLAN thinkers since the 1950s, even if they were unable to be implemented at the time. Therefore, a lot of modern weapon systems such as SAMs, modernized torpedoes and missile/sensor systems were not introduced into service until the early 1980s. Furthermore, economic and technical sophistication to produce the fire control, targeting systems, and tracking capabilities were not in place until the mid-1980s.

== Ships and aircraft ==
The People's Liberation Army Navy (PLAN) operates the largest naval fleet in the world by the number of commissioned vessels. The PLAN is rapidly building and commissioning new naval ships. PLAN operates more than 400 vessels without auxiliary ships. Various auxiliary ships together number more than 200. In 2023, the People's Liberation Army Navy Air Force (PLANAF) transferred land-based maritime bombers and most land-based fighter units to the People's Liberation Army Air Force (PLAAF), including at least 3 fighter brigades, 2 bomber regiments, 3 radar brigades, 3 air defense brigades, and some airbases. It retained its carrier aircraft, helicopters, a land-based fighter brigade with J-11B/BS, UAVs and other special purpose aircraft. The Navy is currently focused on carrier- and ship-based aircraft instead of land-based aircraft due to its growing aircraft carrier fleet.

=== List of active ship classes ===
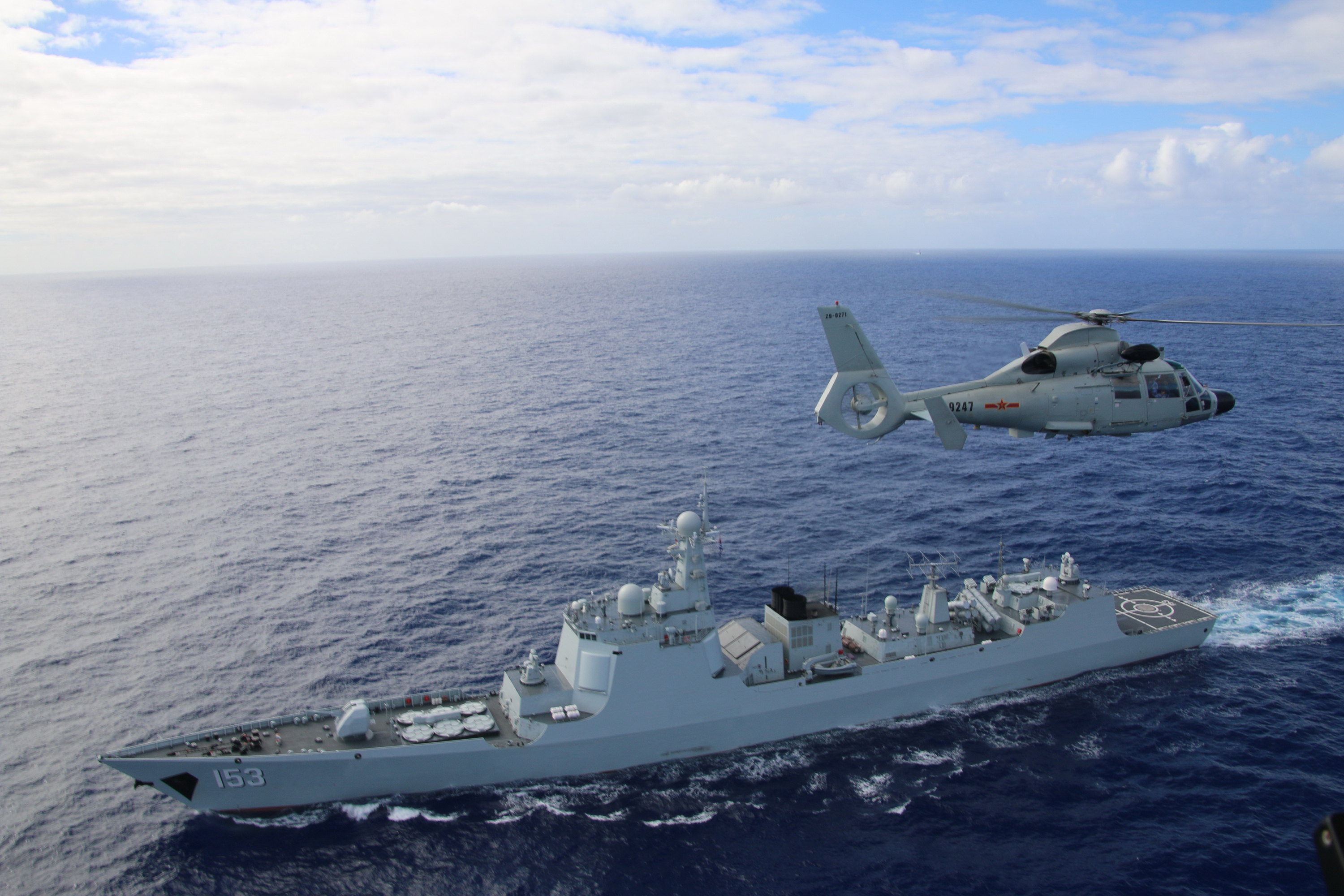
Type 052C destroyer Xi'an and Z-9 helicopter at RIMPAC 2016

- 7 Strategic ballistic missile submarines: Type 094 (6), Type 032 (1)
- 12-14 Nuclear-powered attack submarines: Type 093B (6–8), Type 093A (4), Type 093 (2)
- ≥48 Conventionally powered attack submarines: Type 039A/B/C (≥21), Kilo-class (10), Type 039 / 039G (13), Type 035B (4)
- 3 Aircraft Carriers: Type 003 (1), Type 002 (1), Type 001 (1)
- 5 Amphibious Assault Ships & Drone Carriers: Type 076 (1), Type 075 (4)
- 8 Amphibious Transport Docks: Type 071 (8)
- 61 Destroyers: Type 055 (10), Type 052D (35), Type 052C (6), Type 051C (2), Project 956EM (2), Project 956E (2), Type 051B (1), Type 052B (2), Type 052 (2)
- 54 Frigates: Type 054B (2), Type 054A (42), Type 054 (2), Type 053H3 (8)
- 50 Corvettes: Type 056A (50)
- 60 Missile boats: Type 022 (60)

=== List of active aircraft ===
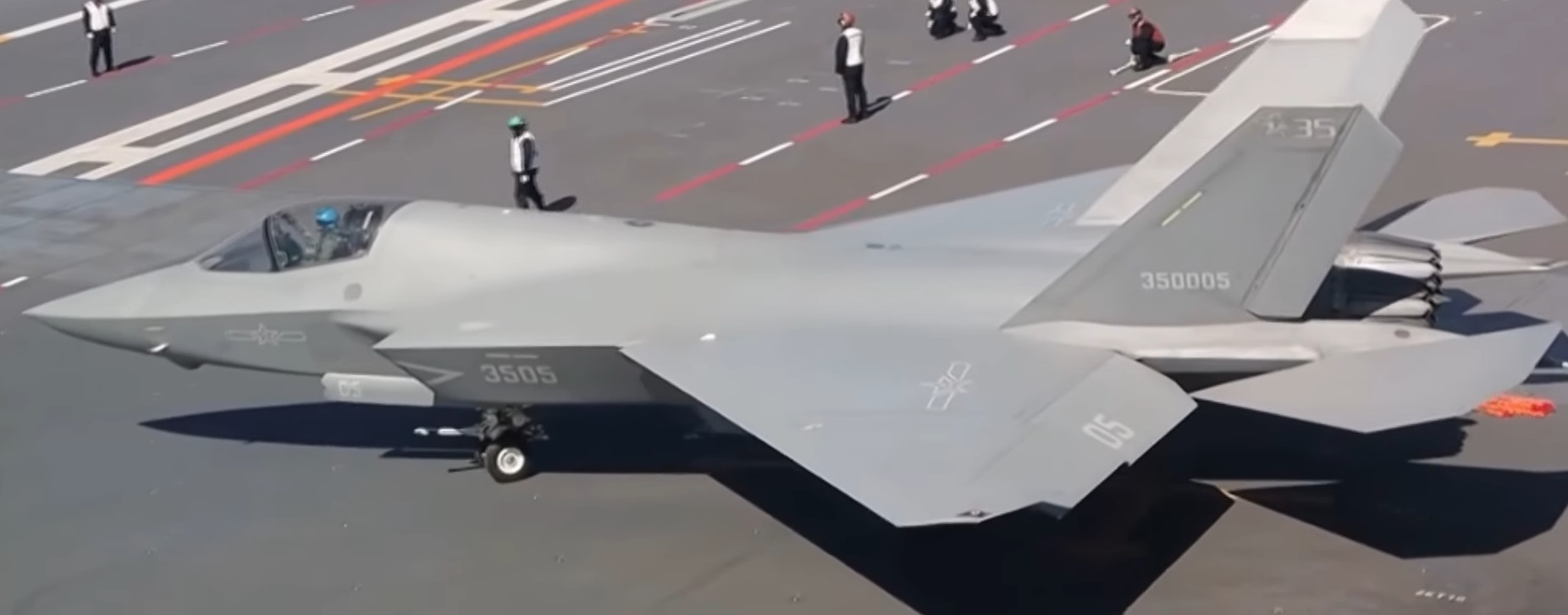
J-35 Blue Shark on aircraft carrier Fujian

- Airborne early warning and control: Xi'an KJ-600 Shaanxi KJ-500
- Fighters (multirole, strike, EW): J-35, J-15, J-11
- Helicopters (ASW, AEW, transport): Z-20, Z-18, Z-9, Z-8, Ka-31, Ka-28, Ka-27, Mi-8
- Maritime patrol and ASW aircraft: Y-9, Y-8
- Transport aircraft: CRJ200, CRJ700, Y-5, Y-7, Y-8

== Missiles ==
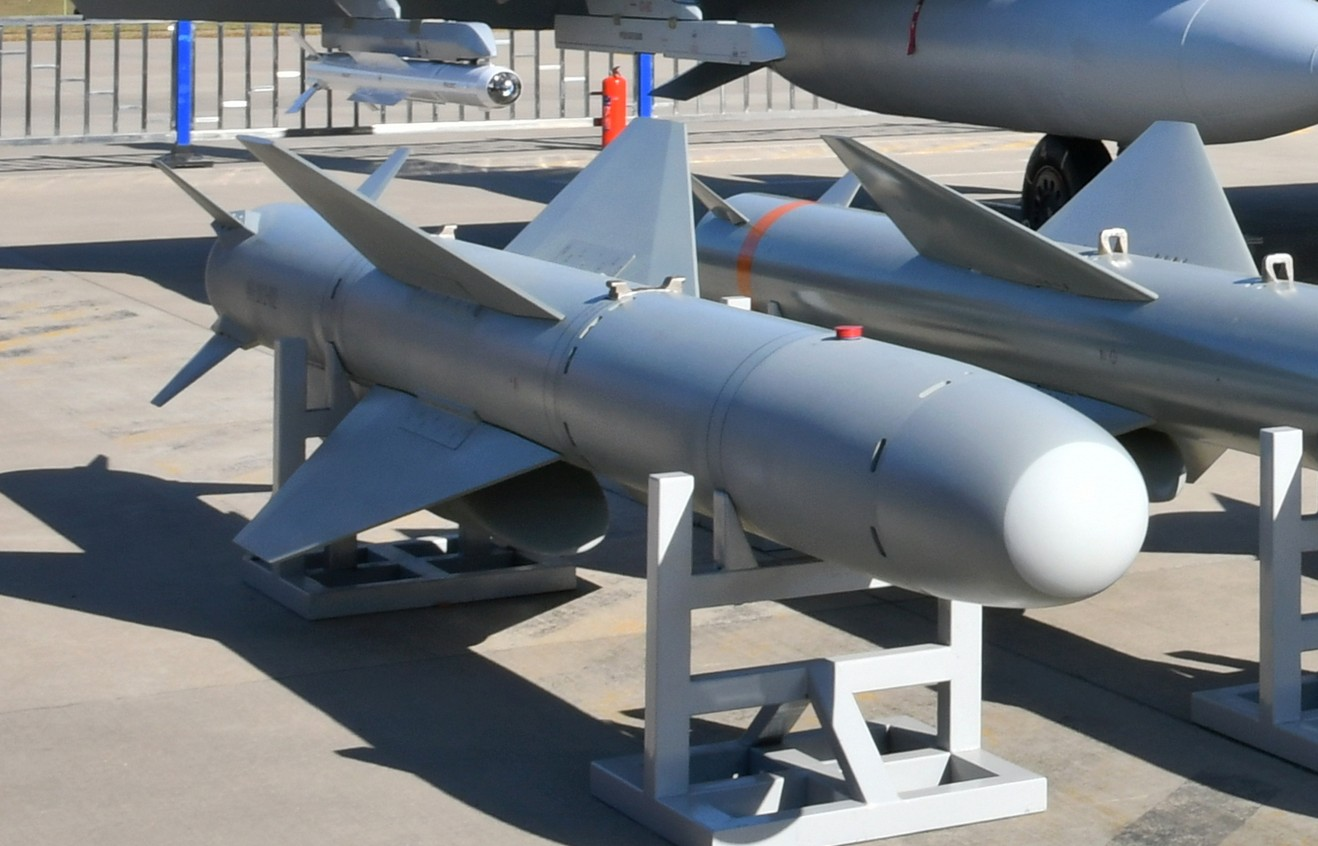
KD-88A standoff land attack missile

The PLAN has four main categories of missiles: anti-ship missiles (anti-ship cruise missiles and anti-ship ballistic missiles), anti-submarine missiles, surface-to-air missiles and land-attack missiles. The PLAN operates cruise and ballistic missiles launched from ships, ground platforms, aircraft, and submarines to engage enemy surface ships and land targets. It also operates torpedo-armed anti-submarine missiles from surface ships.

=== Anti-ship and anti-submarine missiles ===
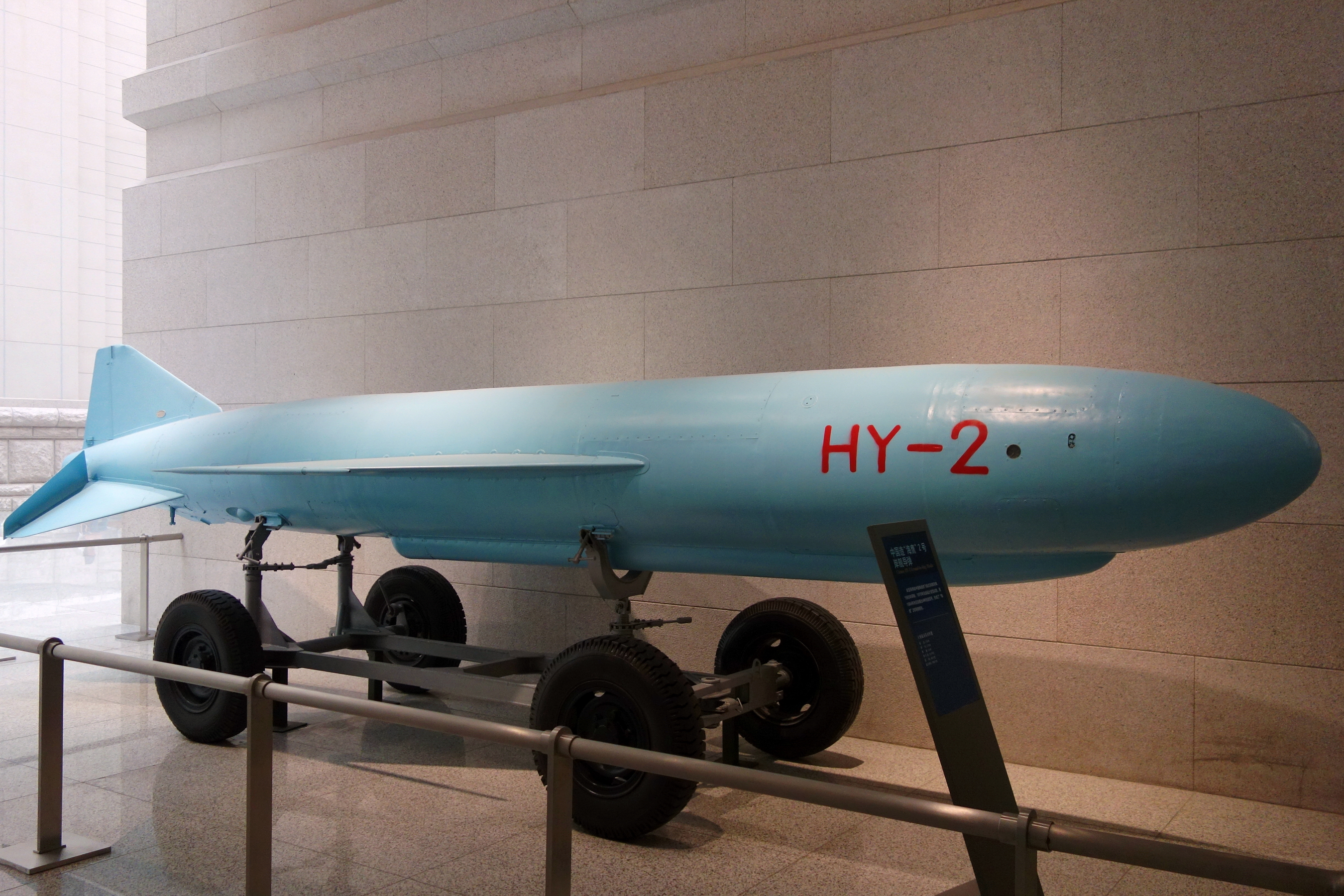
HY-2 was among the early Chinese subsonic anti-ship missiles

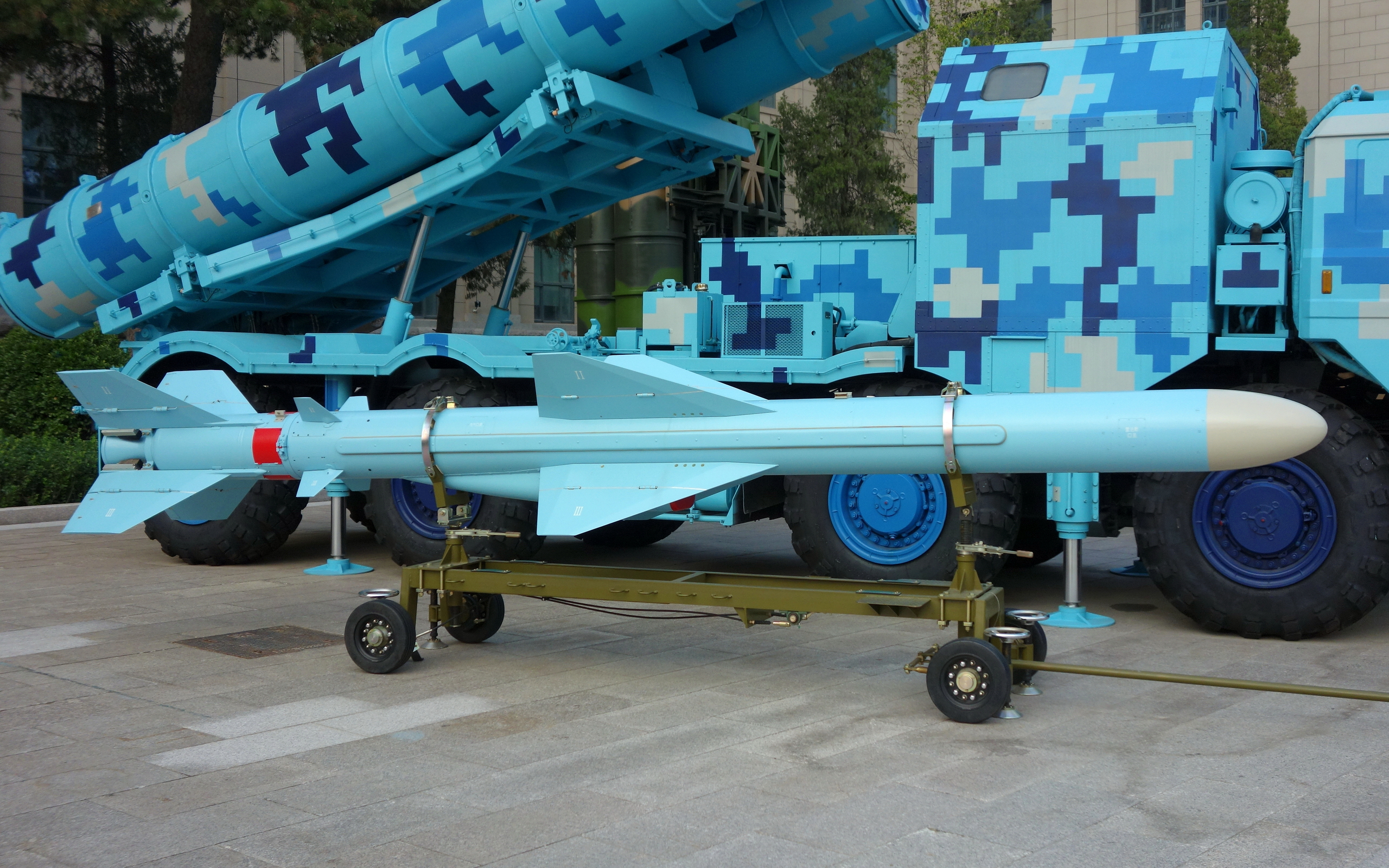
YJ-83J is among the active Chinese subsonic anti-ship missiles

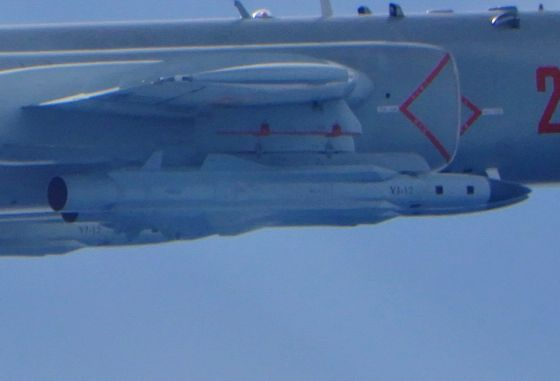
YJ-12 is among the active Chinese supersonic anti-ship missiles

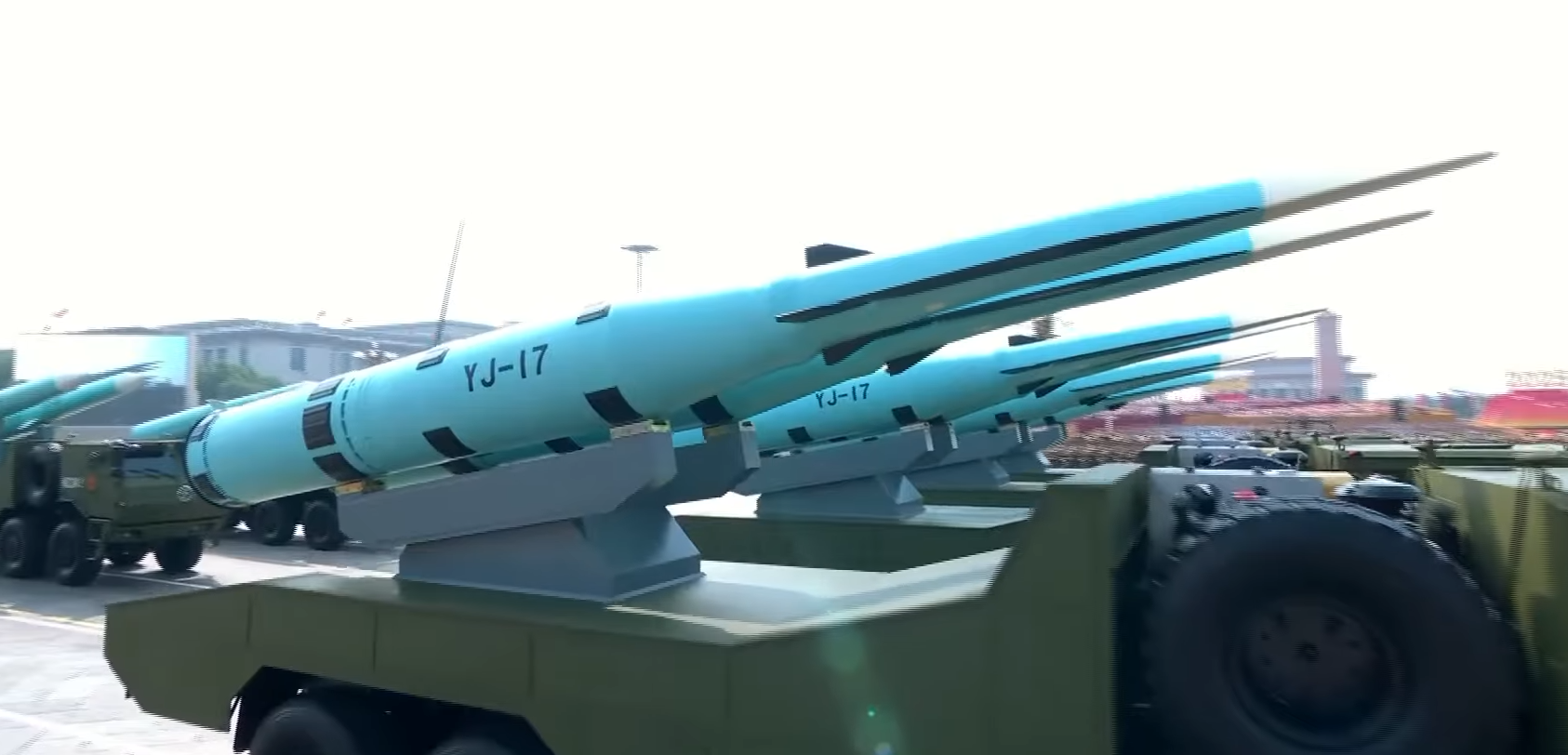
YJ-17 is among the active Chinese hypersonic anti-ship missiles

The PLAN current inventory mostly includes domestic missile models and some Russian missile models. The missile had been an ever-evolving component of PLAN weaponry since the late 1950s. The Soviet Union's assistance to Chinese military developments included the P-15 Termit (SS-N-2 Styx) anti-ship missile technology. Since the 1960s, China has manufactured its own models of anti-ship missile based on the SS-N-2 Styx, in the form of HY-1, SY-1, SY-2, and other airborne and ground-launched systems. The oldest designs have since been phased out. The fundamental shortcoming of missiles based on the SS-N-2 Styx are being short-ranged (only 40–100 km), slow, low in agility, and is rather large and easily detectable targets for modern SAM and CIWS. Later Chinese variants have vastly superior electronics, radar guidance and performance to the older Soviet models. As China has normalized its relationship with the former Soviet Union and then Russia, the importation of Russian missiles resumed, and a new generation of Russian anti-ship missiles have been imported, including the supersonic P-270 Moskit (SS-N-22) and submarine-launched version of the Klub-S.

China's first completely indigenous anti-ship missile program were the YJ-8 series. This missile externally appears similar to the French Exocet and American Harpoon, but is essentially a Chinese designed weapon system. The basic YJ-8 appeared in the early 1980s, with a short range of 22 miles (40 or so km). Unlike older designs, the YJ-8 could attack targets at low altitudes to reduce its vulnerability against defensive systems. Several models of the YJ-8 have since emerged. The YJ-81 is an air-launched variant and the submarine-launched variant of YJ-8 is YJ-82. The latest variant of YJ-8 is YJ-83, with a range of 180 km. In addition, YJ-82KD has ground attack capabilities.

The Chinese navy continues to prioritize anti‑surface warfare in its force modernization. Its frigates, corvettes along with upgraded older warships are armed with the YJ‑83 or YJ‑83J anti‑ship cruise missiles. The missile has a range of about 135 nautical miles (250 km). Newer 6 Type 052C (LUYANG II-class ) destroyers carry the longer‑range YJ-62 subsonic anti-ship cruise missiles, capable of striking targets out to 270 nautical miles (500 km). The latest Type 052D (Luyang III‑class) and Type 055 (Renhai‑class) destroyers deploy the YJ‑18A, with an estimated range of 290 nautical miles (537 km) and a terminal speed of Mach 2.5-3.0 to penetrate ship defenses. Several older but modernized destroyers have been retrofitted with the supersonic YJ-12A (270 nautical miles/500 km).

Within the submarine fleet, eight Kilo-class submarines employ the Russian‑built SS‑N‑27b, which can reach 120 nautical miles (222 km). China's indigenous Type 039 submarine (Song‑class) diesel‑electric submarines, Type 039A, B and C (Yuan‑class) AIP-equipped diesel‑electric attack submarines and Type 093 (Shang‑class) nuclear‑powered attack submarines carry the submarine‑launched version of thr YJ‑18 anti‑ship missile. Reports also indicate that China may be developing a containerized launcher for the YJ‑18, enabling covert deployment aboard merchant vessels.

Supersonic anti-ship missiles have been a key development in China. The Russian made ramjet-powered SS-N-22 Sunburn supersonic anti-ship missiles were operated by China on board its Sovremenny class destroyers until replaced by the Chinese made supersonic anti-ship missile YJ-12. China is currently producing both supersonic and hypersonic anti-ship missiles. China also leads in the field of hypersonic missiles. High speed missiles are seen as one of the most effective means of attacking modern warships. Only a few countries have so far successfully developed and deployed such weapons. Earlier unsuccessful Chinese supersonic anti-ship missiles were HY-3 (export version C-301) and C-101.

Some examples of advanced Chinese anti-ship missiles of today are the YJ-12, YJ-15, YJ-17, YJ-18, YJ-19, YJ-20 and YJ-21. Among those missiles, YJ-18 anti-ship missile accelerates from subsonic to supersonic speeds when it is close to its target; YJ-12 and YJ-15 are supersonic anti-ship cruise missiles; YJ-19 is a hypersonic anti-ship cruise missile; YJ-20 and YJ-21 are hypersonic anti-ship ballistic missiles; YJ-17 is a hypersonic anti-ship aeroballistic missile, featuring a hypersonic glide vehicle (HGV) warhead.

Multiple Chinese made anti-ship missiles of the PLAN have air-launched variants. Those missiles are operated by the People's Liberation Army Navy Air Force and the People's Liberation Army Air Force. The PLAN's air force has also purchased anti-ship and anti-radiation (anti-radar) variants of the Kh-31 ramjet-powered supersonic missiles.

PLAN also developed several modern anti-submarine missiles such as CY-5. Those are missiles that carried a torpedo as its warhead. PLAN forces ASW capabilities also improved with the introduction of Variable Depth Sonar (VDS), which is mounted on surface ships.

==== Current anti-ship missiles ====
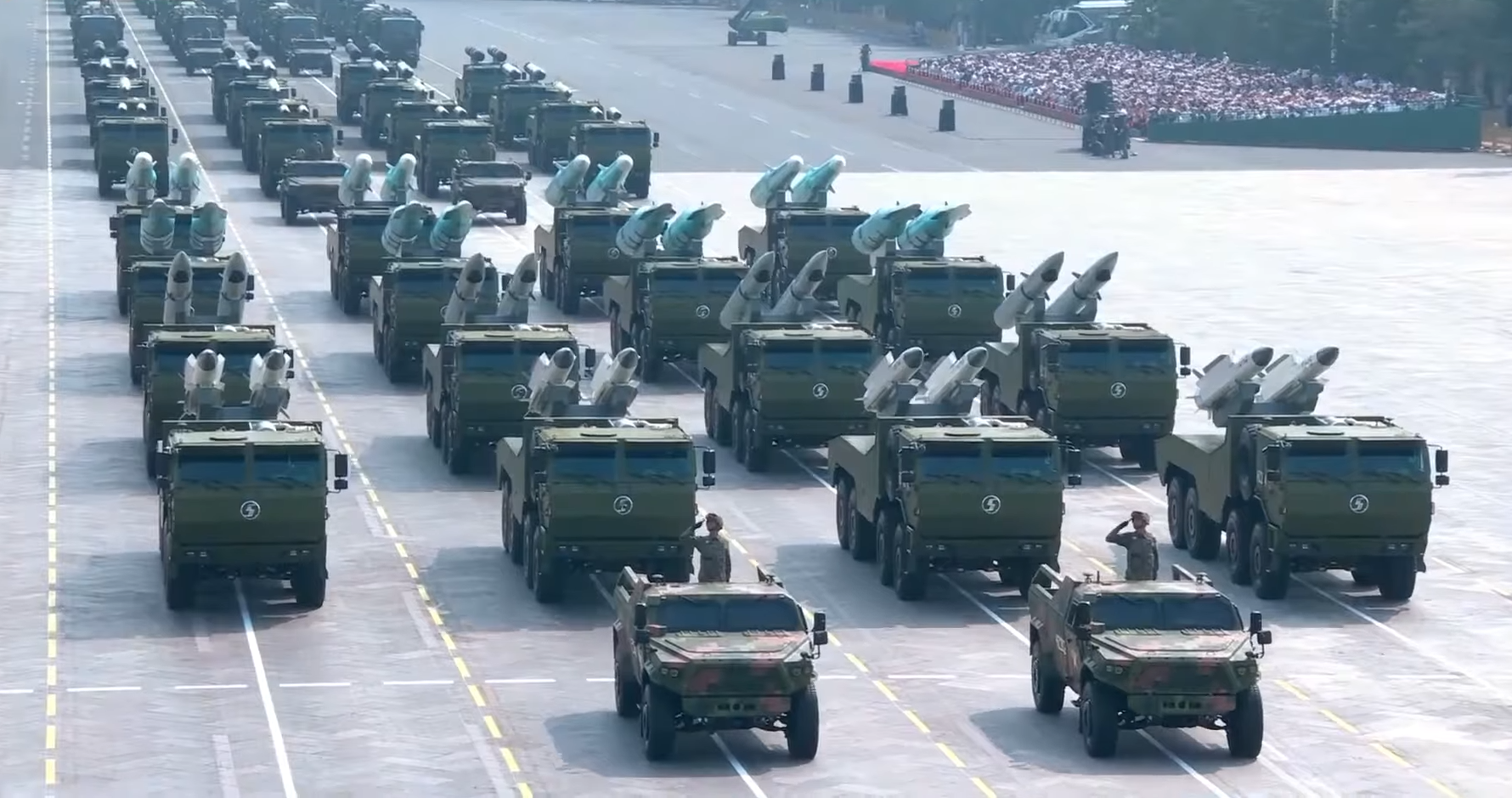
YJ-15, YJ-17, YJ-19 and YJ-20 anti-ship missiles at the 2025 China Victory Day Parade

- YJ-7
- YJ-12
- YJ-15
- YJ-17
- YJ-18
- YJ-19
- YJ-20
- YJ-21
- YJ-62
- YJ-83
- YJ-91A

==== Current anti-submarine missiles ====
- CJ-1
- CY-1
- CY-2
- CY-3
- CY-4
- CY-5
- Yu-8

==== Anti-ship missiles no longer in use ====
- C-101
- Silkworm family (older versions)
- YJ-8

=== Surface-to-air missiles (SAM) ===
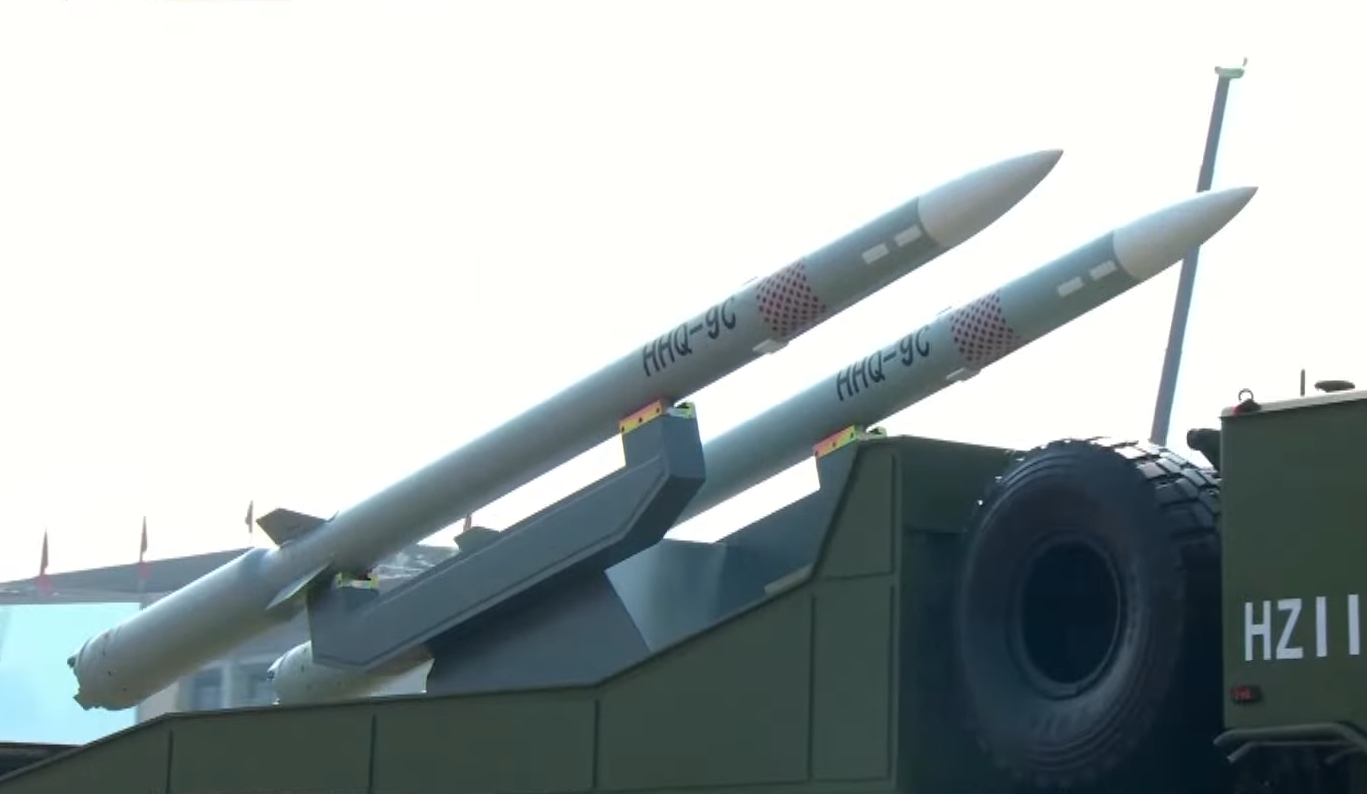
Long-range SAM HHQ-9C's mockup at the 2025 China Victory Day Parade

China's People's Liberation Army Navy (PLAN) currently operates multiple types of surface-to-air missile (SAM) systems. During Cold War era, the navy had long lacked an air defense missile system, hence why it has been a major area of weakness. China's SAM development had been seriously jeopardized by the Cultural Revolution, and the break away from the Soviet Union meant that no Soviet assistance in air defense missiles was given. The first Chinese-made naval SAM system was the HQ-61, originally a short-range land-based system. The SAM system was installed on only a few ships of the PLAN. The first PLAN ship to be armed with SAM was the Type 053K frigate Yingtan, launched in 1970. However it took many years for the design to mature and the obsolete system was never ideal for naval operations. The Jiangdong had two twin launchers of the HQ61 SAM. The missile was capable of engaging enemy air targets out to 10 km. The four Type 053H2G frigates (Jiangwei I) were armed with a six tube launcher. The weakness, however, was lack of automatic reload systems, so the crew had to manually reload.

When China opened up in the late 1970s, it had greater access to Westernized technologies. One vital asset imported was the French Crotale short-ranged SAM. Two systems were initially imported and mounted aboard two Luda class destroyers. The design was subsequently indigenized into the HQ-7. The improved-Luda, Luhu, Luhai, Jiangwei II, and 054 class warships. The launcher is an eight-celled system, with a reload hatch, which has additional missiles below deck. Its engagement range is 10–12 km and is claimed to be capable of engaging low-flying missiles and aircraft.

Although the HQ-7 was a significant step towards PLAN air defense capabilities, the PLAN still fell short of possessing a medium- to long-range missile system that could provide true fleet defense coverage. The purchase of Russian Sovremenny class destroyers meant China obtained the medium-range SA-N-7 SAM and its subsequent improved models. This missile was more advanced than HQ-61 and HQ-7. The missile was soon adapted for service on board the PLAN's two Type 052B destroyers. China also imported the Russian S-300FM (SA-N-20) long-range SAM system for two Type 051C destroyers. It is a vertical launched system (VLS) with a range of 100 km.

Meanwhile, China had developed the long-range HHQ-9 family and medium-range HHQ-16 family surface-to-air missile systems. The HQ-9 believed to have partially borrowed some of the features on both Russian S-300 and US Patriot technology (fire control). This was China's first indigenous long-range high-performance air defense missile.

The HHQ-9 family of missiles includes the HHQ-9, HHQ-9B and HHQ-9C. The HHQ-9B and HHQ-9C are further upgraded versions of the initial HHQ-9. The system is installed on the Type 052C, Type 052D and Type 055 destroyers.

The HQ-16 family of missiles includes the HQ-16, HQ-16B and HQ-16C. The HQ-16B and HQ-16C are further upgraded versions of the initial HQ-16. The system is installed on Type 054A and Type 054B frigates, as well as the new Type 055, the modernized Type 051B, Type 052B and Sovremenny-class destroyers.

With VLS-launched missiles finally in service with the PLAN, the HHQ-10 SAM-based CIWS replaced the HQ-7 as point defense missile.

==== Current SAM systems ====
- HQ-9 family: HHQ-9, HHQ-9B, HHQ-9C (long-range)
- S-300FM (long-range)
- HQ-16 family: HQ-16B, HQ-16C (medium-range)

==== Anti-air missiles no longer in use ====
- SA-N-7 'Gadfly' (navalised Buk)
- HQ-6
- HQ-7

=== Submarine-launched ballistic missiles ===
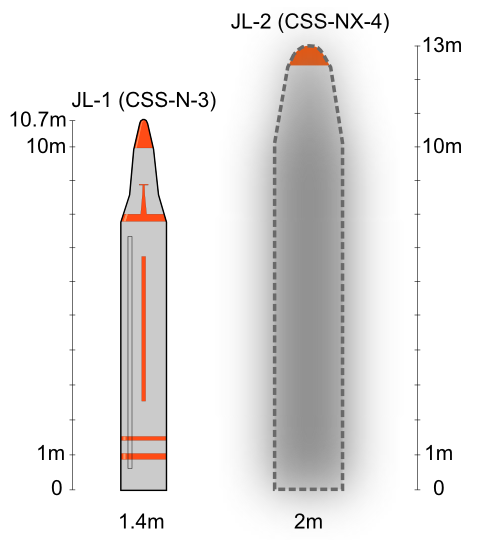
Size comparison between the Chinese first generation SLBM JL-1 and second generation SLBM JL-2

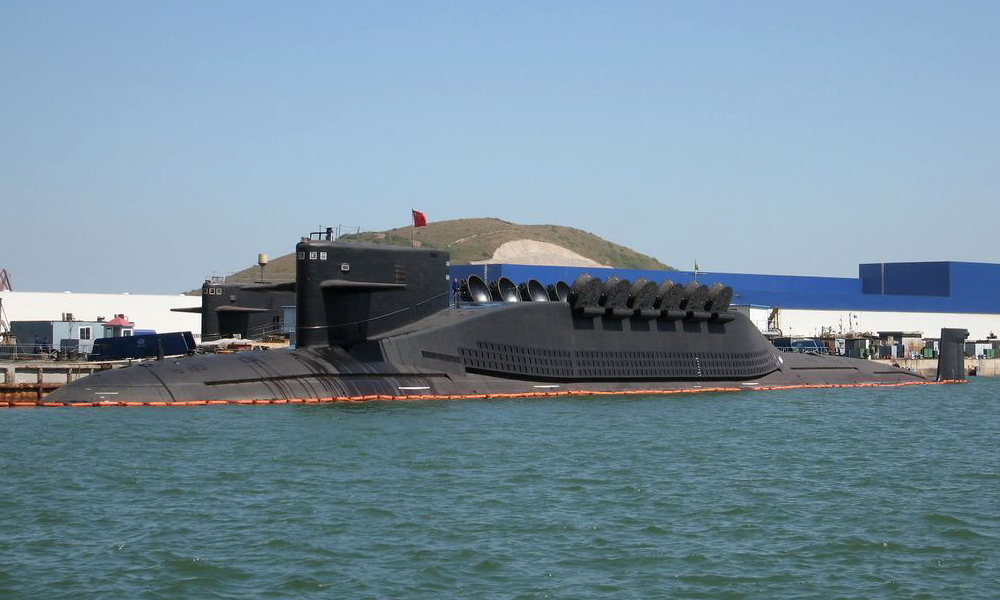
The Type 094 nuclear-powered strategic ballistic missile submarines, currently armed with JL-3 intercontinental-range SLBMs, are part of China's nuclear triad

China launched its nuclear-powered ballistic missile submarine (SSBN) program in the late 1950s. Since the early 2000s, China has rapidly advanced its nuclear-powered ballistic missile submarines (SSBNs), submarine-launched ballistic missiles (SLBMs), and their associated support systems. JL-1, JL-2 and JL-3 are among the Chinese submarine-launched ballistic missiles. The JL-1 was first test from a modified Golf-class submarine in 1982 and first successfully launched from the Type 092 nuclear-powered ballistic missile submarine (SSBN) in 1988. The JL-1 was carried on board China's early SSBN, the Type 092 submarine. It has 12 launch tubes. Each JL-1 has a maximum range 1,700- 2,150 km and a single 250-500 kt nuclear warhead. An improved variant was known as JL-1A with an increased maximum range of 2500 km. The missile is not related to the air launched JL-1 of the People's Liberation Army Air Force.

The JL-2 is Chinese second generation of Chinese SLBM. The missile has a minimum range of 2,000 and maximum range of greater than 8000 km. The missile can be armed with a single 1-megaton yield nuclear warhead or 3-8 lower yield multiple warheads (MIRV). This missile is essentially based on the land based DF-31 ICBM design. This means that JL-2 armed Type 094 SSBNs can patrol inside Chinese waters and capable of hitting the US territory of Guam, as well as the states of Hawaii and Alaska. These SSBNs would also be able to hit the American mainland with JL-2 when patrolling near Alaska.

The JL-2 missile succeced by the JL-3 and armed the Type 094 submarine SSBNs. The latest generation of the Chinese SLBM has an estimated range of 10,000 km and carries multiple MIRV-type warheads. This means that JL-3 armed Type 094 SSBNs can even patrol inside Chinese waters and launch missiles that could hit the American mainland. Chinese future Type 096 SSBNs are also going to armed with JL-3. On the morning of July 6, 2026, a Chinese nuclear-powered ballistic missile submarine (SSBN) stationed in the South China Sea fired a JL-2 or JL-3 missile that traveled roughly 7,300 kilometers (4,536 miles) carrying a dummy warhead.

==== List of submarine-launched ballistic missiles ====
- JL-1 (no longer in use)
- JL-2 (currently in service)
- JL-3 (currently in service)

== Close-in weapon systems (CIWS) ==
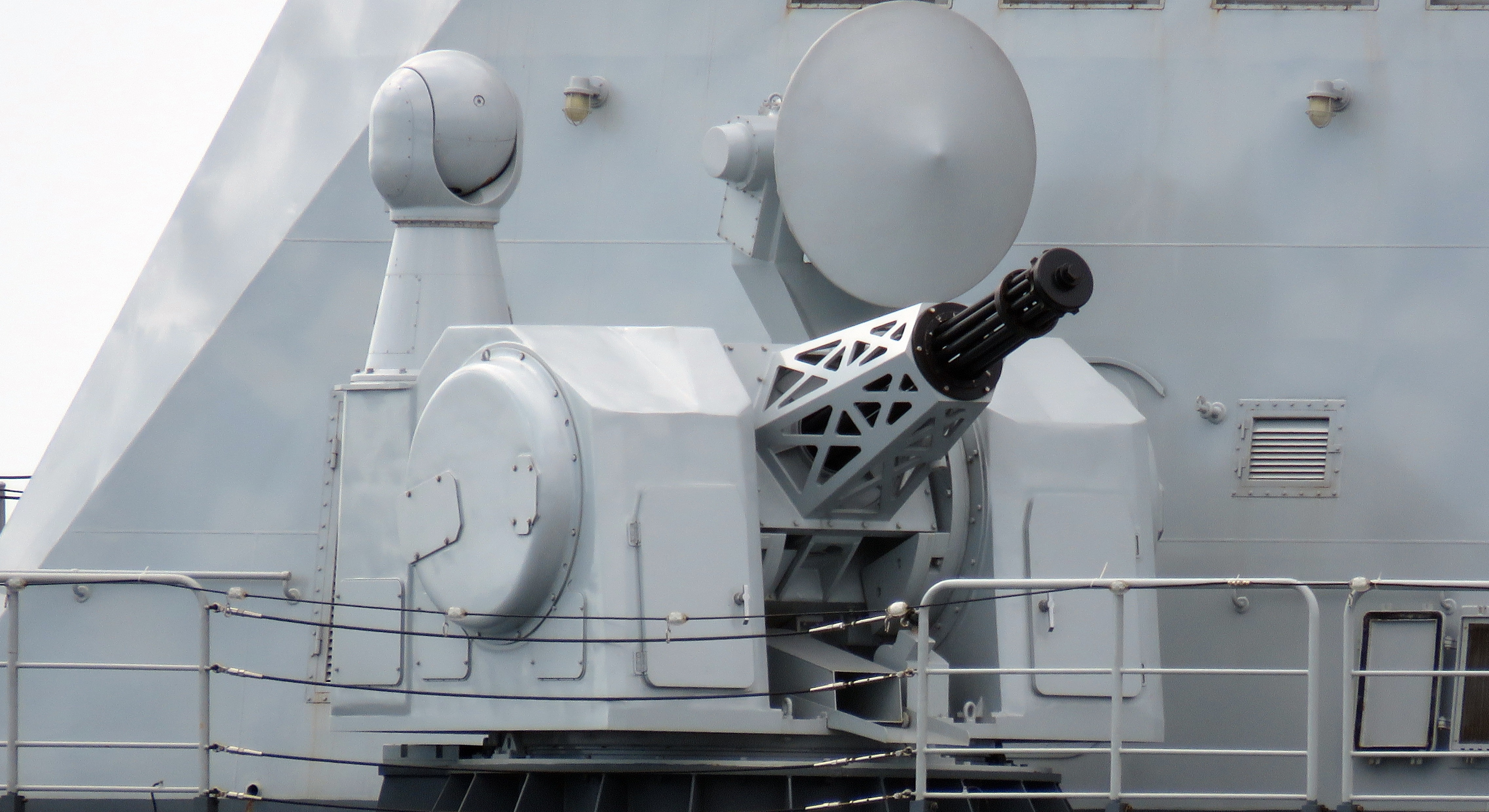
Gun-based CIWS Type 1130 on board Chinese frigate Handan (579).

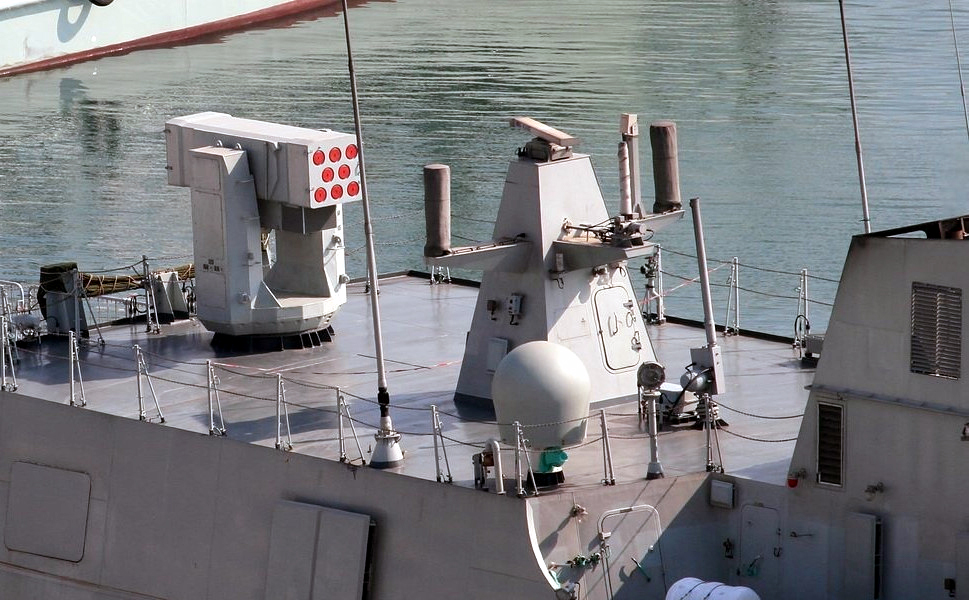
Missile-based CIWS HHQ-10's 8-round launcher on a Type 056 corvette

Many navies in the world operate a variety of close-in weapon systems (CIWS). These systems are designed to engage high speed, low altitude targets at close range. One particular target for the CIWS is incoming anti-ship missiles. A CIWS with its rapid fire and radar control could hopefully defeat incoming missiles. China until 21st century had mostly lacked a modern CIWS system. Some ships were armed with obsolete AK-230 (Type 69) systems. The Russian builts Sovremenny-class destroyers that were purchased in a 1996 deal gave China its first modern CIWS capability. These used a CIWS called the AK-630, with mounts that were exclusive to the Russian ships. The purchase of two additional Sovremenny class destroyers give PLAN the Kashtan CIWS system. China produced a version of the AK630 as their first CIWS. These have been fitted on board the two Type 054 frigates and the Type 022 missile boats.

A Chinese system, the Type 730, is China's first entirely indigenous CIWS. Though externally similar to the Dutch Goalkeeper, it is thought to operate indigenous radar and optical systems. It has seven barrels, and fires 30 mm caliber shells in rapid succession (4,600-5,800 rounds per minute). Type 1130 Golden Shield is the latest version of the Type 730. China also developed a missile-based CIWS which is called HHQ-10. Those Chinese made CIWS are used in latest surface combatants of the PLAN. CIWS also replaced some Type 76 twin 37 mm naval gun mounts on older combatants. Russian made CIWS of PLAN's last two Sovremenny-class destroyers are also replaced by Chinese CIWS.

=== Current close-in weapon systems (CIWS) ===
- HHQ-10 (missile-based CIWS)
- Type 1130 Golden Shield
- Type 730
- AK-630 mod
- AK-630

=== Close-in weapon system no longer in use ===
- AK-230 (Type 69)
- Kashtan CIWS

== Torpedoes, mines and rocket-based weaponry ==
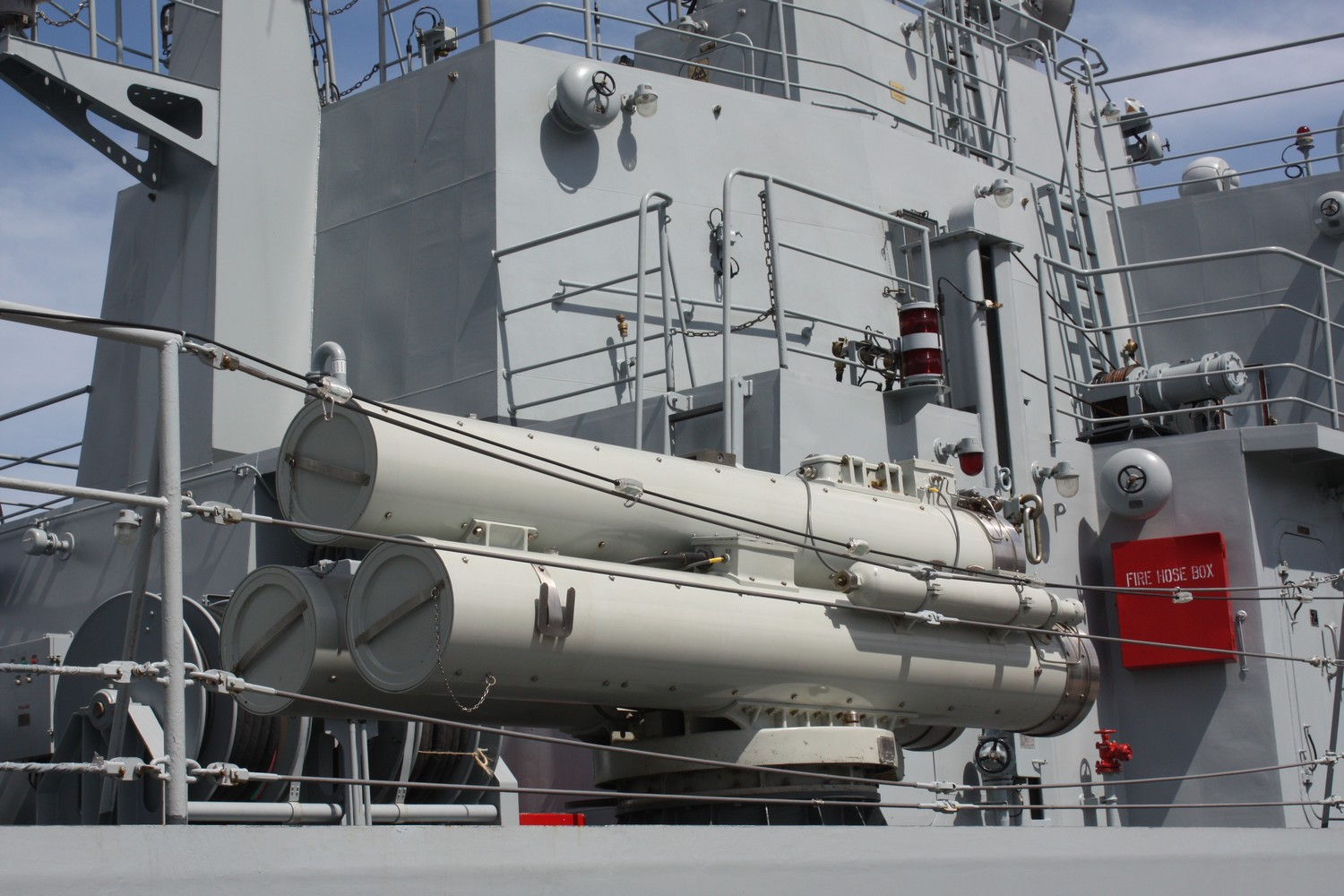
ET-52C torpedo launchers, export model of the Yu-7 torpedo, mounted on the PNS Zulfiquar frigate.

The surface ship launched anti-ship torpedo is no longer used by the PLAN. Surface ships are now installed with anti-submarine torpedoes. However, surface ship launched anti-ship torpedoes were very dominant among the coastal attack craft until replaced by the anti-ship missiles. With the success of torpedo boats in World War I and World War II, the PLAN sought the use of torpedoes in its defense as well. The agility of small coastal craft coupled with fast torpedoes was a grave threat for larger combat vessels. The 1950s, 1960s and 1970s saw a large number of torpedo craft built (as many as 200 operated at one stage). In later years, like the most other modern navies, the PLAN shifted role of the surface ship launched torpedoes for ASW applications. Most major surface ships of the PLAN now feature torpedo tubes. One the other hand, PLAN used submarine launched torpedoes for both the anti-surface and anti-submarine role. In addition, PLAN helicopters employ dipping sonar and sonobuoys to detect submarines, while their fixed-wing maritime patrol aircraft rely primarily on sonobuoys. Once a target is located, these platforms can engage it with air-dropped torpedoes.

=== History ===
The torpedo programs of the People's Republic of China was set up under the guidance of the former Soviet Union in the 1950s, when China built two torpedo factories under Soviet direction, and began its license assembly of unguided straight-running torpedoes. In April 1958, Naval Arms Ministry of People's Liberation Army Navy (PLAN) established torpedo research institute indigenously. Four months later, the deputy chief-of-staff of PLA Zhang Aiping and the deputy commander-in-chief of LAN Luo Shunchu (罗舜初) led a military delegation to visit former-Soviet Union signed a deal with Soviets to produce three types of Soviet torpedoes in China. In comparison with other military programs, each with dozens or even hundreds of Soviet advisors, however, former-Soviet Union did not put that much emphasis on the torpedo capability: the total number of Soviet advisors initially sent to China for all of its torpedo programs was only five.

The Soviet Union quickly delivered the samples and technical information of the three types of torpedoes to China with the five advisors to China as promised. Two Soviet advisors were assigned to assist China to produce the RAT-52 rocket-powered torpedo, while others were assigned to teach China about compressed oxygen and SAET-60 passive homing acoustic homing torpedoes. In July 1960, the first two samples of Chinese-built rocket-propelled torpedoes were completed. The propulsion system and electronics of the electrically powered passive acoustic homing torpedo had also been completed, while the basic technologies of compressed oxygen torpedoes was also mastered by China. Everything appeared to be great but the subsequent Sino-Soviet split ended the promising future: from July 28 to September 1, 1960, former Soviet Union had quickly withdrawn all of its advisors from China.

To compound the problem, other domestic political turmoils such as Great Leap Forward and Cultural Revolution had further seriously hindered the indigenous Chinese torpedo developments. As a result, the most numerous torpedoes in Chinese inventory were unguided straight-running torpedoes. In 1978 the PLAN gained significant torpedo capability when a single US Mk 46 Mod.1 block 2 torpedo, thought to be recovered by fishermen, was reverse-engineered and became the Yu-7 ASW torpedo. It is thought that during the 1980s, the Yu-7 design also benefited from subsequent batches of Mk 46 Mod. 2 torpedoes purchased for PLAN from United States for a total US$8 million in 1985. The Yu-7 has become the foundation of PLAN anti-submarine warfare. Yu-7 is mostly seen carried by the Z-9C and Z-8 helicopters, and shipboard variants can be launched from destroyers, frigates and corvettes.

From October to November 1983, Chinese Northwestern Polytechnical University completed upgrade of the acoustic test facilities under the direction of California Institute of Technology, and this facility played an important role in Chinese torpedo development ever since. In 1993, China ordered three types of Soviet torpedoes along with its purchase of Kilo class submarines: TEST-71, which was replaced by its successor TEST-96 in the 2nd order, and Type 53–65. It is also reported that China had ordered the Russian APR-3E light ASW torpedo for its Ka-28 helicopter and Be-200 ASW aircraft. Yu-11 is the latest surface-ship and aircraft launched ASW torpedo.

=== Current torpedoes ===
- AMB012 lightweight torpedo
- AQA010 heavyweight torpedo
- Yu-1
- Yu-2
- Yu-3
- ET32
- Yu-4
- APR-3E
- A244-S
- Shkval
- ET52
- Yu-5
- ET34
- ET36
- C43
- Yu-6
- Yu-7
- Yu-9
- Yu-10
- Yu-11

Chinese submarines have operated a variety of indigenously designed torpedoes. The first submarine launched basic unguided torpedo was Yu-1. Unguided torpedoes are no longer used by the PLAN. PLAN submarine force now used highly advanced Yu-6 and Yu-9 torpedoes. Yu-6 is the first submarine launched domestic Chinese torpedo designed to counter both surface ships and submarines from the very start. Most of the details of the PLAN torpedo designs are not publicly available.

Ita was though that, first generation of the submarine launched torpedoes of PLAN were lacked the advanced capabilities to home in against agile or quiet targets. However, with the delivery of Russian Kilos, China also obtained some highly advanced Russian torpedo designs. One such weapon is the Wake homing torpedo, which homes on a surface ship's wake rather than just sonar readings. It is believed such technology has been applied to upgraded the Chinese torpedoes such as the Yu-5. In addition, Jane's Information Group reported, in the late 1990s, that China had already purchased numerous 200-knot Russian Shkval torpedoes from Kazakhstan and was negotiating in purchasing the Soviet torpedo factory there.

=== Anti-submarine rockets and depth charges ===
- S3V un-propelled guided depth charge
- Type-87 anti-submarine rocket

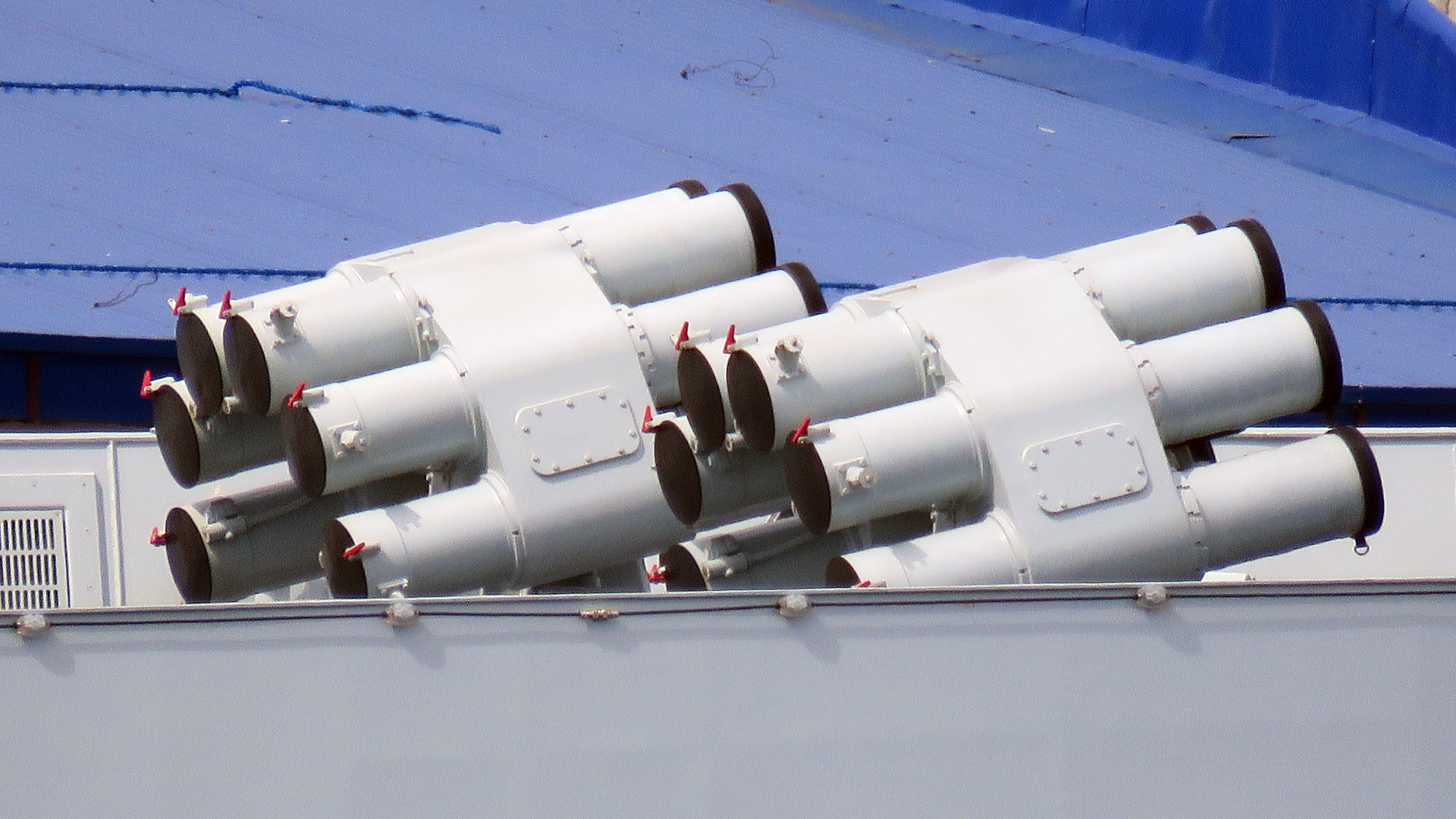
Chinese Navy Type-87 anti-submarine rocket launcher system

ASW warfare capability of the PLAN increased greatly. PLAN vessels armed with anti-submarine torpedoes, anti-submarine missiles, anti-submarine rockets and depth charges. Chinese anti-submarine rocket are based on Russian designs, and are capable of firing rocket bombs at short ranges. It is believed to be effective against shallow targets as well as a possible shield of stopping incoming torpedoes. Most PLAN combatants have traditionally two to four multi-barreled launchers in front of the main gun.

=== Mine warfare ===
Mine warfare has also been another traditional component of PLAN weaponry. Mines remain to be seen as a very useful power amplifying tool by the PLAN. Strategic minefields could be laid around the Taiwan Strait to deny access or delay deployment of US Navy forces, particularly aircraft carrier battle groups and submarines. Chinese mines have continually been addressed by many analysts and scholars as a very dangerous weapon that could be employed against the US Navy.

Most PLAN destroyers, frigates, littoral craft and submarines can lay mines. Chinese mines vary in type, from basic contact/magnetic mines to more modern and complex systems. China first decided to establish dedicated factories for naval mines in 1954, and in 1958, several programs of naval mines were launched simultaneously by Fengxi Machinery Factory. The first of these, Moored-1 (Mao-1), a large sized moored mine entered mass production in 1962 after being tested multiple times and evaluated by the navy. Most early Chinese mines are either Soviet origin, or direct copies of Soviet mines, with the exception of remotely controlled mine.

The first three types of naval mines entered the Chinese service are all moored mines equipped with contact fuses, and all of them are developed by the Fengxi Machinery Factory. Moored-1 is a large sized mine and Moored-2 (Mao-2) is a medium-sized mine, a copy of Soviet KSM mine, and both types require target to strike the mine for detonation. Moored-3 (Mao-3) is a mine with contact wires so that targets would not have to strike the mine itself for detonation, and the mine can be detonated some distance away, still causing enough damage if the target is within range and comes in contact with the contact wire. Moored-1 and Moored-2 entered mass production in 1964 and 1965 respectively.

In the 1970s, China had successfully developed non-contact fuses such as the acoustic fuse, and earlier contact fuse equipped mines were upgraded with non-contact fuses. Also in 1970, Fengxi Machinery Factory and Engineering Technology Equipment Research Institute begun to jointly develop a riverine moored mine that can be remotely controlled fuse. The project was completed in 1974, and the ultrasonic remote control can be either used to arm or disarm the mines, or alternatively, directly detonate the mine.

Since the 1990s, all of mines in the Chinese inventory are upgraded with computerized controls and a new series of Chinese mines were actively marketed for the export, including derivatives from existing mines as well as a brand-new design such as the one similar to American CAPTOR mine.

Chinese naval mines with known designations:

- Drifting-2 drifting mine
- Moored-1 moored mine (large)
- Moored-2 moored mine (medium)
- Moored-3 moored mine (contact wires)
- Moored-4 moored mine
- Sinking-1 bottom mine
- Sinking-2 bottom mine
- Sinking-3 bottom mine
- Sinking-4 bottom mine
- Sinking-5 bottom mine
- Specialized-1 rocket propelled mine
- Specialized-2 remotely controlled mine
- Training-1 Training mine
- Type 500 training mine
- EM12 bottom mine (mainly for export)

== Artillery systems ==
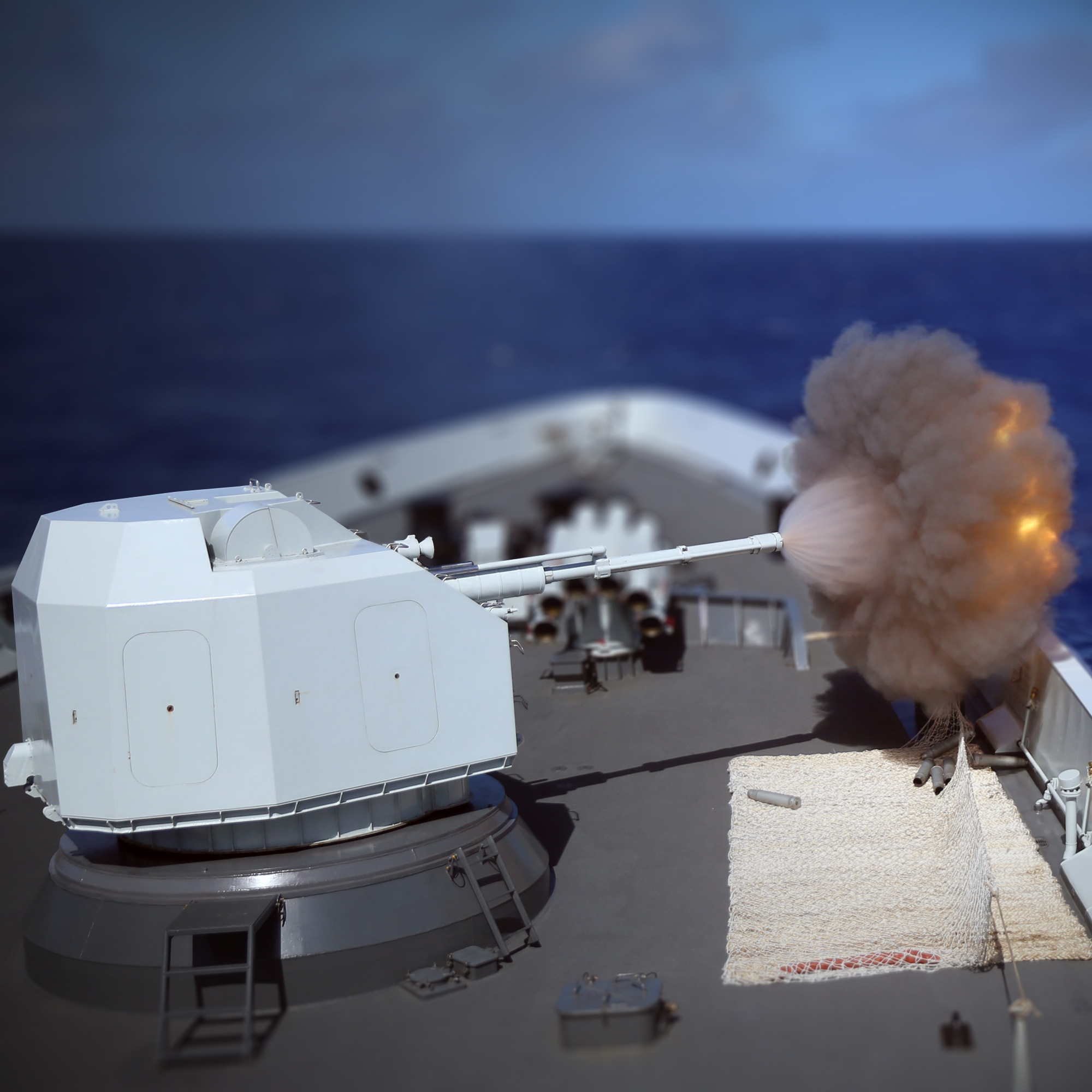
Chinese frigate Hengshui fires its large-caliber H/PJ-26 76 mm main gun during a gunnery exercise during RIMPAC 2016

In the PLAN, current artillery takes the form of large-caliber guns and medium-caliber guns. Large-caliber guns are typically found on destroyers, frigates and corvettes as primary gun. Medium-caliber guns are used as secondary gun on destroyers, frigates and corvettes. Smaller ships, auxiliary ships and small to medium size amphibious warfare ships utilize medium-caliber guns as primary gun. Modern large-caliber guns are multirole and can be used against ships, cruise missiles (including anti-ship cruise missiles), aircraft and shore targets at short range. Modern medium-caliber guns are used for self-defense against the aircraft (including unmanned aerial vehicles), high-speed boats (including unmanned surface vehicles), cruise missiles (including anti-ship cruise missile) at very close range. The increasing use of missiles in surface combat means less use of guns against the large ship targets.

Medium-caliber guns vary in size and power from older swivel-mount 25 mm machine guns to advanced fire-control radar-assisted gun-based close-in weapon systems (gun-based CIWS) and 57 mm rapid-fire anti-aircraft weapons.

=== Current large-caliber artillery systems ===
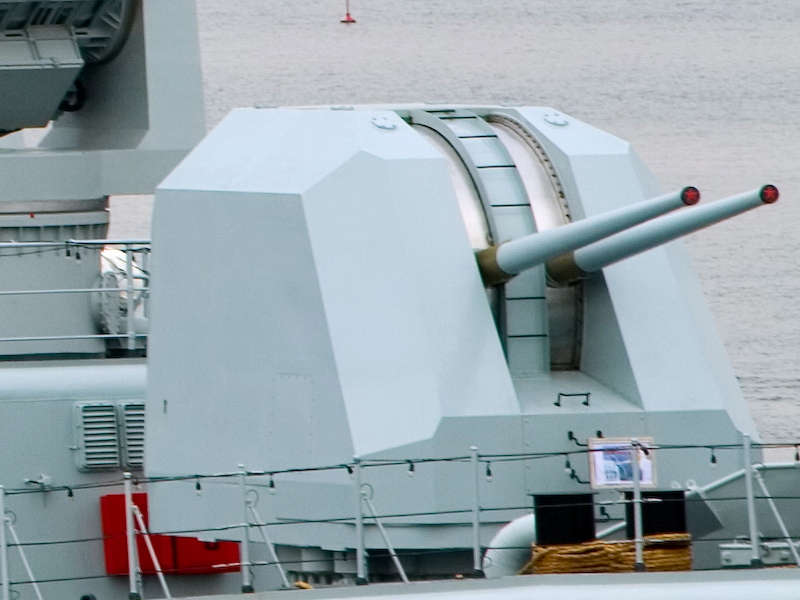
A Dual barrel H/PJ-33B 100 mm gun in Type 053H3 class frigate.

- H/PJ-45 130mm naval gun
- Type 210 and H/PJ87 100/55 automatic single 100 mm enclosed gun mount
- H/PJ-26 automatic single 76 mm enclosed gun mount
- Type 79, Type 79A (H/PJ33A) and H/PJ33B automatic twin 100 mm enclosed gun mount
- Soviet AK–176 automatic single 76 mm enclosed gun mount
- Soviet AK-130 twin 130 mm enclosed gun mount

Most PLAN surface combatants in the class of destroyer,frigate and corvette operate a large-caliber gun (mostly a forward turret, and some ships have an aft turret as well). Modern PLAN large-caliber artillery has been primarily based on Soviet and French designs of 76 mm to 130 mm artillery systems. The Type-76 130 mm twin mount was the main artillery mount on the decommissioned Type 051 destroyers. A more indigenized ship artillery gun system was the Type 79 family dual 100 mm gun (as well as single versions). Latest versions of the PLAN large-caliber guns can be operated with one or few operators or completely automatically guided by radar or optronic aiming. Compared to the previous generation large-caliber guns, modern PLAN guns can achieve accurate fire with high rate of fire. A new indigenous single rapid-fire 100 mm mount, called H/PJ87, is available on the Type 052C destroyers and Type 054B frigates; this is an improve modification of the compact model of the French 100 mm naval gun made by Creusot-Loire.

=== Current medium-caliber artillery systems ===
==== Remote Controlled Weapon Stations (RCWS) ====
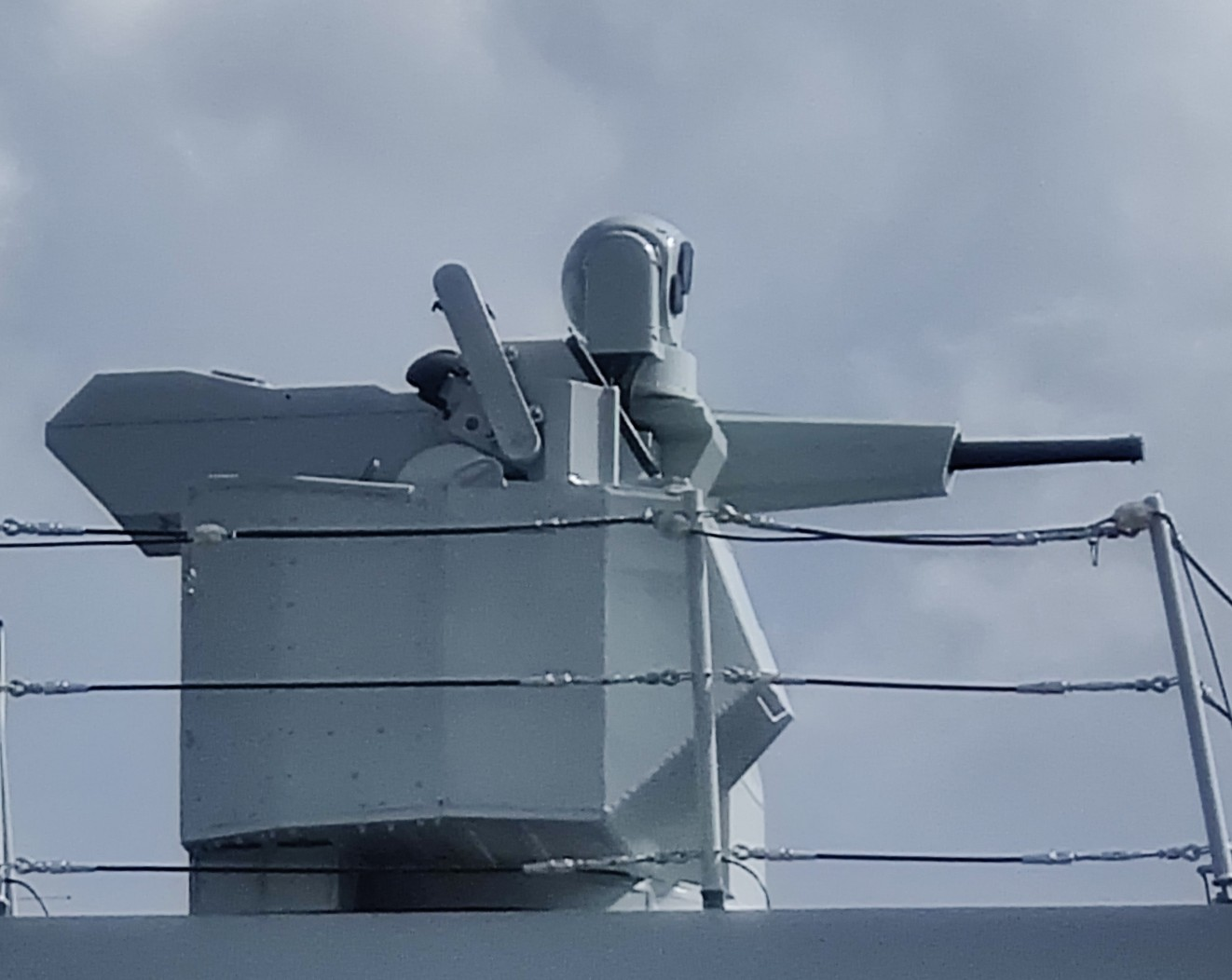
A H/PJ-17 30mm remote controlled weapon station on the Type 680 training ship Qi Jiguang(戚继光, 83) during her visit to Hong Kong.

- ORW-1
- H/PJ-15
- H/PJ-17

==== Other medium-caliber artillery systems ====
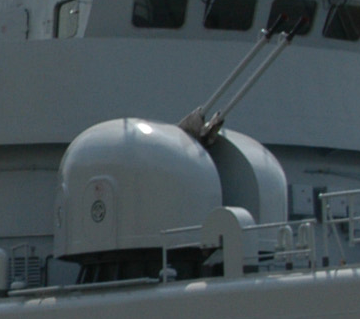
Type 76A 37mm gun

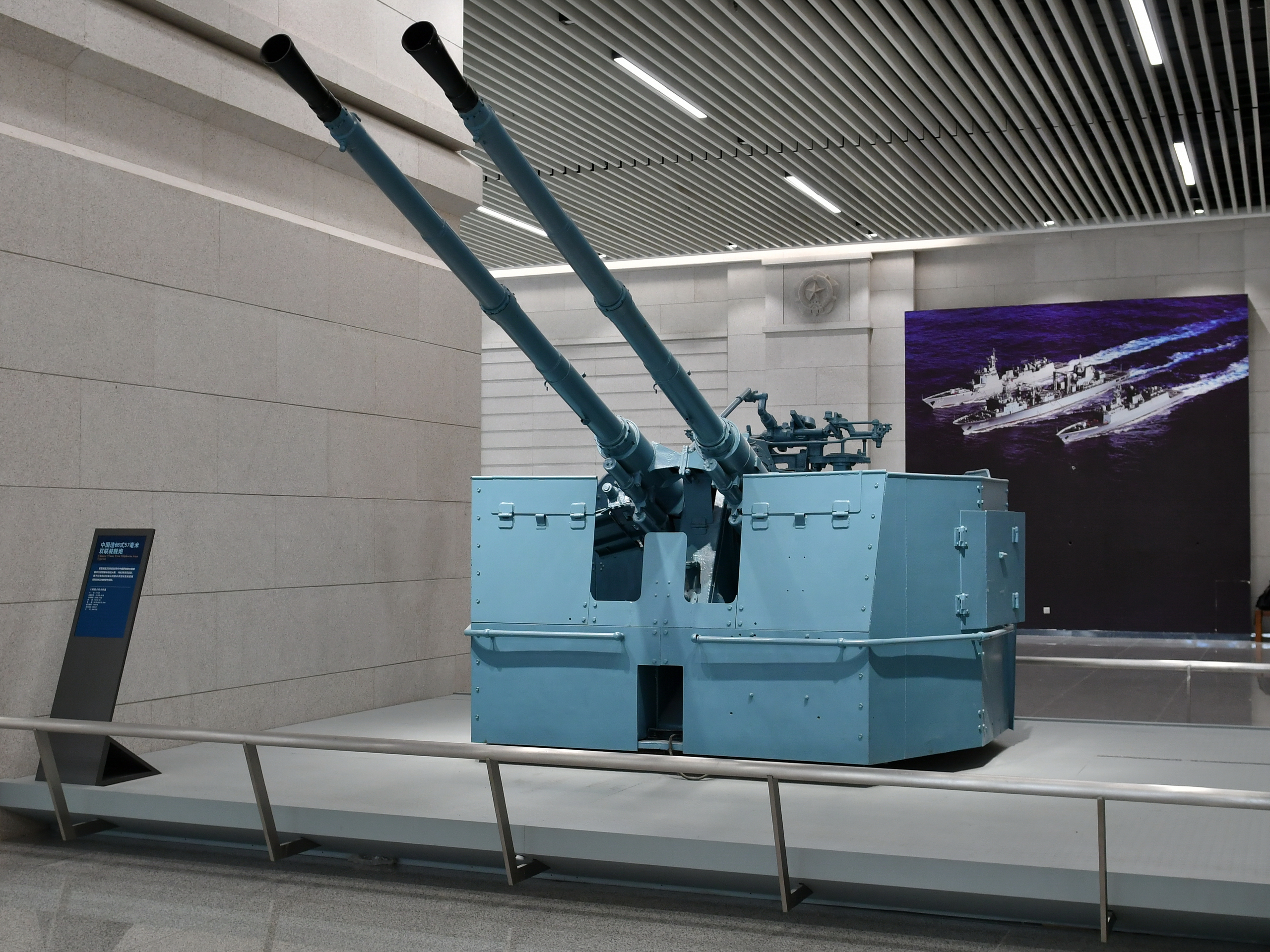
Type 66 57mm twin naval gun at a museum

- Soviet ZIF-31 based twin 57 mm open mount guns: Type 66, Type 76
- Type 59 automatic twin 57 mm open gun mount
- Type 76A (H/PJ76A) automatic twin 37 mm enclosed gun mount
- Type 76F automatic twin 37 mm gun mount
- Type 69 automatic twin 25 mm enclosed gun mount
- Type 61 automatic twin 25 mm open gun mount
- AK-230 (Type 69) twin 30 mm enclosed gun mount
- Type 69 single or twin 14.5 mm heavy machine gun (open mount)
- Single or twin 12.7 mm heavy machine gun (open mount)

All types of medium-caliber artillery remains important to PLAN combatants, but its concept has been radically changed recently. Most new or already commissioned ships before the introduction of the Type 730 CIWS have been installed or upgraded with a fully automatic variant of the 37 mm cannon. This system is known as the Type 76A dual anti-aircraft artillery system (180 rounds per minute engaging at 4,500 m). The Type 76A is a direct descendant of the Type 76 twin 37 mm gun, which in turn, is the successor of Type 61 manual twin 37 mm gun. Although the Type 76 twin 37 mm gun is fully automatic, it has an open turret and thus is subject to harsh environment, which causes reliability problems.

Type 76A twin 37 mm gun was thus developed to solve these problems by introducing an enclosed turret and fire control systems. A fire control radar guides these weapons, and can engage targets in most conditions. There is also an optronic device that enables manual and optical aiming. The Type 76F is a Type 76A system with simplified fire control system, which has the electrooptic system but not the radar. Also, there is a console for one human operator inside the gun mount for local manual control, though the gun can be fully automated. Unlike the old manual mounts that require a full crew of men to steer, aim, load, and fire the weapon, the Type 76F requires only one operator to aim the system. In addition to the 37 mm guns, a number of Russian AK-230 were also purchased and reverse engineered (as Type 69) for small boats.

The 25 mm Type 61 (Chinese version of the Soviet 2M-3) is a one-man operated weapon. Type-61 25 mm cannon systems (800 rounds per minute at 2,500 m) and Type-66 57 mm (120 rounds per minute at 12,000 m) are manually mounted. These remain active on older smaller vessels, landing ships and auxiliary ships. Machine guns such as the 12.7 mm and 14.5 mm are also classified as automatic weapons; being widely operated as short-range self-defense weapons on most amphibious craft. The majority of Chinese naval auxiliary ships possess manually or remotely operated anti-aircraft or dual-purpose guns, in contrast to the majority of Western navies, which have few or no armaments on board their auxiliaries.

=== Artillery systems no longer in use ===
- Type 76 twin 130 mm enclosed gun mount
- Soviet 130/58 M1957 twin 130 mm enclosed gun mount
- Soviet 130/50 M1936 130 mm semi-enclosed gun mount
- French Cresusot-Loire Compact 100 mm gun mount
- Soviet 100/56 Bu-34 single 100 mm semi-enclosed gun mount
- Type 76 automatic twin 37 mm open gun mount
- Type 65 semi-automatic water-cooled twin 37 mm open gun mount
- Type 63 automatic twin 37 mm open gun mount
- Type 61 semi-automatic air-cooled twin 37 mm open gun mount
- Soviet Bu-11 (Type 63) manual twin 37 mm open gun mount
- Soviet 2M-8 (Type 61) manual twin 25 mm open gun mount

The most commonly carried medium-caliber artillery system in most indigenous ships was the 37 mm anti-aircraft artillery (Type-61/76). This is a manually operated gun, with a gun crew on an open mount. The 37 mm Type 61 was carried by most Chinese surface combatants, ranging from the small Shanghai and Hainan coastal combat vessels to the largest combatants of the Luda and Jianghu class. These guns are highly limited—they can be operated only in clear weather conditions and are effective only in daylight conditions since they lack radar coordination or any form of automatic or autonomous targeting. They are, however, economical and highly reliable. Their firepower has been effectively utilized not only against aircraft but also against surface and land targets.

The old manually operated Type-61 37 mm weapon is gradually phased out in favor of automatic weaponry. This system like is almost totally ineffective against modern jet aircraft and incoming missiles. However it has been combat proven to be effective against enemy shipping, particularly in the Sino-Vietnamese naval battle near the Spratley Islands on several occasions.

== Decoys and MLRS ==
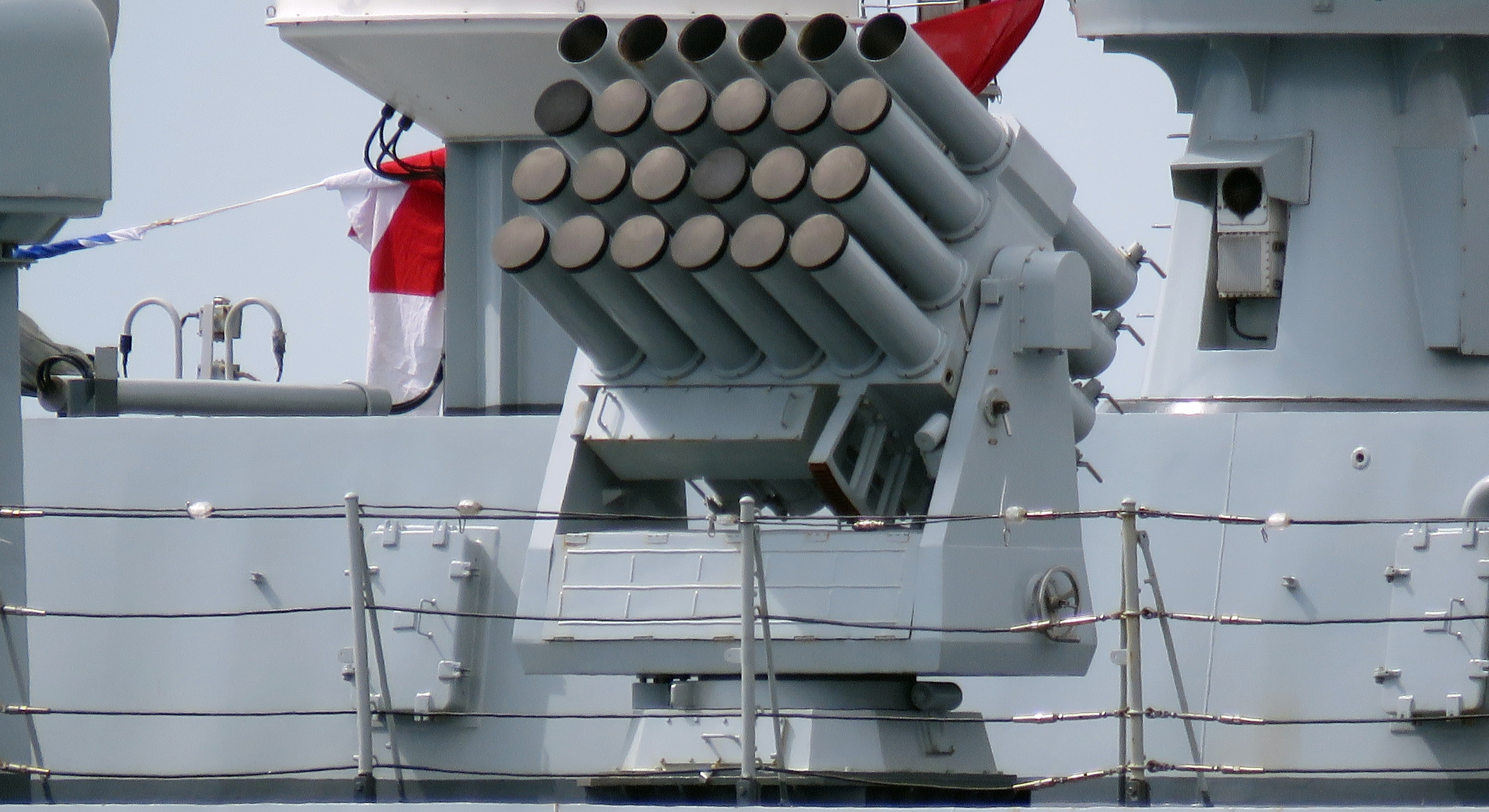
Type 726-4 decoy launchers of the Type 054A frigate Handan (579)

The Type 726 is a series of digital multi-barrel decoy launcher. It fires multiple types of expendable counternmeasures including passive counternmeasures (flares and chaff) and also carry active payloads including small decoys with active radiofrequency jammers.

A single Type-053H frigate Changsha (hull 516), now decommissioned, was modified to carry multiple-rocket launchers (MLRS). In 2002, Changsha was converted to a naval gunfire support ship for amphibious assault bombardment, replacing its anti-ship missiles and anti-aircraft armament with 5 rocket launchers with 50 tubes each. The rockets are of 122 mm caliber, and are based on the Type 89 system, which is itself quite similar to the Soviet BM-21 rocket system. The 122 mm rockets are launched from a stabilized launcher, meaning that even if the ship is affected by wave motion, the launcher itself will be stabilized. The rockets have a range of up to 40 km, and can achieve reasonable accuracy in fire. This installation was an experiment by the PLAN to make use of older warship designs, by turning them into cost-effective shore bombardment platforms.

== Combat data systems ==
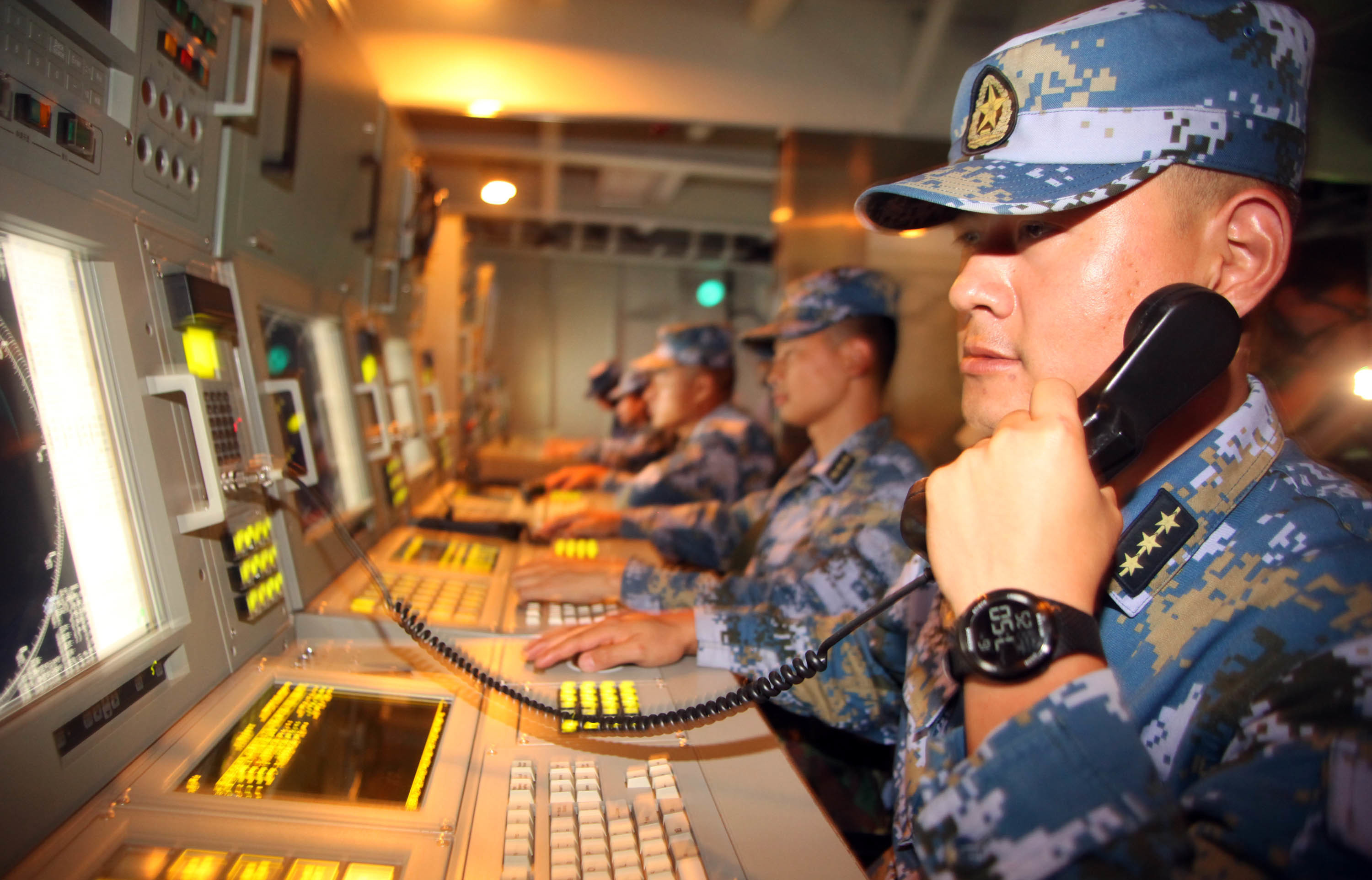
Weapon control station of Chinese Navy Ship Hengshui (572)

A combat data system (or combat management system, CDS/CMS) is considered a force multiplier and another revolution of military affairs after World War II, because CDS automates C4I system by integrating information gathered by separate ship-borne sensors into a coherent overall picture, and assisting decision making, and thus boosting the war-fighting capability of ships equipped with such system. However, until the 1980s, Chinese naval vessels has yet to be equipped with such systems. The first combat data system for Chinese navy was indigenous, and subsequent systems trace their origin from Italian and French systems purchased. Three western combat data systems were known to be purchased by China, including British Racal Marine Radar CTC-1629, Italian Alenia SADOC 2, and French Thomson-CSF TAVITAC. The following Chinese combat systems have been identified:

- Type 673-I/Poseidon-1
- Type 673-II Poseidon-2/ZKJ-I
- Poseidon-3/ZKJ-II
- Poseidon-4/ZKJ-3
- CCS-1 (For export only)
- ZKJ-4
- ZKJ-4A
- ZKJ-4AG
- ZKJ-4B
- ZKJ-4BII
- ZKJ-5
- ZKJ-1
- ZKT-1A
- ZKT-1B
- ZBJ-1
- ZBJ-1A
- ZBJ-2

== Radars ==
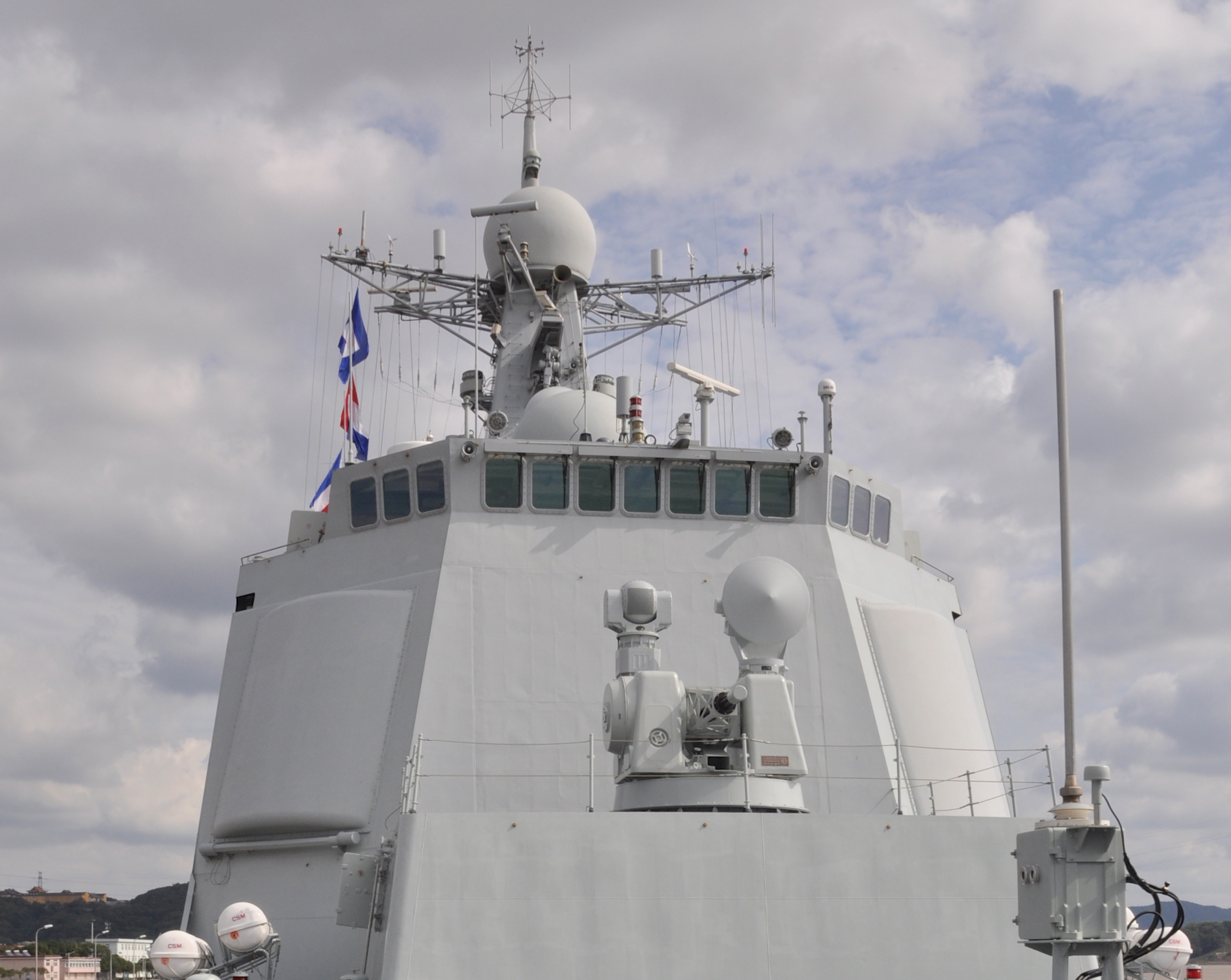
Two of the four Type 346 radar panels on the superstructure of a Type 052C destroyer

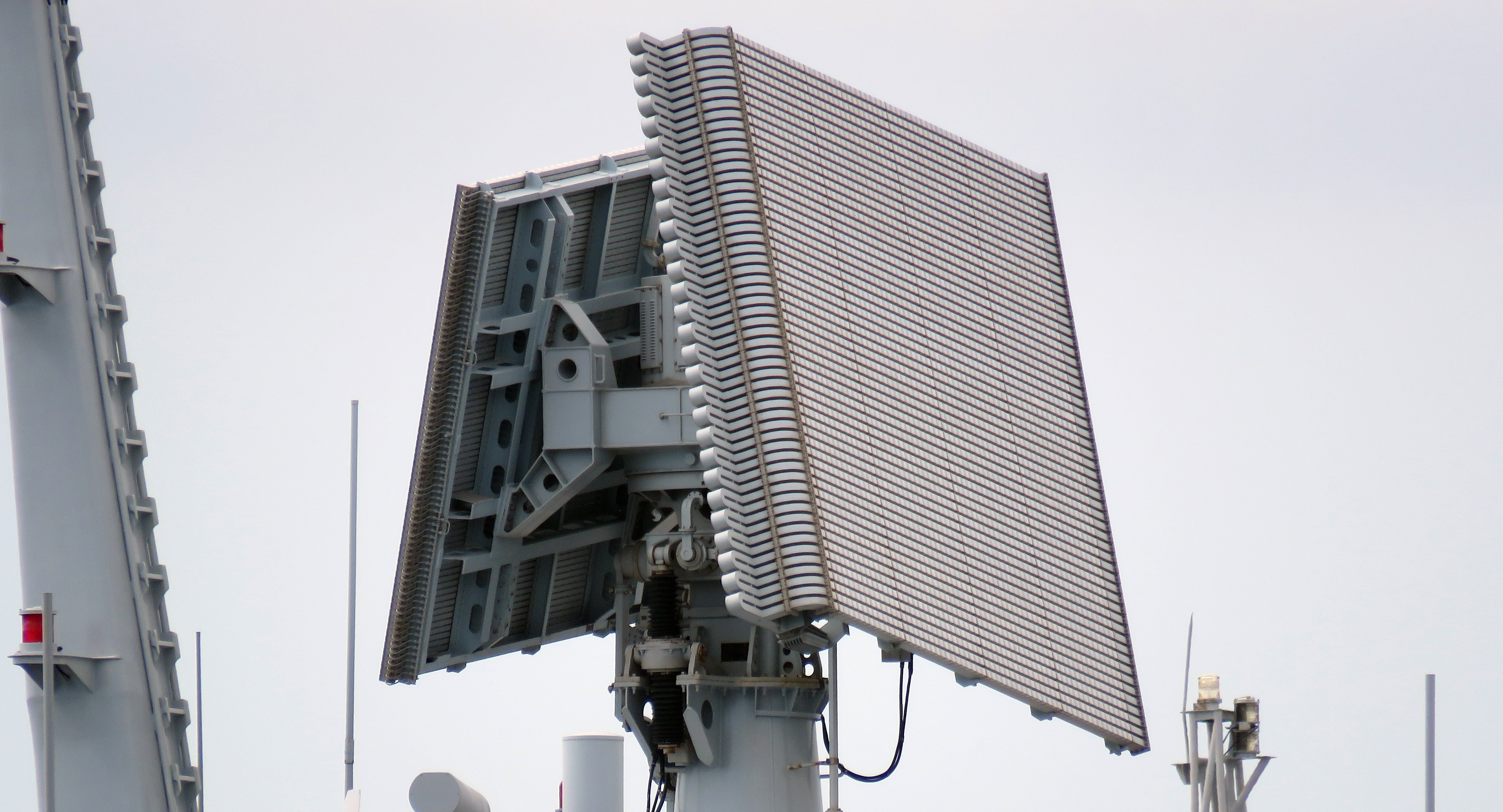
Type 382 installed on a Type 054A frigate

- Type 341 Radar 'RICE LAMP' fire control radar
- Type 342 Radar 'FOG LAMP' fire control radar
- Type 343 Radar 'WASPHEAD/SUN VISOR' fire control radar
- Type 344 Radar fire control radar
- Type 345 Radar fire control radar
- Type 346 radar surveillance radar
- Type 347 Radar 'RICE BOWL' fire control radar
- Type 348 Radar fire control radar
- Type 349 radar fire control radar
- Type 351 Radar 'POT HEAD' surface search radar
- Type 352 Radar 'SQUARE TIE' naval surface search radar
- Type 354 Radar 'EYE SHIELD' air/surface search
- Type 360 radar air/surface search radar
- Type 364 Radar air/surface search radar
- Type 366 radar over-the-horizon air/surface search radar
- Type 381 Radar 'RICE SCREEN' air/surface search radar
- Type 382 Radar air/surface search radar
- Type 512 Radar navigational/surface search radar
- Type 514 Radar air search radar
- Type 515 Radar 'BEAN/PEA STICK'air/surface search radar
- Type 517 Radar 'KNIFE REST' air/surface search
- Type 518 Radar air search radar
- Type 751 Radar navigation radar
- Type 752 Radar navigation radar
- Type 753 Radar navigation radar
- Type 756 Radar navigation radar
- Type 757 Radar navigation radar

== Sonars ==
Chinese sonar systems were initially based on Soviet supplied system, and during the 1980s, some western sonars were also imported, including Italian DE-1160, French DUBV23/43, SS-12, HS-312 etc. Domestic Chinese sonars includes:

SJD-1
H/SJD-1 sonar is an indigenously developed bow mounted sonar, first of its kind in China. Initial proposal of adopting Soviet Tamir-11(MG-11, NATO reporting name Stag Hoof) search light sonar was rejected, because it was not considered adequate enough due to its single beam search capability, which means the low speed of search cycle would easily lose targets. A more capable indigenous Chinese sonar was ordered to be developed, with Mr. Huo Guozheng (霍国正) named as the general designer. The resulting indigenous Chinese domestic sonar was SJD-1 low frequency (LF), high power, large aperture sonar with a cylindrical array (designated as Type 601 sonar array), which was accepted into service after eleven major trials at the sea. Type 601 sonar array of SJD-1 sonar has a diameter of 2 m, height of 1 m and weight of 4 tons, and the range is in excess of 6 nautical miles (nm), more than twice the range of Soviet Tamir/MG-11 search light sonar originally proposed. SJD-1 sonar was jointly developed by 706th Research Institute, 726th & 461th Factories, and it is the first bow mounted sonar adopted by Chinese navy. SJD-1 is frequently confused with its successor SJD-2, more commonly referred as SJD-II, whose design started in the 1970s, but was not completed until the 1980s due to major redesign. SJD-1 sonar was installed on Luda class destroyers and subsequently upgraded to SJD-2 in the 1980s.

SJD-N
It was discovered that SJD-1 sonar cannot provide accurate locations of targets, and the error was too great to be adequate enough to provide fire solutions to onboard ASW weapons. Therefore, the design of Type 051D incorporated an additional high frequency (HF) active attack sonar designated as SJD-N (with Type 675 sonar transducer array) to provide fire solutions, and this attack sonar was subsequently fitted on all Luda class ships. SJD-N was subsequently upgraded to SJD-4 standards.

SJD-2
H/SJD-2 sonar, more commonly known as SJD-II, whose design started in the 1970s, but was not completed until the 1980s due to major redesign, is frequently confused with its successor SJD-1. SJD-2 is part of the effort (the other part being SJD-4) to improve the ASW capability of steam powered Chinese warships by incorporating Italian DE-1164 sonar technology. DE-1164 consists of 2 subsystems using the same electrical cabinet, DE-1160 hull mounted sonar (HMS, with a maximum range around 20 km) and DE-1163 variable depth sonar (VDS, with a maximum range in excess of 50 km). DE-1164 is the first sonar in Chinese service to have integrated the HMS & VDS. ED-1164 was installed on Type 051 destroyer for evaluation.

Trials revealed that the performance of DE-1164 sonar was disappointing, with a huge gap between the actual performance and what was specified in documents. However, this was not due to sonar, but the ship itself. Due to the inherent flaws of an old design, the ship is not an ideal ASW platform for advanced ASW system. The steam propulsion system proved to be the major hindrance preventing DE-1164 reaching its full potential. The noise and vibration generated by the steam boilers simply created too much interference with the sensitive sonar that it could only reach its full potential at very low speed. However, at such low speed, target would easily evade and escape Luda's attempt to attack. Test result led to two attempts to address the issue going in parallel: one of them was to upgrade SJD-1 with foreign technologies, and an addition of an attack sonar SJD-4. SJD-2 is thus an upgrade package for older steam-powered warships.

SJD-3
H/SJD-3 sonar is the Chinese development of Soviet Tamir-11(MG-11) search light sonar. SJD-3 hull mounted sonar differs from Soviet MG-11 in that instead of being fixed to the hull like the original MG-11, SJD-3 has a telescoping arm, so when not in use, the sonar is stored in the hull, and when deployed, the sonar is lowered into water several metres below the hull, thus increased detection range by avoiding baffles generated by the hull.

SJD-4
H/SJD-4 sonar resulted in the same experience of evaluation Italian DE-1164 sonar, which led to the development of SJD-2, the improvement of SJD-1. SJD-4, in turn, is the corresponding upgrade of SJD-N, utilizing the technologies of DE-1164.

SJD-5
H/SJD-5 is the Chinese development of Soviet Tamir/MG-11, with transistors replacing vacuum tubes in the original Soviet MG-11, thus reduced size and weight and increase reliability. SJD-5 sonar has several derivatives, including EH-5, with integrated circuits replacing transistors, which further developed into Echo Type 5, adopting LSIC technology. The latest member is SJD-5A, with VLSIC technology.

SJD-7
H/SJD-7 is the Chinese development of Italian DE-1164 sonar, with additional noise cancellation and vibration reduction measures so that it can be used on older steam powered warship, whose steam propulsion system generates much greater noise and vibration than diesel and gas turbine propulsion system.

SJD-9
H/SJD-9 is the Chinese development of French DUBV23/43 hull mounted/VDS sonar system, incorporating same additional noise cancellation and vibration reduction measures for installation on steam powered warships.

ESS-1/2
ESS-1 sonar and ESS-2 sonar are Chinese VDS and hull mounted sonars (HMS) developed from similar western counterparts. The origin of ESS-1 VDS and ESS-2 hull mounted sonar are subject to debate due to lack of official information, with some sources claim that ESS-2/1 are the Chinese version of DE-1160/1162 HMS/VDS, while others claim that it is the Chinese version of DUBV-23/43 HMS/VDS. Since the Italian and French sonars have similar performance (20 km for HMS, and 50 km for VDS), it is difficult to determine which is which, since official Chinese governmental sources only confirms the 20/50 km ranges for HMS/VDS. ESS-2 sonar has bearing accuracy of 1 degree and like its predecessors SJD-1/2, it has a cylindrical transducer.

SO-7H
SO-7H sonar is the Chinese version of French DUBA 25 sonar. As with SJD-7/9, SO-7H also incorporates additional vibration and noise reduction measures for upgrading older steam powered warships in Chinese navy.

SJG-206
H/SJG-206 is low frequency towed array sonar, the first towed sonar in China. Developed by China Shipbuilding Industry Corporation, it won second place in National Science & Technology Advancement Award in 2003, and it equips many Chinese primary surface combatants.

TLAS-1
TLAS-1 sonar is the first Chinese towed array with a range of up to 45 km. This passive low frequency sonar is able to simultaneously tracking 5 targets, with a bearing accuracy of 4 degrees, and it shares the same operator console as ESS-2 HMS. This is a light towed system designed for smaller surface combatants.

SJG-208
H/SJG-208 is a towed sonar used by Chinese hydrographic and oceanographic survey ships, entered service in 1997, and its general designer is Mr. Li Qihu (李启虎), who is also the general designer of H/SQG-4 and H/SJG-206 sonars, and deputy general designer of H/SQG-207 sonar.

SQG-4
H/SQG-4 passive ranging sonar is also known as Type 204 sonar, it can be either used as part of H/SQZ-262 integrated sonar system, or as an independent system. Started in 1987, SQG-4 incorporated western technologies, namely French Thomson-CSF DUUX-5, and it deploys three arrays on each side of the submarine.

SQZ-262
H/SQZ-262 sonar is a fully digitized, integrated submarine sonar designed by Acoustic Research Institute of Chinese Academy of Sciences. Three versions of H/SQZ-262 was developed, with SQZ-262A replacing Type 105 sonar on Type 033 class submarine, SQZ-262B replacing Type 603 & 604 sonars on Han class and Xia class nuclear submarine, and SQZ-262C installed on Type 035G Ming class submarine.

SQG-207
H/SQG-207 flank array is a flank sonar newly developed by 715th Research Institute, first equipped Chinese nuclear submarine, and then conventional submarines during refits, it is the first flank sonar in China.

Synthetic Aperture Sonar (SAS)
Chinese synthetic aperture sonar (CSAS) is a SAS developed by a team led by Acoustic Research Institute of Chinese Academy of Sciences, partnered with the 715th Research Institute of China Shipbuilding Industry Corporation. The program first begun in Jul 1997 one of the 863 Programs, and the general designer of CSAS was Chinese academician of sciences Mr. Li Qihu (李启虎), also the general designer of H/SQZ-262 sonar. In comparison to imported SHADOWS SAS developed by French firm IXBLUE, CSAS has higher resolutions: the model of CSAS that utilizes both the medium and low frequencies has a resolution of 0.1 m, as opposed to 0.15 m of SHADOWS SAS. The model of CSAS that utilizes high frequency has a highest resolution to 5 cm x 3.75 cm.

SAS for AUV
China has also developed a miniature SAS for autonomous underwater vehicles(AUVs). Developed by the Information and Communication Engineering Research Institute of Zhejiang University as part of one of the Project 985 programs, the general designer of Chinese SAS for AUV is Professor Mr. Xu Wen (徐文) of Zhejiang University.

XT02WR01
XT02WR01 sonar is a diver detection sonar (DDS) developed by (Beijing) New Source Yongtai Electro-optics Science and Technologies Development Co. Ltd. (北京新源永泰光电科技发展有限责任公司) in Beijing. The system can cover up to 150 hectares of area, with an effective range against a diver at 400 to 700 m (w/ errors of 0.5 m in distance, 15 m in bearing). The size of the system (wet end) is very compact, weight less than 50 kg, with a diameter of 0.5 m and a height of 0.65 m. The wet end only need 200 W of power, same as an ordinary household television, with 220 V power source. The wet end of XT02WR01 sonar can be deployed in a depth up to 40 m deep and can operate in sea state 4 continuously for 3 years, and the entire system can be fully autonomous, operating without any human intervention. The dry end of XT02WR01 sonar system has numerous options based on customer demands, linked to the wet end via waterproof fiber-optics cables.

Tronka
Tronka sonar is a DDS jointly developed by Ukraine and China. The systems weigh 415 kg (115 kg for wet end, 300 for dry end), and can be deployed in a depth up to 20 m. The effective range is 0.5 km, with an accuracy of 1.5% in range, 2 degrees in azimuth. The height of the wet end is 1.5 m, and the service life of the system is 10 years.

Underwater Security System
Underwater Security System (USS) is an indigenous Chinese nonlethal diver repellant system developed domestically by a joint team of Institute of Acoustics (中科院声学所) of Chinese Academy of Sciences (CAS), Shanghai Ship & Shipping Research Institute (上海船舶运输科学研究所) of China Shipping Group, and Xi’an (Research) Institute of Optics and Precision Mechanics (西安光学精密机械研究所) of CAS. The general designer of USS is Mr.Xu Feng (许枫, Jun 1969 -). The detection subsystem of USS consists of both the stationary and mobile sonars. USS has been first deployed in 2008 Olympic games in Chinese port cities hosting water sports, and has since been adopted subsequently by Chinese law enforcement, para-military and military establishments.

Harbor Underwater Frogmen Detection System
Harbor Underwater Frogmen Detection System (HUFDS) is a DDS system actively marketed in China by its developer, Beijing Time Frequency Technology Co., Ltd (北京泰富坤科技有限公司) in Beijing.

SGP
SGP side scan sonar (SSS) is a family of SSS developed by South China University of Technology led by the general designer Mr. Lin Zhenbiao (林振镳), and a total of 3 generations of SGP SSS has been developed since program first begun in 1971, including SGP-I/II/III (SGP-1/2/3), with SGP-3 being successfully used in mine detection. The predecessor of SGP-3, the SGP-1 SSS works at two frequencies, 160-190 kHz and 25-30 kHz.

CS-1
CS-1 is a side scan sonar developed by Institute of Acoustics (中科院声学所) of Chinese Academy of Sciences (CAS). CS-1 system consists of computer-based sonar processor, the sonar receiver board, data acquisition board, extended I/O interface board, thermal line scan recorder, tow-fish, tow cable and winch etc. CS-1 is deployed for survey missions.

Portable SSS
Portable side scan sonar is developed by Institute of Acoustics (中科院声学所) of Chinese Academy of Sciences (CAS), based on experience gained from CS-1 SSS developed by the same team. Portable SSS is primarily designed as a rapid deployment system that can be readily installed on surface platform, so that it would complement larger systems such as CS-1 which required more dedicated platform. The maximum range is 200 meter, and maximum working depth is 100 meter, highest resolution is 0.5 degree, diameter is 0.1 meter, working frequency is 200 kHz and the total system weight is less than 30 kg.

HRBSSS
HRBSSS stands for High Resolution Bathymetric Side Scan Sonar, and it is jointly developed by Institute of Acoustics (中科院声学所) of Chinese Academy of Sciences (CAS) and Teledyne RD Instruments (RDI) @ Shanghai. The resolution is 5 cm, working frequency is 150 kHz, and range is 2 x 400 m, maximum working depth is up to 6000 m, and HRBSSS can track multiple targets simultaneously.

SQX-1
H/SQX-1 sonar is a communication sonar for underwater communications, with the transducer reportedly designed as Type 063.

SQC-1
H/SQC-1 sonar (with transducer designated as Type 604) is a passive sonar installed on first generation Chinese nuclear submarines when they were first launched, and it is no longer in service, replaced by H/SQZ-262B.

SQZ-3
H/SQZ-3 sonar (with transducer designated as Type 603) is an active sonar installed on first generation Chinese nuclear submarines when they were first launched, and it is no longer in service, replaced by H/SQZ-262B.

SQZ-D
H/SQZ-D sonar (with transducer designated as Type 105) is a sonar for older generations of diesel submarines and it is no longer in service, being replaced by H/SQZ-262A. The performance of SQZ is almost identical to the original Soviet sonar it was developed from, except the sector of scan, which is increased by 15 degrees. The volume and weight is also decreased considerably when the original vacuum tubes of the original Soviet sonar (Tamir 5L, NATO reporting name: Perch Gill) was replaced by transistors and integrated circuits.

SQC-1
H/SQC-1 reconnaissance sonar is no longer in service when its functions can be performed as part of that of H/SQZ-262 sonar.

Type 801
Type 801 sonar is a Chinese development of Soviet MARS-24 sonar for diesel submarines. Type 801 provide azimuth of targets and it is a passive system. The only difference between Type 801 sonar and its predecessor MARS-24 sonar is that there are 24 transducer elements for Type 801 as opposed to 12 in the original MARS 24, so the Chinese sonar had better accuracy.

SQG-2
H/SQG-2 sonar is the first domestically developed indigenous Chinese passive ranging sonar, developed to complement Type 801 passive sonar, which could only provide azimuth, but not ranging. SQG-2 is a ranging only sonar that is no longer in service, being replaced by more advanced development.

SQZ-1
H/SQZ-1 sonar is an integrated sonar system that integrates Type 801, SQC-1, SQG-2 and SQZ-D sonars so the overall combat effectiveness is improved, in comparison to the old practice of each sonar working separately and info obtained from each individual system must be manually interpreted to form an overall picture. SQZ-1 is no longer in service and has been replaced by SQZ-262 sonar.

== Diver propulsion vehicles ==
All confirmed Diver propulsion vehicles (DPVs) in Chinese service are developed by the Kunming Wuwei Science & Technology Trade Co., Ltd at Kunming, a solely owned subsidiary of Kunming 705th (Research) Institute Science & Technology Development Co. (昆明七零五所科技发展总公司) at Kunming, which in turn, is a company wholly owned by the 705th Research Institute (headquartered in Xi'an) of the China Shipbuilding Industry Corporation. All DPV/SDVs (swimmer transportation devices) fielded by this contractor are developed by the design team with the following members: Liu Ning (刘宁), You Yun (犹云), Jin Zhongxian (金仲贤), Chen Haizhen (陈海珍), and Zhang Chun (张春). A total of 4 DPVs have been identified in Chinese naval service:

QY18 DPV
One man DPV/SDV weighing < 20 kg. Length: 0.8 m, diameter: 0.385 m, speed: 2 kn, endurance: > 1 hr, depth: 40 m.

QY40 DPV
One man DPV/SDV weighing < 40 kg. Length: 1.2 m, diameter: 0.32 m, speed: 2 kn, endurance: > 1.5 hr, depth: 40 m.

QX50 DPV
One man DPV/SDV weighing < 50 kg. Length: 1.6 m, diameter: 0.23 m, speed: 2 kn, endurance: > 2 hr, depth: 40 m.

QJY-001 DPV
Two man DPV weighing < 90 kg. Length: < 2.3 m, diameter: < 0.53 m, max speed: 4 m/s, cruise speed: 2.7 kn for 1 person, 2 kn for 2 people, endurance: > 9 km @ 2 kn, depth: 30 m, sea state: 3.

In addition to the DPVs currently in the Chinese naval inventory, Glory International Group Ltd in Beijing is also marketing two of its DPVs, (GL602 and GL603), to the Chinese military.

== Unmanned underwater vehicles (UUVs) ==
The following unmanned underwater vehicle(UUV)s have been confirmed in Chinese service:

- 8A4 ROUVs
- RECON-IV ROUVs
- 7B8 ROUVs
- Goldfish class ROUVs
- HR-01 ROUV
- HR-02 ROUV
- JH-01 ROUV
- SJT-5 ROUV
- SJT-10 ROUV
- SJT-40 ROUV
- Sea Dragon-I ROUV
- Sea Dragon-II ROUV
- Arctic class ARV
- Explorer AUV
- WZODA AUV
- CR-01 AUV
- CR-01A AUV
- CR-02 AUV
- Intelligent Water class AUV
- Submerged Dragon 1 AUV

== Future weapons systems ==
The current quantity and capability of PLAN ships and weaponry has improved significantly. Future PLAN weapon systems could include new versions of land attack cruise missiles, stealthy hypersonic missiles, armed ship-launched UAVs, anti radiation missiles, land based anti-ship ballistic missiles, EMP bombs, long-range artillery systems, super-speed torpedoes, improved mines and laser weapons.
