= TE1 =

TE1, TE-1 or TE.1 may refer to:

== Aircraft ==
- Albert TE.1, a French sport aircraft
- Eklund TE-1, a Finnish sport aircraft
- Temco TE-1 Buckaroo, an American military trainer aircraft

== Other uses ==
- TE1, a Soviet copy of the American locomotive ALCO RSD-1
- Te-1 rocket propelled mine, a Chinese naval mine
- (12305) 1991 TE1, a minor planet
- Woodlands North MRT station, Singapore
