= Type 514 Radar =

Chinese 2-D air search radar

Type 514 radar is a Chinese 2-D air search radar in service with both Chinese Ground Force (PLAGF) and Chinese navy (PLAN). Type 514 radar is a land based, mobile 2-D air defense radar developed from earlier Type 513. The radar has been retired from active service, being replaced by more advanced radars such as Type 354 on PLAN destroyers and frigates.

When China built/converted its first generation frigates Type 6601 in the 1960s, domestic Chinese diesel engines to meet military standard were not ready, so civilian diesel engines had to be used, but civilian diesel engines were heavier and bulkier, especially in terms of height. Compounded with the smaller size of the frigate, the land-based Type 515 radar adopted for naval use onboard Type 051 destroyers was too big to be installed on smaller frigates, so an alternative had to be sought. Type 514 mobile 2-D air search radar already in service with PLANAF was more compact than Type 515, and was thus selected as an emergence stopgap measure until more advanced radar became available for Chinese frigates urgently needed air defense radars at the time. Development of the naval version of Type 514 radar begun in September 1964, and because it was based on the matured land-based version, development was very smooth and completed in the first half of the following year. In July 1965, the radar entered series production and delivered to PLAN. However, Type 514 was only aboard these early Chinese frigates for a very short period of time, when Type 354 entered series production in April 1974, it soon replaced all Type 514 radars on Chinese ships.

== See also ==
- Chinese radars
- Naval Weaponry of the People's Liberation Army Navy
