= Type 757 Radar =

Chinese navigational radar

Type 757 radar is a Chinese navigational radar designed for small boats such as Chinese fishing boats and small auxiliary vessels of the Chinese navy. Developed by the Shanghai 4th Radio Factory in the early 1980s. A total of 657 was produced by the end of 1990s, and the radar earned two awards, the first was in 1984 for municipal quality and ministry award, and the second time in 1985 for national award. The range of this small radar is 24 nautical miles.

== See also ==
- Chinese radars
- Naval Weaponry of the People's Liberation Army Navy
