= Type 512 Radar =

Retired naval radar for the Chinese navy

The Type 512 radar was a Chinese license-produced Soviet Zarnitsa naval radar that has been withdrawn from service in Chinese navy.

The radar was produced by the State Factory N. 720 in Nanjing between November 1955 to April 1957. It operated as a surface search and navigational radar on board naval vessel. It was the only naval radar produced by China at the time. Type 512 radar is mainly installed on small vessels such as torpedo boats, missile boats, or gunboats, and some Chinese naval auxiliaries. The 80-kW radar operates at S-band and has an effective range of 20 km. Type 512 has been replaced on the 1980s for more advanced radars, after more than three decades of service in the Chinese navy.

== See also ==
- Chinese radars
- Naval Weaponry of the People's Liberation Army Navy
