= Type 751 Radar =

Type 751 radar is a Chinese navigational radar used by Chinese merchant ships and ships of Chinese navy, and it is the first navigational radar developed by Shanghai 4th Radio Factory, which subsequently also developed many other Chinese navigational radars after this humble beginning. Development begun in October 1963, with a design team led by the deputy general engineer Mr. Zhang Yuan-Zhen (张元震) and Engineer Gu Xie-Xiang (顾燮祥). First sample was completed by the end of 1964, and in September 1965, the radar was installed on the Chinese naval ship Luoyang (ex-HMAS Bendigo (J187)).

The original antenna of Type 751 radar was parabolic, and later a slotted array was also developed in the later production stage. The maximum range is 48 nautical miles, and it utilizes a 31 cm display. The radar can be integrated to electronic support measures and IFF. To support the urgent production need, Qingdao 3rd Radio Factory was also tasked with the production. By the end of production run in June 1983, 1117 sets have been produced by Shanghai 4th Radio Factory and another 228 were produced by Qingdao 3rd Radio Factory. Type 751 radar utilized vacuum tubes.

== See also ==
- Chinese radars
- Naval Weaponry of the People's Liberation Army Navy
