= Type 756 Radar =

Type 756 radar is a Chinese navigational radar developed in the 1970s by Shanghai 4th Radio Factory. Type 756 radar is a dual band radar that utilizes S and X bands, and the utilization of S-band on the navigational radar is the first in China. Type 756 radar is used by both Chinese merchant ships and ships of Chinese navy. The solid state radar digitally displays range and bearing on large display and the maximum range is 96 nautical miles.

== See also ==
- Chinese radars
- Naval Weaponry of the People's Liberation Army Navy
