= Type 752 Radar =

Type 752 radar is a Chinese navigational radar used by Chinese merchant ships and ships of the Chinese navy. Developed by Shanghai 4th Radio Factory in the mid-1960s, it's the first Chinese navigational radar that utilizes transistors. The only vacuum tubes used in this radar system were in the transmitter and display. Development began in 1965 and was completed in the following year. Om 1969, an improved version Type 752-Jia (752甲) was developed. Type 752 radar utilizes a slotted array antenna, which replaced the parabolic antenna previously used on earlier radars and the maximum range is 48 nautical miles. In addition to navigation and surface search, Type 762 onboard Chinese naval vessels is also used as low altitude surveillance radar. In addition to Shanghai 4th Radio Factory, Type 752 radar is also manufactured by Shanghai 101st factory and by the end of 1990s, a total of 1705 were produced.

== See also ==
- Chinese radars
- Naval Weaponry of the People's Liberation Army Navy
