= H/PJ-17 =

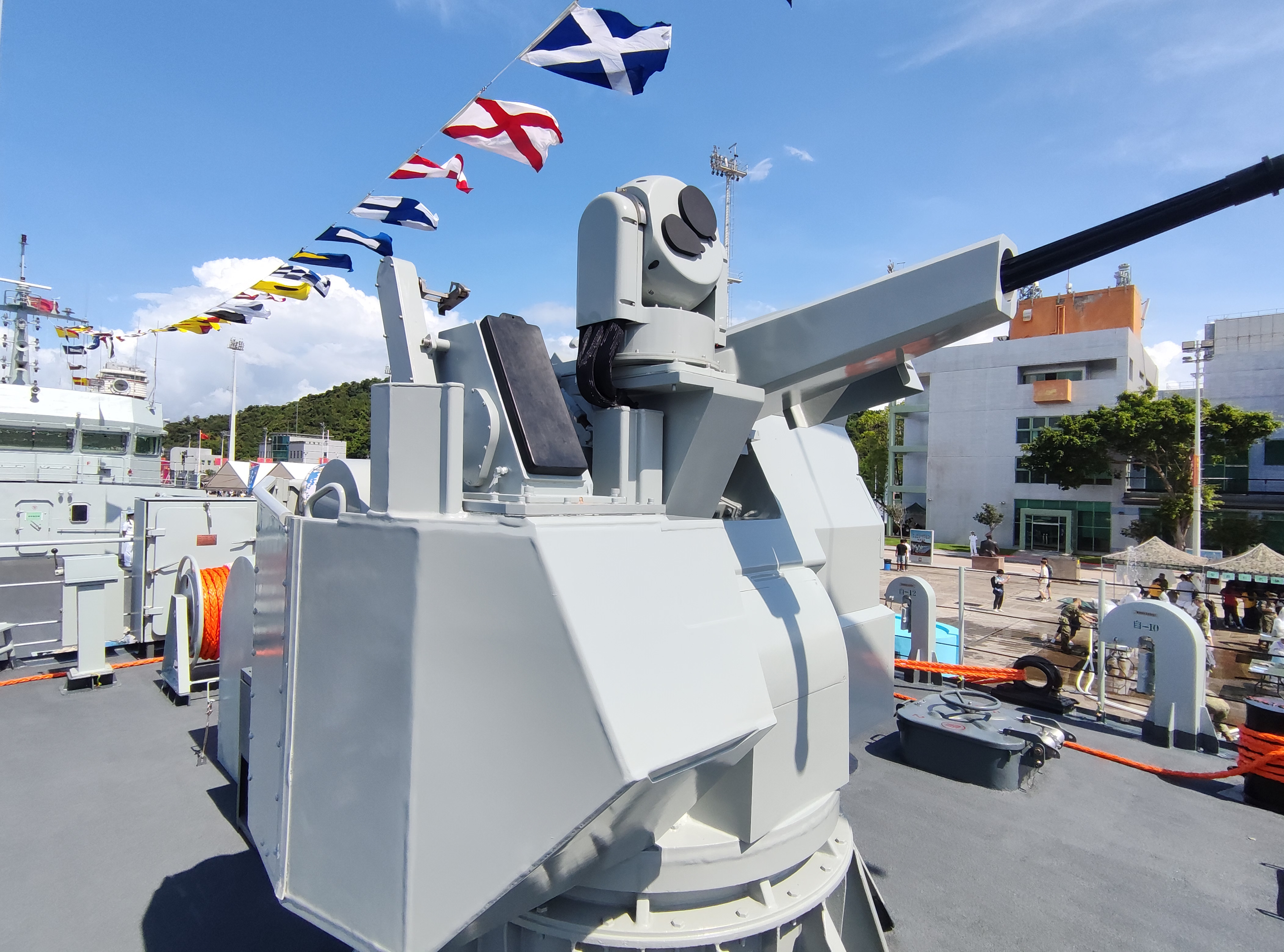
H/PJ-17

The H/PJ-17 or PJ17 is a single-barreled 30 mm (1.2 in) naval gun employed by the People's Liberation Army Navy. The H/PJ-17 is designed as a close-in defensive weapon for amphibious landing ships, corvettes, and patrol boats.

== History ==
Older ships of the People's Liberation Army Navy commonly use the AK-630 close-in weapon system, which has an automatic engagement mode using MR-123 radar and a manual control mode where an operator can aim the gun using an instrument post on the deck, exposed to the elements. The AK-630 system has a bulky autoloader that protrudes through the deck, making it unsuitable for ships of smaller tonnage. China sought to develop a lightweight naval gun that could be mounted on small ships. The H/PJ-17 design began development in 2007, with the weapon certified in 2010.

== Design ==
The H/PJ-17 is a low-cost, lightweight, non-deck penetrating, remotely controlled weapon station with daylight optics and an LLP12A fire-control system, combining an electro-optical (EO) sight and a radar. The H/PJ-17 turret has a weight of 1,500 kg (1.5 t), a single barrel of 30 × 165mm autocannon, a firing rate of 300 rounds per minute, a ready ammunition box of 100 rounds, an effective range of 3,000 m (1.6 nmi) against anti-ship missiles, and a maximum range of 8,000 m (4.3 nmi).

The H/PJ-17 has multiple ways to engage the target. The gun can receive target information from the ship's radar and automatically engage the target; it can also rely on its own tracking system without any connection to the ship. It also has multiple manual engagement modes. It can be controlled by the weapon station inside the ship or a manual seat on the gun turret itself. The seat is located on the right side of the barrel, where the operator can access the control console with a joystick, EO sight, the backup optical sight, or an iron sight to aim and fire the gun.

== Operational history ==
The H/PJ-17 is mounted on the Type 056 corvette and Type 072A landing ship.

== See also ==
- Naval weaponry of the People's Liberation Army Navy
- 20 mm modèle F2 gun
- Bofors 40 Mk4
- Mark 38 25 mm machine gun system
