= Type 753 Radar =

Chinese navigational radar

Type 753 radar is a Chinese navigational radar used by Chinese merchant ships and ships of Chinese navy. Developed by Shanghai 4th Radio Factory in the early 1970s, Type 753 radar is fully transistorized, with a maximum range of 48 nautical miles. In 1979, efforts were made to improve MTBF of this radar, resulting in drastic increase of MTBF, from the original 107 hours in 1978 to 406 hours in 1980. In 1981, the radar achieved a mile stone of continuously operating 1000 hours without failure.

== See also ==
- Chinese radars
- Naval Weaponry of the People's Liberation Army Navy
