= Chen bottom mine =

Chinese naval mine series

The Sinking (沉, or Chen) naval mines are a series of Chinese naval mines. These are bottom mines.

Estimates place Chinese total mine stocks at between 80,000 and 100,000 mines.

== Chen-1 ==
The Sinking-1 (沉-1, or Chen-1) naval mine is the fourth type of naval mine entering Chinese service in 1966. It is a bottom mine jointly developed by the 710th research institute, the 152nd Factory and Fengxi Machinery Factory (汾西机器厂), and it was the first Chinese naval mine using an acoustic fuze. It is useful for shallow water and port defence or blockading.

== Chen-2 ==
The Sinking-2 (Chinese: 沉-2, Transliteration: Chen-2) bottom mine was the first indigenous designed Chinese naval mine that could adopt a range of fuzes, such as acoustic, contact, infrasonic, ultrasonic and magnetic fuzes. The project was jointly developed by Fengxi Machinery Factory (Chinese: 汾西机器厂) and the 710th Research Institute in 1972, and was mainly used for coastal regions. The mine was accepted into service in 1975.

== Chen-3 ==
The Sinking-3 (沉-3, or Chen-3) is the successor of Sinking-2 (Chen-2) bottom mine, and is also a shallow water mine. It was jointly developed by the Vanguard Instrumentation Factory (前卫仪表厂) and Suzhou Maritime Machinery Factory (苏州船用机械厂) in 1974. In comparison to its processor, this mine is the first in the Chinese inventory to adopt combined fuses instead of being only able to have a single type of fuze. Currently, all Sinking-3 bottom mines are upgraded to the Sinking-3-II (Chen-3Yi) standard and this latest version is a fully solid state model. The upgrades were done by the Vanguard Instrumentation Factory.

== Chen-4 ==
The Chen-4 or Sinking-4 (沉-4, or Chen-4) is a bottom mine with non-contact fuses. It was jointly developed by the 710th Research Institute of Chinese Shipbuilding and the Dongfeng Instrument Factory (东风仪表厂). This bottom mine is the counterpart of the Drifting-2 drifting mine and like the latter, it can be disassembled for easy transportation and then reassembled prior to being deployed. A mine with negative buoyancy which remains on the seabed. Also called a ground mine.

== Chen-5 ==
The Sinking-5 (Chen-5) is a Chinese naval mine. It is a small bottom mine, like the Chen-4 and Drifting-2 drifting mine it was designed around the concept of People's War of guerrilla warfare. It can be dismantled for easy transportation and reassembled just prior to being planted. Unlike the Sinking-4 (Chen-4) bottom mine, this bottom mine cannot be used as part of other Chinese naval mine systems, but it does have the ability to incorporate the contact fuse, a feat that the Sinking (Chen-4) bottom mine lacks. Furthermore, Sinking-5 (Chen-5) bottom mine is developed by Fengxi Machinery Factory (汾西机器厂) can also be used on land as part of booby traps. The evaluation of this mine was carried out under combat conditions - these mines were deployed in Cambodia and Vietnam during the Vietnam War and the customers were satisfied with the performance, and as a result, the mine was considered an achievement and won a national award in 1978.

== Chen-6 ==
Another shallow-water bottom mine.

== See also ==
- Naval weaponry of the People's Liberation Army Navy §Mine warfare
