= Te-2 remotely controlled mine =

Chinese naval explosive

Te-2 remotely controlled mine (Specialized-2 or 特-2) is the second generation remotely controlled naval mine that is manufactured in China.

The project was jointly developed from 1978 by the Vanguard Instrumentation Factory (前卫仪表厂) in Shanghai, the Electric Automation Research Institute and the Navy Test Base with assistance from Shanghai Jiaotong University and the Naval Engineering Academy. The upgraded Te2-1 mine can operate in water 6–65 metres (20–213 ft) deep.

The mine has three states: safety, armed, and detonation. The bottom mine can remain in any one of these three states, though most of time it remains in the safety state. Upon receiving the remote commands, the mine can be switched to any one of the three states. A minefield that consists of Specialized-2 bottom mines can thus be inactivated when friendly force passes, and activated when an enemy is in the area. Currently, all Specialized-2 mines are upgraded to the Specialized-2-1 standard.
