= Mao-4 moored mine =

Moored-4 (锚-4, Mao-4, M-4) is a naval mine developed by Fengxi Machinery Factory (汾西机器厂) and was accepted into active service in 1974. It was the first moored mine in the Chinese service to incorporates an acoustic fuze. The mine can be planted by both the surface ships and submarines from depth of 20–200 meters and weighs 600 kg. The Mao-4 has an effective radius of 20 meters and effective life of 2 years. The original mine was upgraded to Moored-4-I (锚-4甲, Mao-4-Jia) standard in November 1982 and subsequently upgraded into Moored-4-II (锚-4乙, Mao-4-Yi) standard by December 1985. In comparison to earlier versions, the latest version adopted large scale integrated circuits.
