= Type 515 Radar =

Chinese 2-D air search radar

Type 515 radar is a Chinese 2-D air search radar in service with both Chinese Ground Force (PLAGF) and Chinese navy (PLAN). The radar has been retired from active service, being replaced by more advanced radars such as Type 517 on PLAN destroyers.

Originally developed as a land-based 2-D air search radar, Type 515 radar only provides range and bearing, and a separate altitude finding radar is needed to provide altitude information of targets, thus completing the complete air defense radar system. However, due to space limitation, the altitude radar is not installed onboard Type 051 destroyers. Type 515-Jia (甲) is the first radar that utilizes semiconductors, with design work begun in May 1967. Preliminary design was submitted in December 1967 and approved in January of the following year. First sample was completed in 1969 and passed tests on land in August 1970, and sea trials begun in the following month. However, it was discovered in sea trials that the hydraulic stabilization system was prone to malfunctions and the size of the antenna was too large that it blocked the coverage of 57 mm gun. On April 21, 1971, it was decided to delete the hydraulic stabilization system and change the size of antenna, resulting in Type 515-Yi (乙). After three years of side-by-side service of both models, Chinese navy decided in October 1975 to adopt Type 515-Jia, but with huge design changes, mainly aimed to improve reliability and stability. The redesigned radar was completed in June 1976, and sea trials were completed in April 1981. In May 1982, the design was finalized and certification was received three month later in August of the same year. Type 515 radars were installed on Type 051 destroyers but have since been replaced by Type 517 radars. Specification:

- Band: A
- Beam: 25° - 30°
- Pulse width: 30 nanosecond
- PRF: 400 – 445 pps

== See also ==
- Chinese radars
- Naval Weaponry of the People's Liberation Army Navy
