= Te-1 rocket propelled mine =

Chinese naval mine

The specialized-1 (特-1, or Te-1) rocket propelled mine, also known as the EM-52, was developed by the 710th Research Institute in 1981, and completed by 1987 after more than 100 major design changes. Specialized-1 mines are planted by surface ships in up to 200 m (660 ft) of water. The maximum speed of the mine is greater than 50 m/s (112 mph). In the early 1990s, the Specialized-1 was upgraded with a larger warhead, and the maximum depth of plant was more than doubled.

At least two more mines were developed from the Te-1 in the late 1990s; their designations are unknown. Both were self-steering, a feature the Specialized-1 lacks. The first of the two new mines is similar, with speed of in excess of 80 m/s. A single mine of this type can control an area with a radius of 3 km (1.9 mi).

The second design is a simplified version, intended to reduce cost by eliminating the rocket motor, depending on its natural buoyancy to propel the mine upward. There is yet a third mine derived from the second one with further simplification to reduce cost by further eliminating the control fins, thus lacking the directional capability, and this mine had to be released much earlier from its anchorage like the one with directional capability but without the rocket motor. The area control of both type, of course, is much less than the one with rocket motor, but still larger than the Specialized-1, which could only travel in straight line.
