= Vosper Thornycroft MK9 =

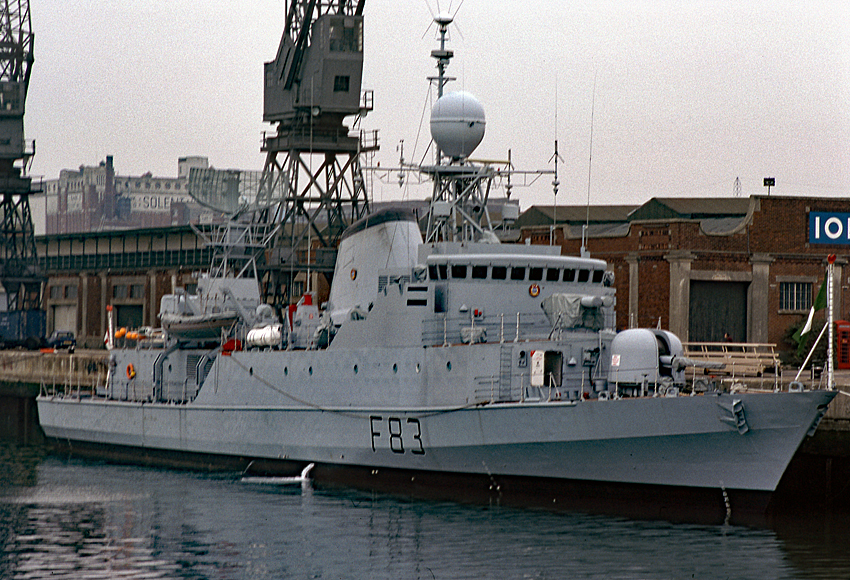
- F83 Erinomi at Woolston

Class overview
- Name: Vosper Thornycroft MK9
- Builders: Vosper Thornycroft
- Operators: Nigerian Navy
- Preceded by: Vosper Thornycroft MK 3
- Succeeded by: Qahir class
- Built: 1977-1978
- In commission: 1979-present
- Planned: 2
- Completed: 2
- Canceled: 0
- Active: 0
- Laid up: 2
- Lost: 0
- Retired: 0
- Preserved: 0

General characteristics
- Class & type: Vosper Thornycroft MK9
- Type: Corvette
- Displacement: 850 tonnes full displacement
- Length: 226 ft (69 m)
- Beam: 31 ft 6 in (9.60 m)
- Propulsion: 4 MTU 20V956TB92 diesels; 20,512 bhp; 2 shafts with controllable pitch propellers
- Speed: 27 knots (50 km/h; 31 mph)
- Range: 2,200 nautical miles (4,100 km; 2,500 mi) @ 14 knots (26 km/h; 16 mph)
- Complement: 87 plus 3 flag staff
- Sensors & processing systems: Radar: 1 × Plessey AWS-2 air search radar; 1 × Decca TM1226 navigational radar; 1 × Hollandse WM24 fire control radar; Sonar: 1 × Plessey PMS-26 sonar
- Electronic warfare & decoys: Cutlass ESM; Protean countermeasures launchers
- Armament: 1 × Sea Cat Surface-to-air missile; 1 × Oto Melara Compact 76mm/62 dual purpose gun 750 rounds carried; 1 × Bofors 40 mm cannon; 2 × Oerlikon 20 mm cannon; 1 × Bofors 375 mm (14.8 in) ASW rocket launcher (no longer operational)

The MK9 Corvette was ordered by the Nigerian Navy in April 1975 as follow-ons to the smaller Vosper Thornycroft MK3, which was confusedly grouped under the same Hippo class designation, both ships being named after the word for hippopotamus in local languages. The two ships were built by Vosper Thornycroft.

Laid down in October 1975, NNS Erinomi was launched on 20 January 1977 and commissioned on 29 January 1980. She was given the pennant number F83. She stopped making patrols in 1993 due to constant breakdowns. In 1994-1995 she underwent a refit at Lagos which at least made her seaworthy again, but with some systems off-line. The Erinomi participated in a December 1995 naval exercise; she rarely left port thereafter until 1997, when minor repairs allowed her to again undertake patrols, but by 2007 the ship was again non-operational.

Her sister ship, the NNS Enyimiri, was commenced in February 1977, launched on 9 February 1978 and commissioned on 2 May 1980. She was given the pennant number F84. She had ceased patrols in 1992 and by 1996 was in extremely bad shape. In 2000 a major repair effort allowed her to leave port again, although with most sensors and some weapons nonfunctional. In December 2004, the Enyimiri suffered a massive explosion resulting in crew fatalities and severe damage to the ship. She was decommissioned on 22 December 2004.
