= AN/TPS-72 =

Military transportable search radar system

AN/TPS-72 is a planar array, E\F band air search radar based on the AN/TPS-43 and produced by Westinghouse.

The AN/TPS-72 is a short range to medium range radar.

In accordance with the Joint Electronics Type Designation System (JETDS), the "AN/TPS-72" designation represents the 72nd design of an Army-Navy electronic device for ground transportable search radar system. The JETDS system also now is used to name all Department of Defense electronic systems.

== See also ==
- List of radars
- List of military electronics of the United States
