= AN/APQ-116 radar family =

Radar model series by Texas Instruments

AN/APQ-116 is one of the most numerous terrain-following radars (TFRs) produced in the world, and with over 500 units built, it was a member of a family of TFRs consisted of nearly two dozen models, all of which are based on the same general design principle. First developed by Texas Instruments, and later produced by Raytheon when the latter purchased the radar business of the former.

== AN/APN-149 ==
This is the first terrain-following radar for use on crewed aircraft, designed by Bert Bechtel, a former Navy engineer, who had designed a radar scan template control technique that permitted safe aircraft descent in adverse weather. The concept was the basis of winning a $750,000 US Army contract to develop a radar system to automatically guide a drone aircraft. The US Army did not pursue the project to production, but the US Air Force became interested and believed that Bechtel's innovation would protect the low-flying planes.

== AN/APN-165 ==
Terrain-following/ground-mapping radar by Texas Instruments for OV-1 Mohawk

== AN/APQ-89 ==
TFR (Terrain-Following Radar) tested on T-2 Buckeye for pilots to familiarize TFR operation on other combat aircraft.

== AN/APQ-99 ==
Developed by TI as a multi-modes radar, in addition to terrain avoidance and terrain-following modes, and AN/APQ-99 can also be used for ground mapping. Smaller in size then the Westinghouse AN/APQ-72 and fitted in the nose of for A-7A, RF-4B/C. AN/APQ-99 is also supplied to Germany, Iran and Japan.

== AN/APQ-101 ==
Terrain-following radar by Texas Instruments.

== AN/APQ-110 ==
K_{u} band terrain-following radar by Texas Instruments for General Dynamics F-111A and RF-4C. It replaced the side-looking mapping radar by Goodyear Tire and Rubber Company on RF-4C.

== AN/APQ-115 ==
Improved AN/APQ-110 terrain-following radar by Texas Instruments for the A-7A, General Dynamics F-111, RF-4C, and C-130E. AN/APQ-115 has a single contoured, spoiled parabola antenna, with a search cone of 5 degrees wide, spanning from +7 degrees above to -18 degrees below to the boresight of the aircraft. AN/APQ-115 suffered from inaccurate references (poor stabilization and Doppler inputs), which directly lead to the development of more advanced system such as AN/APQ-122.

The Texas Instruments I-band AN/APQ-116 is a TFR used in A-7 Corsair II and C-130 Hercules aircraft. AN/APQ-116 was basically the integration of previously independent AN/APQ-115 TFR into the ILAAS digital navigation system. The radar also fed a digital weapons computer which made possible accurate delivery of bombs from a greater stand-off distance, greatly improving survivability compared with faster platforms such as the F-4 Phantom II.

== AN/APQ-122 ==
X band multi-mode radar by Texas Instruments for C-130 Hercules, Boeing RC-135, Boeing T-43 and Boeing E-4. AN/APQ-122 has a slotted planar array antenna with a separate X-band receiver used to generate MRI video, with a search cone of 7.5 degrees wide, spanning from +8 degrees above to -17 degrees below to the boresight of the aircraft. For AN/APQ-122(V)B, the stabilization reference could either be manually or automatically switched to MD-1 gyro if the LN-15J inertial navigational system become unreliable or inoperable, thus terrain following operation can still continue, where in earlier system such as AN/APQ-115, if the Doppler fails, the terrain following operation would be discontinued.

== AN/APQ-126 ==
60 kW improved AN/APQ-116 J band terrain-following radar by Texas Instruments for A-7D/E AC-130 and CH-53 Sea Stallion. This is primarily AN/APQ-116/122 incorporating improved maritime capability. Specifications:

- Maritime surface search: (high altitude): 150NM
- Maritime surface search: (low altitude): 106NM
- Maritime surface search (vs. small contacts): 51NM
- Land surface search (med altitude): 34NM
- Air search: 20NM
- Terrain following: 19NM

== AN/APQ-134 ==
K_{u} band terrain-following radar by Texas Instruments to replace AN/APQ-110 for F-111A/FB-111A.

== AN/APQ-139 ==
K_{u} band multi-mode radar by Texas Instruments for B-57G specially designed for night interdiction missions in Vietnam.

== AN/APQ-146 ==
Improved AN/APQ-134 K_{u} band terrain-following radar by Texas Instruments for F-111C/F.

== AN/APQ-147 ==
TFR (Terrain-Following Radar) for initial batch of MH-60K

== AN/APQ-154 ==
Improved AN/APQ-141 terrain-following radar by Texas Instruments for HH-53.

== AN/APQ-158 ==
Improvement of AN/APQ-126 with 15 line replaceable units for the MH-53 Pave Low helicopter and PAVE LOW III requirement. Designed to perform terrain following mode/function in high clutter area such as in cities.

== AN/APQ-162 ==
Development of AN/APQ-99 for RF-4C, incorporating experience gained from AN/APQ-116 and other radars in the family.

== AN/APQ-168 ==
Multi-mode radar by Texas Instruments for HH-60D & MH-60K. Increased jamming resistance, improved weather penetration, better guidance in turn flight, and better power management function in semi-covert mission. The radar can operate in terrain-clearance, terrain-avoidance, air-to-air ranging and cross-scan modes, the latter combining ground-mapping or terrain-avoidance with terrain-following. A terrain storage facility permits the radar to have a reduced duty cycle, thereby reducing the probability of detection by enemy ESM equipment. There's also the incorporation of built-in test (BITE) provides a high degree of fault isolation and detection.

== AN/APQ-171 ==
Improved AN/APG-146 terrain-following radar by Texas Instruments for F-111C/F, developed by Texas Instruments in the mid- eighties with the objective of replacing the four different TFR models used across the USAF F-111 fleet with a single type. While the old TFR had an MTBF around 20 hours, MBTF for the AN/APQ-171 is better than 50 hrs.

== AN/APQ-172 ==
Improved AN/APQ-162 TFR (Terrain-Following Radar) for RF-4C.

== AN/APQ-174 ==
The AN/APQ-174 is an American K_{u} band radar used on MH-60K Blackhawk and MH-47E Chinook helicopters for navigation, particularly at low level.

Developed during the late 1980s as a derivative of the AN/APQ-168 and LANTIRN radars, it was initially procured in the early 1990s. The radar can be used for a variety of missions, including combat search and rescue (CSAR) and special forces insertion and extraction.

This pod-mounted radar has a variety of modes, including terrain-following and terrain-avoidance, ground mapping, air-to-ground ranging, weather detection/tracking, navigation, beacon interrogation, cross scan modes and power management. Angular scan times are 5.5º/sec and the weather mode is improved during heavy rain by the use of circular polarization.

== AN/APQ-186 ==
Improved AN/APQ-174 by Raytheon for CV-22

== AN/APN-237 ==
K_{u} band terrain-following radar by Texas Instruments part of AN/AAQ-13

== See also ==
- List of radars
- List of military electronics of the United States
