= Type 349 radar =

Type 349
- Country of origin: China
- Manufacturer: CETC 20th Research Institute
- Introduced: Early 2000s
- Type: Fire-control
- Frequency: X band/J band (NATO)
- Range: 18 kilometres (11 mi)
- Other names: H/LJP-349

The Type 349 is a Chinese naval fire-control radar. It is part of the HHQ-7 surface-to-air missile system and integrated into close-in weapon system mounts.

== Variants ==
Type 349
Type 349A
Adds another set of optoelectronic tracking equipment.
LR66
Export variant.

== See also ==
- List of radars § China

== Sources ==
- Hundman, Eric (March 2025). China's Air Defense Radar Industrial Base. China Aerospace Studies Institute (Report).
