= AN/APY-10 =

American multifunction radar

The AN/APY-10 is an American multifunction radar developed for the U.S. Navy's Boeing P-8 Poseidon maritime patrol and surveillance aircraft. AN/APY-10 is the latest descendant of a radar family originally developed by Texas Instruments, and now Raytheon after it acquired the radar business of TI, for Lockheed P-3 Orion, the predecessor of P-8.

The AN/APY-10 mechanically scanned radar is a development of Raytheon's AN/APS-149 radar. Compared to the AN/APS-137, it is smaller in size, lighter, and uses less power. The radar is optimized for maritime, littoral and overland surveillance.

The AN/APY-10 is able to provide high resolution radar images in both overland and water modes. Available modes include color weather, synthetic aperture radar (SAR), inverse synthetic aperture radar (ISAR), periscope detection, and navigation. ISAR mode is said to be capable of both detecting, imaging and classifying surface targets at long range using a variety of resolutions.

== AN/APS-80 ==
The AN/APS-80 is the first member of the radar family the AN/APY-10 directly descends from, and this first member of the family was installed on P-3A/B. AN/APS-80 is an analog radar with a peak power of 143 kW. The original AN/APS-80 produced a single 2.6 x 3.4° beam, but later version, AN/APS-80A produces two beams: a 3.6° pencil beam and an 18° fan beam. A unique feature pioneered by AN/APS-80 is that it adopts two antennas to provide 360° coverage, with one antenna in the nose, the other in the tail, under the magnetic anomaly detector (MAD).

The size of the antenna is 42 inches (110 cm) for AN/APS-80, 42 x 24 inches for AN/APS-80A, and the gain is 34 dB for AN/APS-80 and 35 dB for AN/APS-80A. Each antenna can cover a 210° sector, and the scan rate for AN/APS-80 is either 6 or 12 revolution per minute (rpm), covering the scan sector of 36 or 72 degrees per second. For AN/APS-80A, the scan rate is 6 rpm at 45 degrees per second or 48 scans per minute.

== AN/APS-88 ==
AN/APS-88 is a lightweight derivative of earlier AN/APS-80 with more compact size for smaller aircraft such as the Grumman SHU-16B Albatross and Grumman S-2 Tracker. The peak power is 45 kW and like AN/APS-80, AN/APS-88 is also an X-band radar.

== AN/APS-115 ==
AN/APS-115 is a development of AN/APS-80A, and it is the first attempt of digitization by providing digital input into the digital combat system installed on the P-3. Other improvement over the original AN/APS-80 included the integration of two separate AN/APS-80A radar into a single unit via a single planar position indicator (PPI) display. The most important improvement is that AN/APS-115 is an automatic version of earlier AN/APS-80/80A, but some users felt that in the hands of an experienced operator, the manual analog AN/APS-80/80A has a better chance to detect small targets such as submarine periscope in sea clutter. AN/APS-115 utilizes cavity magnetron.

== AN/APS-116 ==
X-band AN/APS-116 is the upgrade AN/APS-88 using technologies and experience gained in the success of AN/APS-115. The biggest difference between AN/APS-115 and AN/APS-116 is that while the former has two antennas like AN/APS-80, the latter only has a single antenna in the nose of the platform like AN/APS-88 it replaced. AN/APS-115 is able to achieve a resolution of 1.5 ft and the typical range against a submarine periscope is 15.5 nautical miles (nm).

== AN/APS-124 ==
Knowledge gained in the development of AN/APS-115/116 is used in the development of X-band AN/APS-124, the first model in the radar family developed for ASW helicopters. Due to the adoption of the traveling wave tube (TWT), the peak power is significantly increased to 350 kW. Due to the size and weight constraint, the parabolic antenna of radars for fixed aircraft is replaced by a 183 by 30.5 centimetres (72.0 in × 12.0 in) slotted planar array antenna for AN/APS-124, and scan rate is 6 or 12 rpm, with 120 rpm for weather. The array of AN/APS-124 produces a 1.2 x 20 degrees beam, and the typical range against a 1 square metre (11 sq ft) target is 16 nautical miles (30 km; 18 mi) in comparison to 20 nautical miles (37 km; 23 mi) of AN/APS-115/116. AN/APS-124 is installed on Sikorsky SH-60 Seahawk.

== AN/APS-127 ==
AN/APS-127 is a derivative of AN/APS-124 adopted for light fixed wings aircraft. AN/APS-115/116 was too heavy and bulky for light aircraft, and AN/APS-124 for helicopters was an ideal candidate for adoption for light fixed winged aircraft, and the result is the X-band AN/APS-127, which equipped Danish Gulfstream III and USCG HU-25.

== AN/APS-134 ==
Knowledge gained from the success of AN/APS-124 and AN/APS-127 was used to upgrade AN/APS-115 and AN/APS-116, and the result is the X-band AN/APS-134, which has a track while scan (TWS) mode, and up to 32 surface targets can be simultaneously tracked. Developed as an "international successor" to AN/APS-115/116, AN/APS-134 utilizes TWT and it is integrated with on board electronic warfare support measures (ESM).

== AN/APS-137 ==
A further development of AN/APS-115/116/124/127/134 is the X-band AN/APS-137, incorporating synthetic aperture radar (SAR), inverse synthetic aperture radar (ISAR) and Ground moving target indication (GMTI) modes. The resolution in SAR & ISAR modes is 0.9 metres (3.0 ft). A helicopter version of AN/APS-137 was also developed, but it lost out to Telephonics AN/APS-143.

== AN/APS-148 ==
AN/APS-148 Sea Vue (SeaVue) radar is a X-band radar based on the knowledge of AN/APS-137, developed by Raytheon for light fixed winged aircraft. SeaVue is a modular design that is upgradable, with only three line-replaceable units.

== AN/APS-149 ==
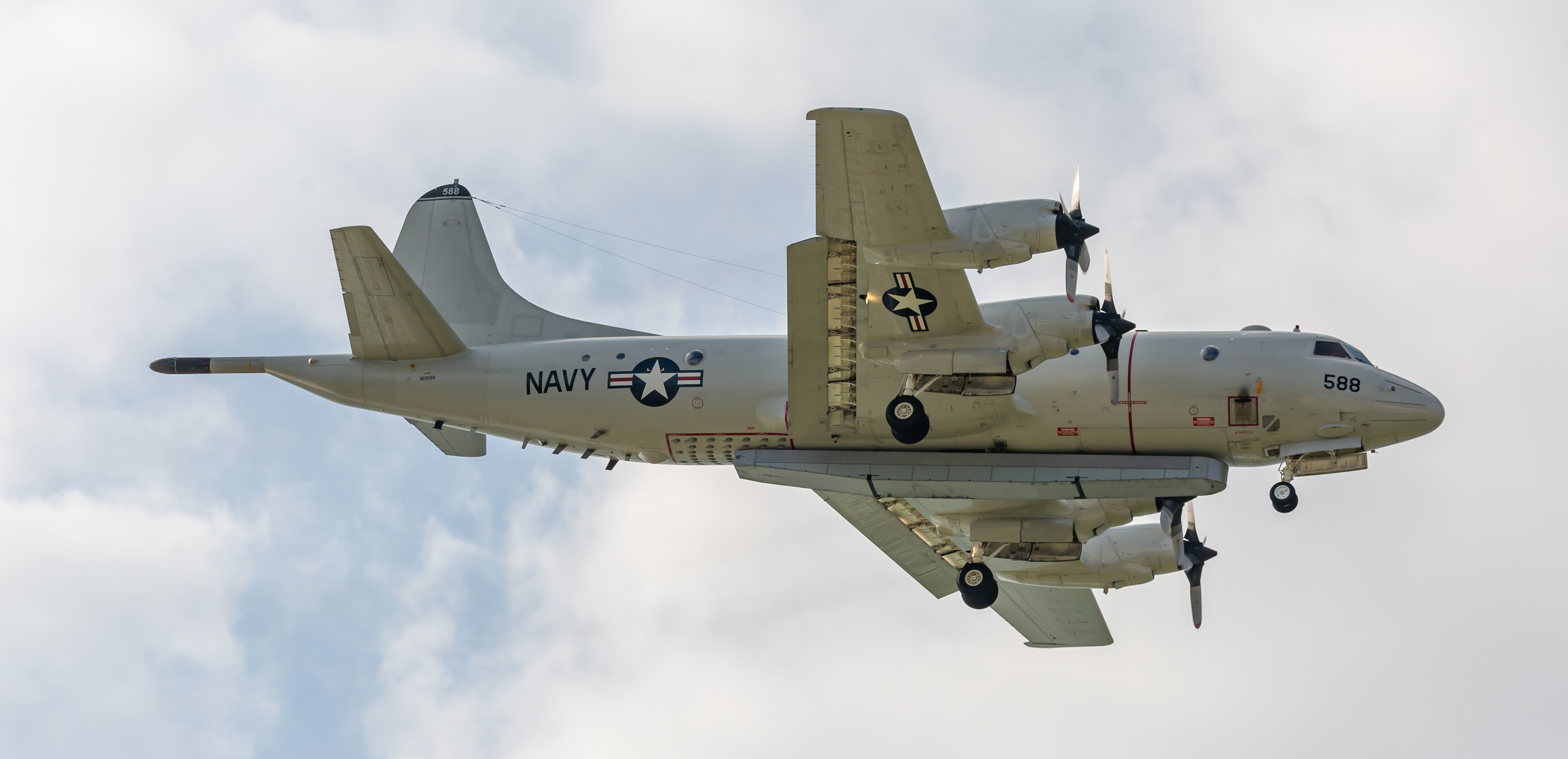
A P-3C Orion with the LSRS

AN/APS-149 Littoral Surveillance Radar System (LSRS) is the first model in the radar family that adopts active electronically scanned array (AESA) radar, and it is developed for littoral and overland surveillance radar, initially fielded aboard the service's P-3C Block Modification Update Program (BMUP) maritime patrol and surveillance aircraft. The wide-aperture radar is mounted in a ventral pod attached to the belly of the host aircraft by at least three attachment points.

== AN/APS-506 ==
AN/APS-506 is the Canadian derivative of AN/APS-116 with the addition of Spotlight SAR mode. Two more additional real-time imaging modes are also incorporated, including ISAR and strip map modes.

== See also ==
- List of radars
- List of military electronics of the United States
