= Samen (radar) =

- Country of origin: Iran
- No. built: Not mentioned
- Type: multi-stage 3D radar
- Frequency: VHF
- Other names: Can also be named "Thamen"

The Samen multi-stage 3D radar, developed by Iran, is an element in the country’s defense capabilities in the field of radar, reconnaissance and identification systems.

== Description ==
Despite its compact size, this radar plays an important role in increasing the security of Iran’s airspace.

The Samen 3D radar, which operates in the VHF band and is known for its long wavelengths, is particularly effective in detecting stealthy targets, especially those with minimal cross-sections. The radar is classified as a medium-range and tactical radar. Among the achievements of the Samen radar is its ability to detect the American Global Hawk drone, which on June 20, 2019, facilitated its destruction by Iran’s defenses by transmitting data to the Som Khordad system.

== See also ==
- Islamic Republic of Iran Armed Forces
- Defense industry of Iran
- List of equipment of the Iranian Army
- Iran Electronics Industries
