= HAL-3 =

The HAL-3 is an airborne navigation radar developed by the Shanghai Institute of Electron Physics originally for the Y-10 programme. Development started in June 1980 and was completed in February 1985 and it has been extensively tested on the Boeing 707 and Y-7. The overall technical characteristics are thought to be similar to the Bendix AN/APS-133/RDR-1F.

== Specifications ==
- Range:
  - air-to-ground mode : 240 km
  - air-to-air mode: 15 km
- Output power: 50 kW
- Power consumption: 800W
- Weight: 9999 kg
