= EL/M-2226 =

Israeli radar

EL/M-2226 is an over-the-horizon radar system developed by Israel Aerospace Industries. It is used for both civilian and military coastal monitoring.
