= RES-1 Radar =

Chinese-built mobile radar system

RES-1 radar is a mobile radar designed to provide precise position data of medium & low altitude aircraft, which is mainly used in the air defense, coastal defense or battlefield air defense.

It is manufactured and exported by the Nanjing Changjiang Machinery Group Co Ltd.
