= FIELDctrl 3D MIMO =

- Country of origin: Poland
- Manufacturer: Advanced Protection Systems
- Designer: Advanced Protection Systems
- Introduced: 2020
- Type: 3D radar; MIMO; FMCW
- Frequency: X band, 9.7–10 GHz in most fixed variants
- Beamwidth: 45–90° horizontal; 20–90° vertical in fixed panel variants
- Range: 3–14 km, depending on variant, target class and RCS
- Azimuth: 45–90° in fixed panel variants
- Elevation: 20–90° in fixed panel variants
- Power: 80–200 W, depending on variant
- Related: SKYctrl; SAN

FIELDctrl 3D MIMO is a family of Polish three-dimensional air-surveillance radars developed and manufactured by the Gdynia-based company Advanced Protection Systems (APS). The systems are primarily intended for detecting, classifying and tracking unmanned aerial vehicles (UAVs), including small objects moving at low speeds and low altitudes. As of July 2026, the family included the Advance, Range, Runway, Ultra SR, Ultra LR and Follow variants.

The radars use multiple-input multiple-output (MIMO) and frequency-modulated continuous-wave (FMCW) techniques and, in most variants, operate in the X band at frequencies of 9.7–10 GHz. They determine target range, azimuth and elevation, and the resulting data can be transmitted to command-and-control systems, cameras, electro-optical targeting systems, jammers or weapons. FIELDctrl is a sensor and does not itself neutralise detected objects.

The family is one of the principal sensor types used in the SKYctrl counter-UAS system and in the SAN system being developed for the Polish Armed Forces.

== History ==
The origins of the system are associated with work begun in 2014 by Maciej Klemm and Radosław Piesiewicz, who had previously been involved in microwave research at the Gdańsk University of Technology. One of the factors that prompted the work was reporting about unexplained drone flights over French nuclear power plants. Advanced Protection Systems began operations in 2015.

In July 2017, Klemm and Piesiewicz filed a patent application for a multisensor system for detecting, classifying and neutralising unmanned aircraft. Patent application PL422312A1 described an FMCW radar operating in the 9–11 GHz range, a microphone array and the possible use of optical, thermal-imaging and radio-frequency sensors. It also included automatic signal classification and integration with a jamming device. The application was published in January 2019.

At the International Defence Industry Exhibition (MSPO) in 2018, APS presented a mobile system under the name Ctrl+Sky. The vehicle-mounted system combined radar with a radio-frequency sensor, an optical system, an operator station and a jammer.

The FIELDctrl 3D MIMO family was publicly introduced in November 2020. The initial product range consisted of the Access, Advance, Range and Follow variants, which differed in spatial coverage, range and data-update rate. The early Advance model was reported to update data four times per second, while the contemporary Follow model was reported to update it twenty times per second. These parameters are not repeated in the current product specifications.

Deliveries of systems incorporating FIELDctrl radars to Ukraine began in 2022. In the same year, the Polish Armed Forces ordered SKYctrl systems using radars from the family.

In 2023, Enterprise Investors acquired a significant minority stake in APS. The investment was intended, among other purposes, to increase the scale of the company's operations and support the development of new products. Subsequent product literature introduced the Ultra radar, followed by its Ultra SR and Ultra LR variants.

In July 2025, the public premiere of a new version of the Follow radar was announced for MSPO 2025. The device was presented as a mechanically steerable radar intended both for detection and for precise target designation to effectors.

In January 2026, agreements were signed for the development and delivery of 18 battery modules of the SAN system. APS was selected as the supplier of FIELDctrl Ultra and Follow radars and the SanView command-and-control system.

== Design and operation ==
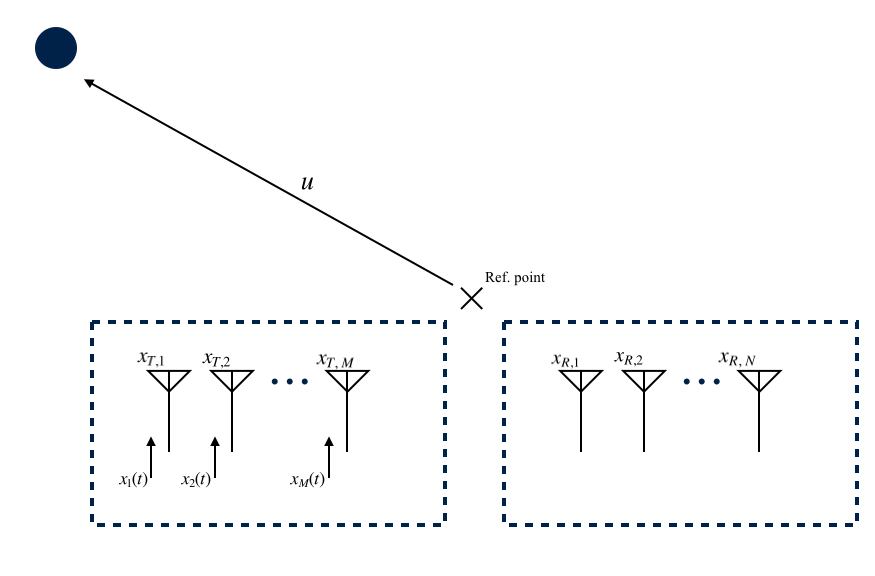
Diagram of a MIMO radar in which transmitting and receiving antennas form a virtual antenna array

In MIMO radar, the use of multiple transmitting and receiving channels makes it possible to create a virtual antenna array through signal processing. This increases the number of available observation channels and improves directional measurement accuracy without requiring a physical antenna containing a corresponding number of elements.

Schematic representation of FMCW Doppler radar operation

The fixed FIELDctrl variants observe a defined sector of airspace. In the current models, the sector ranges from 45° to 90° in azimuth and from 20° to 90° in elevation. All-round coverage can be obtained by arranging several panels appropriately, while the Follow model uses a moving mechanism that allows it to track a detected object.

The Advance, Range, Runway, Ultra SR and Ultra LR variants operate between 9.7 and 10 GHz and use a modulation bandwidth of up to 300 MHz. Advance, Range and Runway have an output power of 80 W, while Ultra SR and Ultra LR have an output power of 160 W. The current Follow product page specifies a power output of 200 W but does not state its operating frequency or bandwidth.

The manufacturer states that the radars can simultaneously track multiple targets, distinguish rotary-wing from fixed-wing drones, detect hovering objects and detect targets moving transversely to the radar beam. Automatic classification is described as using machine learning algorithms and features intended to distinguish UAVs from birds. The detailed classification features and the number of simultaneously maintained tracks have not been publicly disclosed.

The minimum declared target speed for the fixed models is 0 m/s, allowing hovering UAVs to be detected. The minimum tracking altitude is stated as approximately 1 m. The housings are specified as complying with IP66 and IP67 requirements.

APS has also developed the PDQ tool for predicting detection performance and planning radar deployment while accounting for terrain and obstacles.

== Variants ==
The specifications in the table correspond to the product range available in July 2026. Detection ranges are stated for targets with specified radar cross sections (RCS). Values for different RCS values and target types are therefore not directly comparable.

| Variant | Coverage azimuth/elevation | Power | Declared detection and classification range | Dimensions and mass | Power supply |
|---|---|---|---|---|---|
| Advance | 90°/60° | 80 W | RCS 0.01 m²: up to 3 km RCS 0.1 m²: up to 5.5 km | 645 × 360 × 180 mm 31.4 kg | 24 V DC or 230 V AC |
| Range | 90°/30° | 80 W | RCS 0.01 m²: up to 5 km RCS 0.1 m²: up to 9 km | 645 × 360 × 180 mm 31.4 kg | 24 V DC or 230 V AC |
| Runway | 45°/20° | 80 W | RCS 0.01 m²: up to 8 km RCS 0.1 m²: up to 14 km | 850 × 567 × 190 mm 40.6 kg | 24 V DC or 230 V AC |
| Ultra SR | 90°/90° | 160 W | RCS 0.01 m²: up to 5 km RCS 0.1 m²: up to 7.5 km | 840 × 680 × 320 mm 83 kg | 230 V AC |
| Ultra LR | 90°/30° | 160 W | RCS 0.01 m²: up to 8 km RCS 0.1 m²: up to 12 km | 840 × 680 × 320 mm 83 kg | 230 V AC |
| Follow | 90°/90° | 200 W | Shahed-type target: up to 14 km | Not specified | Not specified |

Advance is intended for monitoring a wide sector at short and medium ranges. It has been assigned NATO Stock Number 5840-43-003-1820. Range has narrower elevation coverage and a greater range, while Runway has the narrowest sector and the greatest declared range among the fixed 80 W models. Runway was designed for monitoring elongated areas such as runways and airport approaches.

Ultra SR provides broad elevation coverage, while Ultra LR is a longer-range variant with a 90°/30° field of view. Follow is intended to track an already detected target and provide precise target data to effectors.

The range stated by the manufacturer depends on the target's RCS, its position and orientation relative to the radar, flight altitude, terrain, reflections from the ground and buildings, electromagnetic interference and the configuration of detection algorithms. Published specifications therefore do not support a general statement that every radar in the family can detect every drone at a range of 14 km; that figure applies only to specified variants and target classes.

=== Specification changes ===
The names and specifications of individual variants have changed as the family has developed. Product literature from 2024 described a single Ultra variant with a power output of 200 W, a mass of 81 kg, coverage of 90°/90° and a range of 6 km against a target with an RCS of 0.01 m². The current product range divides the Ultra into the Ultra SR and Ultra LR, both rated at 160 W and 83 kg. The specifications of the earlier Ultra therefore should not be combined with those of the later SR and LR variants.

The Follow name appeared in the first publicly presented product range in 2020, even though the device presented at MSPO 2025 was described as a world premiere. Available materials do not explain whether the 2025 system was an entirely new design or a later generation of the earlier variant.

A 2025 Follow product sheet specified 90°/30° coverage, 80 W power, a range of 5 km for a target with an RCS of 0.01 m² and 12 km for a Shahed/Geran-type target with an RCS of 1 m². Material announcing the premiere stated a range of up to 16 km, while the manufacturer's current webpage gives 90°/90° coverage, 200 W power and a range of up to 14 km against a Shahed-type target. No public explanation of the differences between these configurations has been provided.

== Applications and integration ==
FIELDctrl radars can be used independently as surveillance sensors or as components of a multisensor counter-unmanned air system (C-UAS). In SKYctrl, radar data are combined with daylight and thermal imagery and information from radio-frequency sensors. The target position can be passed to an electro-optical system, jammer, gun, guided missile or unmanned interceptor.

Applications listed for the systems include:

- detection of reconnaissance and attack UAVs;
- protection of military positions, bases, borders and ports;
- protection of power plants, refineries, fuel storage facilities and other critical infrastructure;
- surveillance of airports, runways and approach zones;
- countering the use of drones for smuggling into prisons;
- protection of public events and protected persons;
- target designation for non-kinetic and kinetic effectors.

Follow was developed, among other purposes, for cooperation with FPV drones, anti-aircraft artillery and dedicated counter-UAS effectors. According to manufacturer materials, it can operate from either a fixed position or a vehicle.

Within the SAN system, each fire platoon is planned to use one FIELDctrl Ultra radar and two FIELDctrl Follow radars. An analysis by MILMAG, based on the organisation of 18 batteries, calculated a total of 54 Ultra radars and 108 Follow radars. The official Polish government announcement, however, referred to 52 fire platoons, while the programme's organisational description envisaged three platoons in each of 18 batteries, or 54 platoons. The precise number of FIELDctrl radars ordered was not stated in the government announcement.

The approximately PLN 15 billion net value refers to the entire SAN programme, including command-and-control systems, several types of radar, vehicles, electronic-warfare systems, electro-optical systems, guns, machine guns, missiles and unmanned interceptors, rather than solely to APS equipment.

== Operators and deployments ==
The complete list of customers, number of systems manufactured and detailed configurations of most deployments have not been publicly disclosed. Some publications use the FIELDctrl name for the radars themselves, while others describe complete SKYctrl systems equipped with FIELDctrl radars.

=== Poland ===
The Polish Armed Forces purchased SKYctrl systems in 2022. Publications by Rzeczpospolita and Dziennik Gazeta Prawna reported a total of 14 systems. A Polish Press Agency report from September 2025, however, quoted a statement referring to four systems purchased in 2023. Publicly available sources do not explain the discrepancy.

The radars have also been presented, tested or used in connection with the protection of Polish airports, ports, energy-sector facilities and public events. In 2026 they became one of the components of the ordered SAN system.

=== Ukraine ===
Deliveries to the Armed Forces of Ukraine began in September 2022. The systems were intended to protect military forces, borders and critical infrastructure. The number of systems in the initial delivery was not disclosed.

In 2024, reports described dozens of devices operating in Ukraine. In June 2026, the president of APS said in an interview that the company had delivered more than 100 radar systems to Ukraine. The figure was provided by the manufacturer and was not accompanied by a publicly available delivery list.

=== Other countries and civilian applications ===
In 2025, APS solutions were selected in a procurement procedure for fixed systems intended to protect strategic energy facilities in Lithuania. The order included radar, radio-frequency and electro-optical sensors as well as countermeasures, but the number and variants of FIELDctrl radars were not disclosed.

In 2024, deployments were reported at a prison in Tallinn and in connection with an airport in Stavanger. At the same time, APS was reported to be conducting approximately 75 deployment projects in 24 countries. The number of projects does not correspond to the number of radars, as a single installation may use several devices.

In 2022, Military Africa reported the delivery of a FIELDctrl radar to the special forces of Ivory Coast, without specifying the number or version of the devices.

Trade publications have also mentioned APS projects or customers in Saudi Arabia, the United Arab Emirates, Qatar, Norway, Estonia, Finland, the Czech Republic, South Korea, Singapore and India. For most of these cases, the specific FIELDctrl variant, number of radars and final end user have not been disclosed.

== Production ==
The total number of FIELDctrl radars produced has not been publicly disclosed. In 2024, APS stated that it was producing hundreds of radar modules and sensors and dozens of complete radar systems annually. At the time, 18 people worked on radar assembly and the company employed a total of 172 people.

In 2026, APS began expanding its production facilities. A planned manufacturing hall was intended to increase sensor-production capacity approximately fivefold, with a target maximum capacity of up to 1,000 radar systems per year. This represented planned maximum production capacity rather than the number of systems actually produced in 2026. The company employed approximately 200 people and planned to recruit a further 100 employees.

APS marketing materials describe FIELDctrl as developed and assembled in Poland and as not subject to United States International Traffic in Arms Regulations (ITAR). A detailed list of suppliers and the proportion of Polish and foreign components has not been published.

== Testing and assessments ==
In a study conducted by researchers from South Korea's Agency for Defense Development and KAIST, a FIELDctrl Range radar was used to track a DJI Phantom 4 multirotor during an experiment involving controlled redirection of the UAV by means of GNSS spoofing. The trials were conducted at distances of up to approximately 500 m. The mean differences between radar measurements and the reference position were −0.6 m in range, 0.57° in azimuth and 2.13° in elevation. One source of the elevation error was multipath reflection from the ground when the radar was positioned approximately 1.5 m above the surface. The study involved a single UAV type and was not a military acceptance test of the radar.

At DSEI in 2023, APS stated that SKYctrl systems used in Ukraine achieved an approximately 90% target-tracking success rate. The figure was a manufacturer claim reported by the media; no methodology or independent audit of the result was published.

In 2025, Rzeczpospolita reported problems said to have been identified by the Polish military in some SKYctrl systems, concerning target detection and the number of false alarms. The Polish Armament Agency stated at the time that additional analyses and tests were under way. APS responded that the systems had met the requirements applicable at the time of purchase and had passed acceptance testing, while the nature of UAV threats had changed since 2022 and required modernisation. The company also stated that radar classification of small drones and birds does not provide 100% effectiveness.

Full reports from the Polish trials and data identifying the radar variants, software configurations and terrain conditions involved in the reported problems have not been publicly released.

== See also ==
- 3D radar
- MIMO radar
- Frequency-modulated continuous-wave radar
- Counter-unmanned air system
- Unmanned aerial vehicle
