= AWS 2 Radar =

Radar

AWS 2 is a naval and ground radar used for surface warning and air and surface target indication. It was developed in 1957 by the United Kingdom and was primarily designed for installation of destroyer, frigate and corvette but also can be used for installation in the ground.

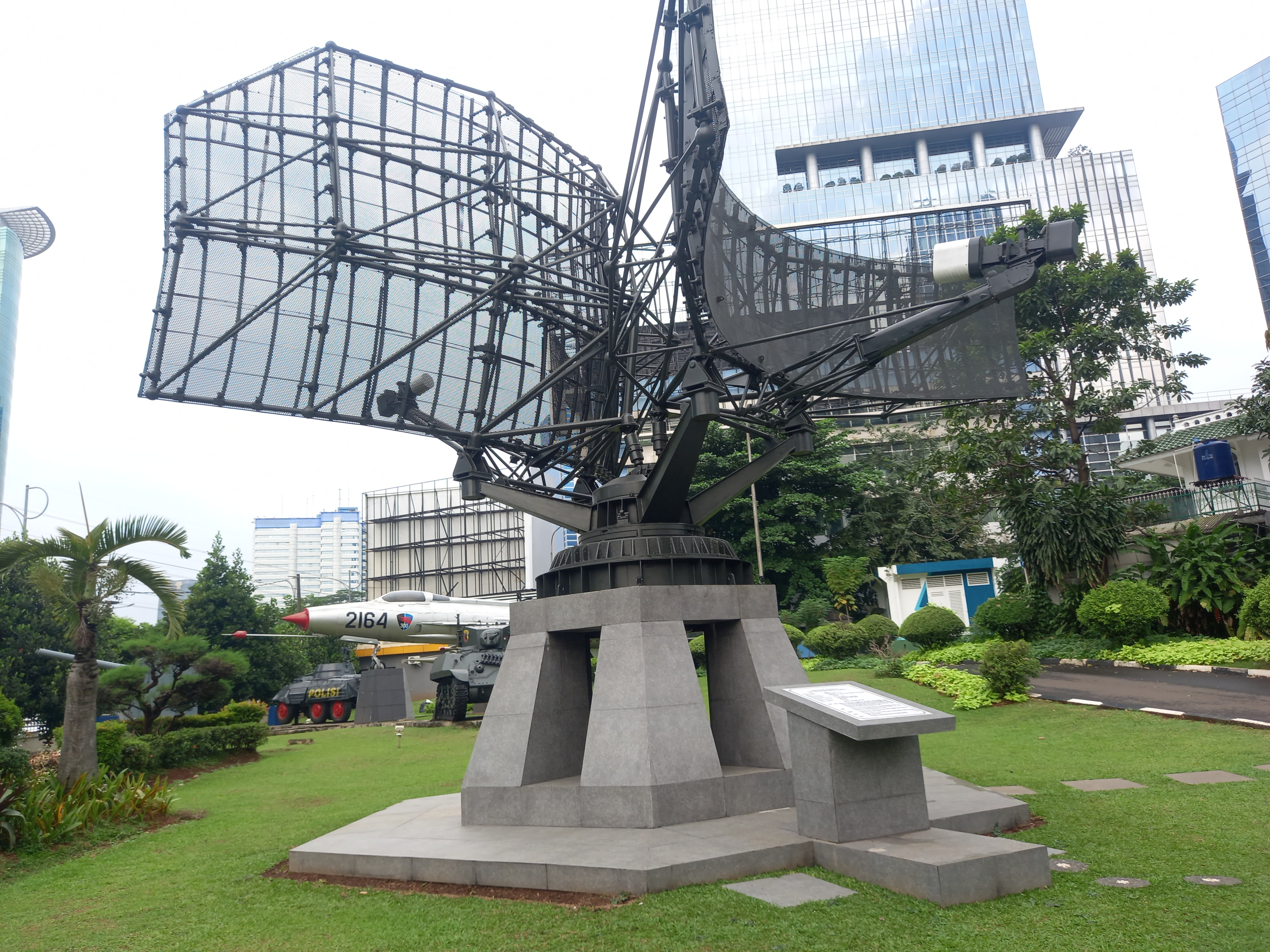
AWS 2 Ground Radar
