= Russian air surveillance radars =

This is an overview of Russian early-warning radars for air surveillance, and related design bureaus.

== NNIIRT ==
The Nizhny Novgorod Research Institute of Radio Engineering (Russian acronym: NNIIRT) has since 1948 developed a number of radars. These were mainly radars in the VHF-band, and many of which featured developments in technology that represented "first offs" in the Soviet Union. Innovations include the first Soviet air surveillance radar with a circular scan: the P-8 Volga (NATO: KNIFE REST A) in 1950, the first 3D radar: the 5N69 Salute (NATO: BIG BACK) in 1975, and in 1982 the first VHF-band 3D-radar: the 55Zh6 Nebo (NATO: TALL RACK). Other innovations were radars with frequency hopping; the P-10 Volga A (NATO: KNIFE REST B) in 1953, radars with transmitter signal coherency and special features like moving target indicator (MTI); the P-12 Yenisei (NATO: SPOON REST) in 1955 as well as the P-70 Lena-M with chirp signal modulation in 1968 or the widely used P-18 Terek (NATO: SPOON REST D) in 1970.

== NIIDAR ==
The Dalney Radiosvyazi NII company (Russian acronym: NIIDAR) developed a number of radars from 1949 to 1959 in co-operation with the NII-20 Lianozovo electromechanical plant. However, unlike the NNIIRT, this design bureau focused on higher frequency radars like the P-20, P-30, P-30M, P-35, P-32D2 and the P-50 (NATO: E/F-bands). These radars have better accuracy and faster scan rates, and are thus more suited for ground control of fighter aircraft, which complement the lower frequency radars developed by the NNIIRT design bureau. NNIDAR has in recent years expanded their product range to include innovative radar designs like the Podsolnukh-E over-the-horizon (OTH) surface-wave radar and the 29B6 Konteyner. The latter, while also being an OTH-radar, has separate locations for the transmitter and the receiver making it a bi-static system.

== VNIIRT ==
All-Russian Scientific Research Institute of Radio Engineering (Russian acronym: VNIIRT)

- 1955; P-15 1RL13 Tropa FLAT FACE A, UHF (B/C-band),
- 1970; ST-68 (19Zh6) TIN SHIELD, E-band, Fun fact: First Soviet radar with digital coherent signal processing,
- 1974; P-19 1RL134 Danube FLAT FACE B, UHF (B/C-band)

== Summary ==
Chronology of Soviet and Russian air surveillance radars
Radar	NATO reporting name	Radio spectrum (NATO)	Developed	Fun fact	Design bureau
P-3		VHF	1948	The first Soviet post-World War II air surveillance radar	NNIIRT
P-20 Periscope	TOKEN	E/F-band	1949		NIIDAR
P-50 Observatory		E/F-band	1949	Stationary variant of P-20	NIIDAR
P-30	BIG MESH	E/F-band	1955		NIIDAR
P-30M	BIG BAR	E/F-band	1959		NIIDAR
P-35	BAR LOCK	E/F-band	1958		NIIDAR
P-8 Volga	KNIFE REST A	VHF	1950	The first Soviet radar with circular scan	NNIIRT
P-10 Volga A	KNIFE REST B	VHF	1953	Frequency hopping	NNIIRT
P-12 Yenisei	SPOON REST	VHF	1955	Coherent radar with MTI	NNIIRT
P-15 Tropa	FLAT FACE A	UHF	1955		VNIIRT
P-14 Lena	TALL KING	VHF	1959		NNIIRT
P-35M	BAR LOCK	E/F-band	1961	Improved antenna layout	NIIDAR
P-70 Lena-M		VHF	1968	First Soviet radar with chirp	NNIIRT
P-18 Terek	SPOON REST D	VHF	1970		NNIIRT
ST-68	TIN SHIELD	E-band	1970	First Soviet radar with digital coherent signal processing	VNIIRT
Sword-35	BAR LOCK	E/F-band	1971	faster scanning, improved antenna, polarization filters, pulse duration/frequency modulation	NIIDAR
5N84A Oborona-14	TALL KING C	VHF	1974		NNIIRT
P-19 Danube	FLAT FACE B	UHF	1974		VNIIRT
5N69 Salute	BIG BACK	D-band	1975	First Soviet 3D-radar	NNIIRT
44ZH6	TALL KING B	VHF	1979	Stationary version of Oborona-14	NNIIRT
55ZH6 Nebo	TALL RACK	VHF	1982	First Soviet meter-wavelength 3D-radar	NNIIRT
1L13			1982		NNIIRT
52E6		VHF	1982-1996		NNIIRT
1L13-3 Nebo-SV	BOX SPRING	VHF	1985		NNIIRT
55Zh6U Nebo-U	TALL RACK	VHF	1992		NNIIRT
1L119 Nebo-SVU		VHF	1997-2006		NNIIRT
59N6-1 Protivnik-G1		D-band	1997	Average time between failures 840 hours	NNIIRT
1L122		D-band	1997-2006		NNIIRT
1L121-E		UHF	2011	It is able to monitor even on the Move	NNIIRT
52E6MU		VHF	1997-2006		NNIIRT
P-18 modernisation kits	SPOON REST D	VHF	1997-2006		NNIIRT
55ZH6M Nebo-M		VHF/multi-band	2011		NNIIRT
Nebo-T		VHF	2022	Nebo-T radars are a heavy upgrade of Nebo-U radar stations	NNIIRT
59N6M					NNIIRT
Podsolnukh-E		VHF	2000	over-the-horizon surface-wave radar	NIIDAR
29B6 Container radar		VHF	2000	Bi-static radar	NIIDAR

== See also ==
- Russian surface-to-air missile design bureaus
