= Russian Radio-Technical Troops =

Arm of the Russian Aerospace Forces, armed with radio-technical equipment

Radio-Technical Troops
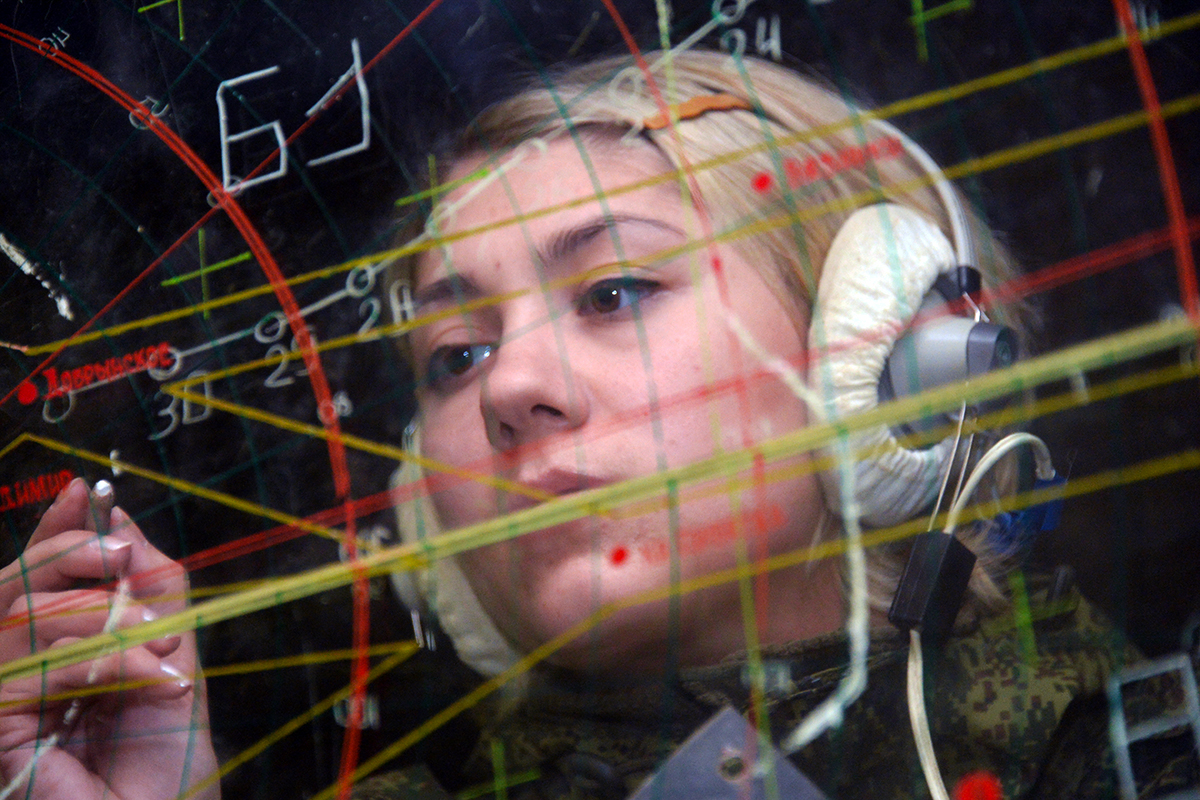
- Active: 15 December 1951 – present
- Country: Russia
- Branch: Russian Aerospace Forces
- Role: Radar detection, reconnaissance, electronic warfare
- Part of: Russian Armed Forces

Commanders
- Current commander: Major General Andrei Chedayev

Insignia
- Collar insignia

The Radio-Technical Troops (RTT; Russian: Радиотехнические войска, romanized: Radiotekhnicheskie voyska, РТВ) is a branch of the Russian Aerospace Forces responsible for radar detection in aerial warfare. The RTT is equipped with radio-technical equipment to conduct radar reconnaissance and give information on the air situation to the Aerospace Forces and other branches of the Russian Armed Forces.

The RTT was established in 1951 as a branch of the Soviet Air Defence Forces to detect enemy military aircraft. It became part of the Russian Air Force in 1997 when the Russian Air Defence Forces (a continuation of the Soviet force) was merged into it. As a branch of the Russian Air Force, it became a sub-branch of the Russian Aerospace Forces in 2015 when it was created through a merger with the Russian Aerospace Defence Forces.

The RTT consists of "radio-technical regiments" (RTR), which are organised as part of an Air Force Association (air army), as well as an air defence division, other units and organisations directly under the Commander-in-Chief of the Air Force. The RTT are the primary source of radar data on the air situation for the Russian Armed Forces. They carry out radar reconnaissance and provide with radar information combat crews of higher command posts (CPs) and CPs of formations, military units and aviation subdivisions, anti-aircraft missile troops and electronic warfare troops. In peacetime, the RTT carry out a air defence role, performing tasks for protection of Russia's airspace.

The main directions of development of the Radio-Technical Troops are as follows: improving the technical equipment of military units and subdivisions by carrying out activities on life extension and modernisation of existing weapons and equipment, development of weapons of the new park:

- radar systems of medium and high altitudes Nebo-M
- radars of medium and high altitudes Protivnik-G1M, Sopka-2
- radar systems of low altitudes Podlyot-K1 and Podlyot-M
- radars of low altitudes Kasta-2-2

== See also ==
- Russian air surveillance radars
