= Knife rest (disambiguation) =

A knife rest is a piece of kitchenware.

Knife rest may also refer to:

- P-8 radar, NATO reporting name "Knife Rest A"
- P-10 radar, NATO reporting names "Knife Rest B" and "Knife Rest C"
