= Nebo-SVU =

Russian military radar system

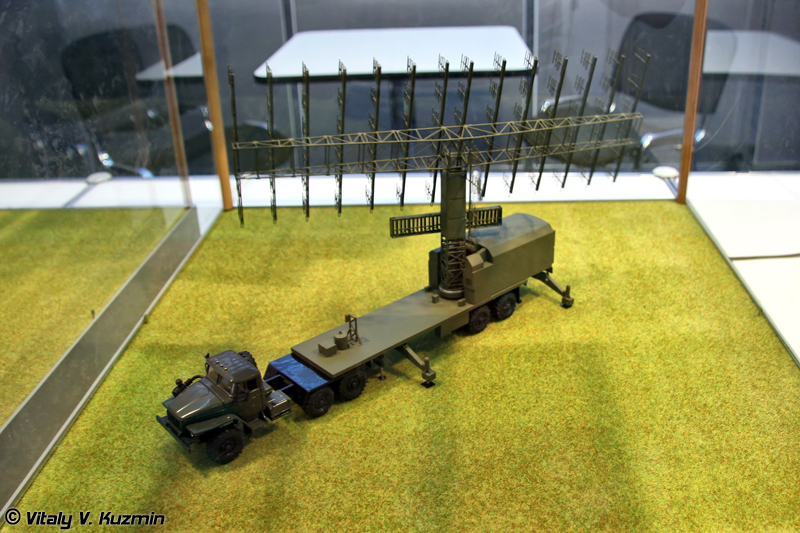
- Nebo-SVU at Maritime Defence Show in 2011
- Country of origin: Russia
- Introduced: 2001
- Frequency: VHF
- Range: 380 km (240 mi)
- Altitude: 100 km (62 mi) in search mode, 180 km (110 mi) in tracking mode
- Azimuth: 360°
- Power: 30 kW

The Nebo-SVU (also known as 1L119) (in Cyrillic: Небо-СВУ, 1Л119) is a very high frequency (VHF) multi-functional radar and the first radar with an active electronically scanned array (AESA) antenna operating at meter wavelengths. The radar was introduced in 2001 as a replacement for the Nebo-SV. It can locate aircraft and other flying objects with 0.1 m^{2} (1sqf) radar cross-section at a distance of 100 km (62 mi).

== History ==
VHF radar systems have wavelengths comparable to aircraft feature sizes and should exhibit scattering in the resonance region rather than the optical region, allowing most stealth aircraft to be detected. The Soviet Union was known for developing VHF radars such as the P-12 and P-18 radars with counter-stealth capabilities. A request to detect stealthy aircraft and provide anti-aircraft systems with their coordinates prompted the Nizhny Novgorod Research Institute of Radio Engineering (NNIIRT) to develop the VHF AESA Nebo-SVU radar with digital signal processors, which is capable of performing target acquisition for surface-to-air missile batteries such as the S-300 missile system or the S-400 missile system. Despite the advantages offered by a VHF radar in detecting stealth aircraft, the longer wavelength results in lower resolution when compared to the size of an X-band radar array.

== Design and description ==
Nebo-SVU is a solid-state phased array with electronic beam steering in azimuth and elevation, more accurate than Nebo SV with much better mobility and incorporating a wide range of improvements. It retains the VHF element design of its predecessor, but uses vertical polarization. It has an array of 84 (14×6) vertically polarized VHF Yagis, each with a 3/8 folded dipole and a director element. A MTBF of 500 h is attributed to the modern technology used in production. It is produced by the Almaz-Antey concern.

The Nebo SVU radar consists of:

- an antenna-hardware post (AAP) on the semi-trailer ChMZAP 9907.2
- diesel power plants (DPPs)
  - ED 2×30-T400-1RA1M4 (or ED 2×30-T400-1RA1M6) on the chassis of a Ural vehicle or
  - ED 2×30-T400-1RA1M5 (or ED 2×30-T400-1RA1M7) on the chassis of a KamAZ vehicle

== Deployment ==
Nebo-SVU is used by the 45th Air and Air Defence Forces Army of the Northern Fleet to control Arctic airspace.

== Operational history ==
On the night of 29-30 May 2024, Security Service of Ukraine (SBU) claimed to have destroyed with drones a Nebo-SVU radar based at Armyansk on Crimea.

In August 2025 the SBU released footage of a strike on a 1L119 Nebo-SVU installed in a previously disused radar dome in Crimea.

On 18 December 2025 Ukraine claimed it had struck a Nebo-SVU at Belbek airfield the previous night and released video stills appearing to support this claim.

== Operators ==
- Russia
- Algeria
- Iran

== See also ==
- P-18PL — Polish VHF AESA radar, designed to replace Soviet-era P-18 radar
- Nebo-M
