= P70 =

P70 may refer to:

== Automobiles ==
- AWZ P70 Zwickau, a small East German car
- De Tomaso P70, an Italian sports racing car
- Toyota Starlet (P70), a Japanese car

== Aviation ==
- Douglas P-70, an American fighter aircraft
- Paratech P70, a Swiss paraglider
- Pottier P.70, a French sport aircraft

== Other uses ==
- Brazilian patrol boat Macaé (P70)
- FB P-70, a Polish pistol
- IBM PS/2 P70, a portable computer
- P-70 Ametist, a Soviet submarine-launched missile
- P-70 radar, a Soviet early warning radar
- P70 road (Ukraine), now Highway H33
- P70-S6 Kinase 1
- Papyrus 70, a biblical manuscript
- ThinkPad P70, a laptop
- P70, a state regional road in Latvia
