= Defense Systems =

Russian-Belarusian air defense system manufacturer

- Company type: Joint stock company
- Industry: Defence industry
- Founded: January 23, 1996
- Products: Air defense systems
- Parent: Oboronprom
- Website: www.defensys.ru

JSC Defense systems is a Russian-Belarusian air defense system manufacturer.

== Overview ==
The company was formed on January 23, 1996, as a joint venture under a Russia-Belarus intergovernmental agreement. It consists of 38 subsidiaries in both countries. The company focuses on upgrading S-125 (SA-3) SAM systems to the modern Pechora-2M and Pechora-2A variants, and on the production of S-300PMU air defense systems.

In addition, JSC Defense Systems produces the Phoenix optronic round-scan target detection system, and the P-18 and Kama–N radars. The company also provides a wide range of services for foreign customers on maintenance and repair of ADMS means both in Russia and on the territory of the customer.

The company currently produces about 15-17 Pechora-2M systems each year. Some Russian media sources have reported that the portfolio of 2009-2011 export orders for Pechora-2M and Pechora-2A SAM systems totaled 200 units, including 70 for Egypt.

== Missiles ==
- S-125 Neva/Pechora (SA-3 "Goa")
