= Russian surface-to-air missile design bureaus =

Research and design institutions

There are several surface-to-air missile design bureaus in Russia, including MKB Fakel, NPO Novator, and DNPP.

== MKB Fakel ==
The MKB Fakel design bureau is located in Khimki Moscow Oblast, and was founded in 1953 under the designation OKB-2. The bureau has designed the following tactical and strategic surface-to-air missiles, as well as exoatmospheric anti-ballistic missile interceptors:

- V-750 series missiles (for SA-2 / S-75) systems),
- 5V24 (V-600), 5V27 (V-601) missiles (for SA-3 / S-125 systems),
- 5V21, 5V28, 5V28V missiles (for SA-5 / S-200 systems),
- 5V55K, 5V55R, 5V55R / 5V55KD, 5V55U, 48N6, 48N6E2 missiles (for SA-10 and SA-20 / S-300P-series systems),
- 40N6 (for the SA-21 / S-400 system),
- 9M96 series (for the SA-21 / S-400 and the S-350 systems),
- 9M33, 9M33M1, 9M33M2, 9M33M3, 9A33BM3 missiles (for SA-8 / 9K33 Osa system),
- 9M330, 9M331, 9M332, 9M338 missiles (for the SA-15 / 9K330 Tor-series systems),
- 51T6 (SH-11) Gorgon missile (for the A-135 ABM-system).

== NPO Novator ==
The NPO Novator design bureau is located in Yekaterinburg Sverdlovsk Oblast, and was founded in 1947 under the designation OKB-8. The bureau has designed the following tactical and strategic surface-to-air missiles for Air Defence Troops of Ground Forces, as well as endoatmospheric anti-ballistic missile interceptors:

- 9M8 missiles (for SA-4 / 2K11 Krug systems),
- 9M38 missiles (for SA-11 / Buk systems),
- 9M82, 9M83 missiles (for SA-12 / S-300V systems),
- 53T6 (SH-08) Gazelle missile (for the A-135 ABM-system).

== DNPP ==
Dolgoprudnenskoe Scientific Production Plant is located in Dolgoprudny Moscow Oblast and was founded in 1931.

- 9M38M1 missiles (for SA-11 / Buk-M1/M1-2 systems)
- 9M317 missile for SA-17 / Buk-M2 system and for the naval version Shtil-1

== NIIP Tikhomirov ==
The Tikhomirov Scientific Research Institute of Instrument Design is located in Zhukovsky Moscow Oblast and was founded in 1955 under the designation OKB-11 GKAT. The institute has designed the following tactical surface-to-air missile systems:

- SA-6 / 2K12 Kub,
- SA-11a / 9K37M1 Buk-M1, 9K37M1-2 SA-11b Buk-M1-2,
- SA-17 / 9K317 Buk-M2
- 9K317M Buk-M3

== KB Tochmash ==
The Nudelman Precision Engineering Design Bureau (KB Tochmash) is located in Moscow and was founded in 1934 under the designation OKB-16. The bureau has designed the following tactical surface-to-air missile systems:

- SA-9 / 9K31 Strela-1 Self Propelled Air Defense Missile System,
- SA-13 / 9K35 Strela-10 Tracked Air Defense Missile System,
  - 9K35 Strela-10 in modified versions (M/M1/M2/M3 and M4),
- Sosna Tracked Air Defense Missile System (current export version of the legacy Strela-10),
- Palma Naval Air Defense Gun and Missile Close-in weapon System.

== KBP ==
The Joint Stock Company KBP Instrument Design Bureau is located in the city of Tula, Tula Oblast and was founded in 1927. The company offers the following combined gun and missile air defense systems:

- SA-22 / Pantsir-S1 Self Propelled Missile and Gun System with 57E6 missiles,
- CADS-N-1 / Kashtan-M Naval Air Defense Gun and Missile Close-in weapon System with 9M311K and 9M311E missiles,
- SA-19 / 2K22 Tunguska-M1 Tracked Missile and Gun System with 9M311, 9M311K, 9M311-1, 9M311M and 9M311-M1 missiles.

== KBM ==
The Joint Stock Company KB Mashynostroyeniya (KBM) which is located in Kolomna was founded in 1942. KBM offers the following MANPADS.

- SA-7A / 9K32 Strela-2, SA-7B / 9K32M Strela-2M
- SA-14 / 9K34 Strela-3
- SA-16 / 9K310 Igla-1
- SA-18 / 9K38 Igla
- SA-24 / 9K338 Igla-S
- SA-29 / 9K333 Verba

== Summary ==
Russian Surface-to-Air Missiles and Systems by Design Bureau
Missile	System	Type	Designer
V-750	SA-2 (Dvina)	Strategic SAM	MKB Fakel
5V24 (V-600)	SA-3 (Pechora)	Strategic SAM	MKB Fakel
5V27 (V-601)	SA-3 (Pechora)	Strategic SAM	MKB Fakel
5V21	SA-5 (Vega)	Strategic SAM	MKB Fakel
5V28	SA-5 (Vega)	Strategic SAM	MKB Fakel
5V28V	SA-5 (Vega)	Strategic SAM	MKB Fakel
3M9	SA-6 (Kub)	Tactical SAM	NPO Vympel
5V55K	SA-10	Strategic SAM	MKB Fakel
5V55R	SA-10	Strategic SAM	MKB Fakel
5V55R / 5V55KD	SA-10	Strategic SAM	MKB Fakel
5V55U	SA-10	Strategic SAM	MKB Fakel
48N6	SA-20	Strategic SAM	MKB Fakel
48N6E2	SA-20 (Favorit)	Strategic SAM	MKB Fakel
48N6E3	SA-21 (Triumf)	Strategic SAM	MBK Fakel
40N6	SA-21 (Triumf)	Strategic SAM	MKB Fakel
9M96	SA-21 (Triumf)	Strategic SAM	MKB Fakel
9M96	S-350 (Vityaz)	Strategic SAM	MKB Fakel
9M33	SA-8 (Osa)	Tactical SAM	MKB Fakel
9M33M1	SA-8 (Osa)	Tactical SAM	MKB Fakel
9M33M2	SA-8 (Osa)	Tactical SAM	MKB Fakel
9M33M3	SA-8 (Osa)	Tactical SAM	MKB Fakel
9A33BM3	SA-8 (Osa)	Tactical SAM	MKB Fakel
9M330	SA-15 (Tor)	Tactical SAM	MKB Fakel
9M331	SA-15 (Tor)	Tactical SAM	MKB Fakel
9M332	SA-15 (Tor)	Tactical SAM	MKB Fakel
9M338	SA-15 (Tor)	Tactical SAM	MKB Fakel
51T6 (SH-11)	A-135	ABM	MKB Fakel
9M8	SA-4 (Krug)	Strategic SAM	NPO Novator
9M38	SA-11 (Buk)	Tactical SAM	NPO Novator
9M82	SA-12 (Antey-300)	Strategic SAM	NPO Novator
9M83	SA-12 (Antey-300)	Strategic SAM	NPO Novator
53T6 (SH-08)	A-135	ABM	NPO Novator
9M38M1	SA-11 (Buk)	Tactical SAM	DNPP
9M317	SA-17 (Buk-M2)	Tactical SAM	DNPP
	A-135	ABM	NIIRP
	SA-4 (Krug)	Strategic SAM	NIEMI
	SA-8 (Osa)	Tactical SAM	NIEMI
	SA-15 (Tor)	Tactical SAM	NIEMI
	SA-12 (Antey-300)	Strategic SAM	NIEMI
	SA-1 (Berkut)	Strategic SAM	KB-1
	SA-2 (Dvina)	Strategic SAM	KB-1
	SA-3 (Pechora)	Strategic SAM	KB-1
	SA-5 (Vega)	Strategic SAM	KB-1
	SA-10	Strategic SAM	Almaz
	SA-20	Strategic SAM	Almaz
	SA-21 (Triumf)	Strategic SAM	Almaz-Antey
	S-350 (Vityaz)	Strategic SAM	Almaz-Antey
	SA-6 (Kub)	Tactical SAM	NIIP Tikhomirov
	SA-11 (Buk)	Tactical SAM	NIIP Tikhomirov
	SA-17 (Buk-M2)	Tactical SAM	NIIP Tikhomirov
	SA-X (Buk-M3)	Tactical SAM	NIIP Tikhomirov
	SA-9 (Strela-1)	Tactical SAM	KB Tochmash
	SA-13 (Strela-10)	Tactical SAM	KB Tochmash
	SA-13 upgrades (M-M4)	Tactical SAM	KB Tochmash
	Sosna	Tactical SAM	KB Tochmash
	Palma	Naval SAM (CIWS)	KB Tochmash
	SA-19 (Tunguska-M1)	Tactical SAM	KBP
	SA-22 (Pantsir-S1)	Tactical SAM	KBP
	Kashtan-M	Naval SAM (CIWS)	KBP
	SA-7 (Strela-2)	MANPADS	KBM
	SA-14 (Strela-3)	MANPADS	KBM
	SA-16 (Igla-1)	MANPADS	KBM
	SA-18 (Igla)	MANPADS	KBM
	SA-24 (Igla-S)	MANPADS	KBM
	SA-X (Verba)	MANPADS	KBM
