= P-20 radar =

Soviet air defense radar

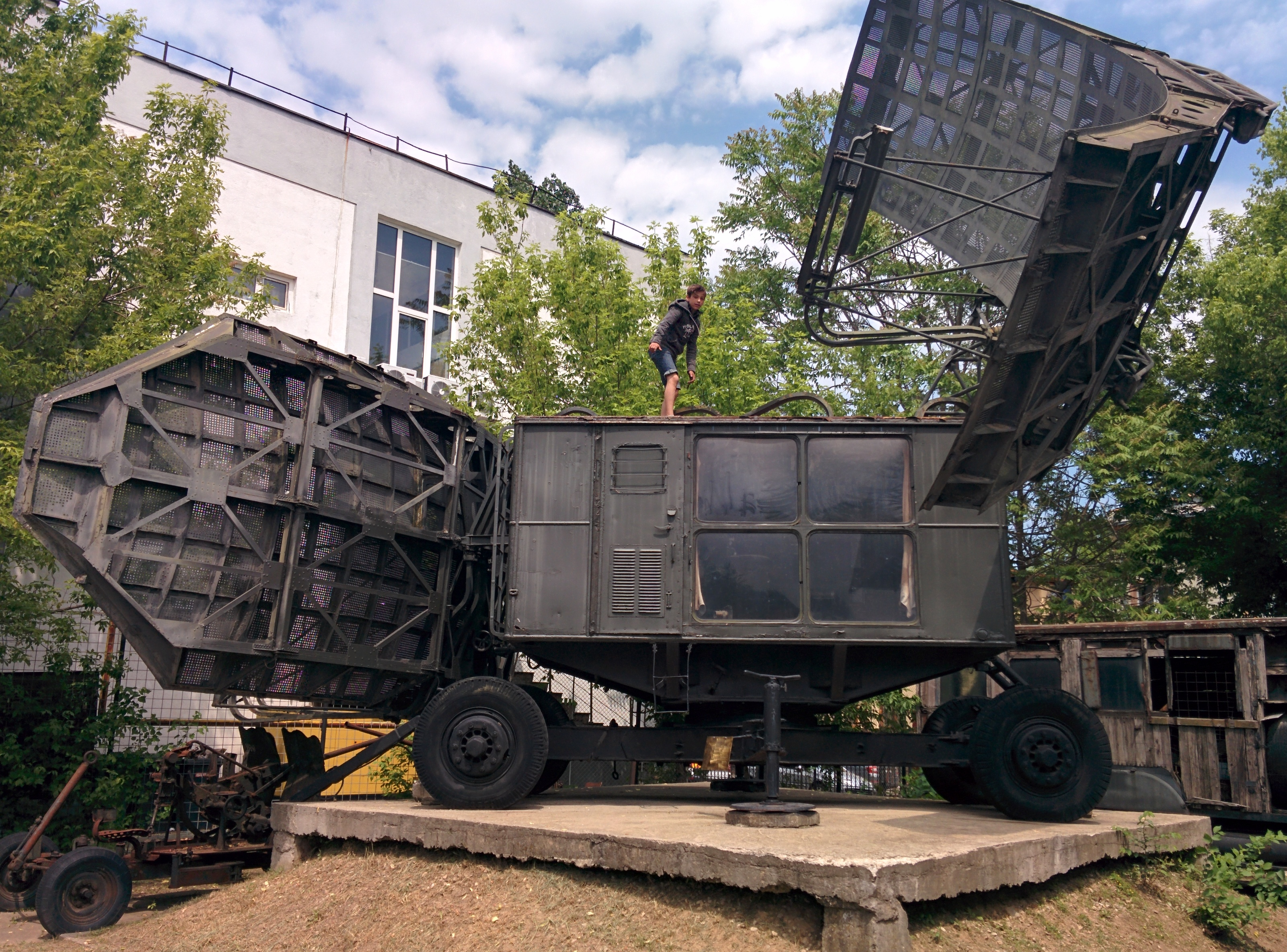
- P-20 in a Romanian museum
- Country of origin: Soviet Union
- Introduced: 1949
- No. built: E band/F band
- Type: Early warning ground control.
- Range: 250 km (155 miles)
- Altitude: 18 km (60,000 feet)
- Azimuth: 360 degrees
- Precision: 0.46 km range, 1.5 degree azimuth
- Power: 1 MW

The P-20 "Periskop" (Russian: "Перископ"; English: Periscope), also referred to by the NATO reporting name "Token" in the west, is a 2D E band/F band radar developed and operated by the former Soviet Union.

== Development ==
The P-20 development was started in 1946 when State Federal Order of the Red Banner Research Institute Number 20 (now called All-Union Scientific Research Institute of Radio Engineering or VNIIRT) was given the task of developing stationary and mobile early warning ground control and interception radar for the Soviet Air Force. The stationary radar later became the P-50 but the mobile radar was to become the P-20. The design inspired a number of successors including the P-30, P-35 and P-37 radar.

The P-20 was the first Russian radar to use the decimetric wavelength, the first prototype being created in 1947, and a factory test unit in 1949. By 1949 the radar had completed state trials and was accepted into wide service within the Soviet airforce, the designers of the P-20 were awarded the State Prize of the USSR in 1950 in recognition of the achievement.

== Description ==
The P-20 is a semi-mobile radar with equipment mounted on eight ZIl-151 trucks, components include the control cabin and power supply equipment as well as a trailer for the antenna and transmitter equipment. The antenna system of the P-20 consists of two open frame truncated parabolic antennae accomplishing both transmission and reception. The radar uses two antenna to determine target altitude by the V-beam system with azimuth scanned mechanically. The upper antenna is tilted to an angle of 45 degrees from horizontal which results in each target appearing twice on the indicator, the distance between the two allows the targets altitude to be approximately estimated by the operator.

The P-20 had four indicators to display the information generated from the radar, panoramic, range and altitude as well as a remote indicator. The radar used five separate channels for reception and transmission, using different frequencies to avoid mutual interference between the beams, three beam channels being used by the upper antenna and two for the lower antenna.

== Operators ==
The P-20 was operated by the Soviet Union from 1949 and though the radars have since become obsolete, they were passed down to successor states after the fall of the Soviet Union. The design has been superseded by later designs like the P-37 radar.

- Soviet Union
- Democratic People's Republic of Korea

== See also ==
- P-30 radar
- List of radars
