= P-14 radar =

Soviet cold-war early warning radar

P-14 "Tall King" radar
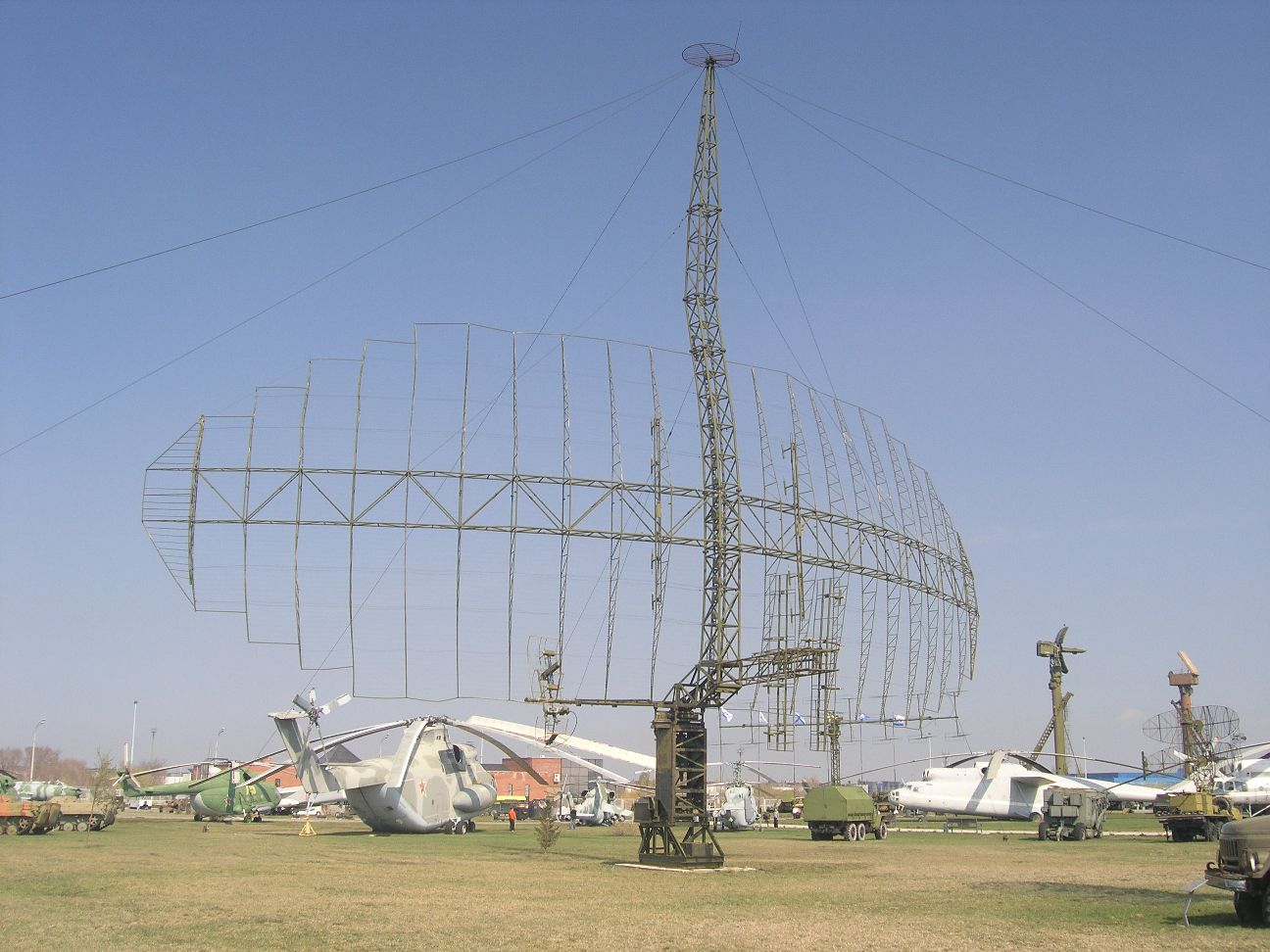
- P-14 radar in the Technical museum Togliatti, Russia
- Country of origin: Soviet Union
- Introduced: 1959; 67 years ago
- No. built: ~2,000
- Type: Early warning radar
- Frequency: VHF
- RPM: 2–6 rpm
- Range: 400 km (220 nmi; 250 mi)
- Altitude: 30 km (98,000 ft); 65 km (213,000 ft) high beam
- Diameter: 33 m (108 ft)
- Azimuth: 360°
- Elevation: 12/17 degrees
- Precision: 1.2 km (0.7 mi) range, 1.2° azimuth
- Power: 900 kW
- Other names: Tall King

The P-14 (also referred to by the NATO reporting name "Tall King") is a 2D VHF radar that was developed and operated by the Soviet Union.

== Development ==
The design of the P-14 2D early warning radar started in 1955 by decree of the CPSU Central Committee. The P-14 being the first high power VHF radar to be developed by the Soviet Union, the radar was accepted into service in 1959 following the successful completion of the radars test program. The P-14 was developed under the direction of V.I. Ovsyannikov by the SKB Design Bureau, a division of State Plant No.197 named after V.I.Lenin, the predecessor of the current Nizhny Novgorod Research Institute of Radio Engineering (NNIIRT). The development team was awarded the Lenin prize by the Soviet Union in 1960 for the development of the P-14 radar.

The P-14 was exported and is occasionally still found in service, several companies have offered upgrade options for the system, including replacement of outdated components with modern systems, such as digital MTI, modern PC based signal processing/display and solid state components. The P-14 was superseded by the Nebo-U "Tall Rack" VHF surveillance radar in 1982.

== Description ==
The P-14 was produced in three variants: the 1RL113 "Lena" (Tall King A) and 44Zh6 "Furgon" (Tall King B) static versions and the 5N84A "Oborona-14" (Tall King C). A total of 731 1RL113 "Lena" were manufactured between 1959 and 1976, 24 of which were for export. The 1RL113 static site was contained in two building (radar and generator) with the control cabin (operated by a crew of five) situated up to one kilometer away, the 44ZH6 operated in a similar fashion but could be relocated more easily. The 5Н84A mobile version featured a folding antenna and transported on six trailers taking over 24 hours to assemble, the radar's control trailer had a crew of six and could be located up to one kilometer from the radar. A secondary radar for IFF is generally used in conjunction with the P-14, either the NRS-12 or the later 1L22 "Parol".

All of the P-14 variants were developed for the long-range detection and tracking of aerial targets and had similar performance characteristics between them. All used a single antenna accomplishing both transmission and reception; the antenna was a large open-frame truncated parabolic antenna, the antenna included a heated de-icing system for extreme conditions. The radars were capable of modulating their frequency around four pre-set frequencies to counteract active interference and used automatic coherent-compensation for passive interference; both systems able to suppress interference by up to 20 dB. In addition to jammer suppression the P-14 can use five auxiliary antennae for direction finding to locate the jammer. The P-14 can operate in four different modes: high beam with increased upper detection limit, low beam with increased range at low to medium altitudes and scan which alternates between high and low beam modes.

== Variants ==
P-14MA/5H84AMA – ground-based long-range VHF surveillance radar P-180U is offered as the modernized follow-on to its prototype, the analogue P-14. Produced in LiTak-Tak (Lithuania).

Modernization of early-warning VHF radar 5N84A (5N84, 44Zh6 or P-14) offers the best (in terms of efficiency/cost ratio) alternative to restoration or repair of legacy prototypes.

Modernization of 5N84A features:

- metric band for "counter-Stealth" capability;
- maximum use of COTS components;
- option of containerized solution (two 20 ft ISO);
- stable, fail-soft, modular solid-state transmitter;
- built-in test equipment;
- no special adjustments required during operation;
- largely simplified maintenance;
- engineered for minimum cost of ownership.

As a result of modernization the radar's detection performance is efficiently improved. Modernized radar features automatic tracking capability as well as data receiving from other radar sensors. Data can be exchanged over a variety of communication channels in approved format.

== Operators ==
The P-14 was operated by the Soviet Union from 1959 and has long since become obsolete being replaced in service by the 55G6 Nebo VHF radar. Many export P-14 have been upgraded and continue to serve in the military and air traffic control role across the world.

- Bulgaria
- China
- Egypt - Upgraded by Aerotechnica MLT
- Hungary The last work present day in Medina (P-14 Oborona)
- Iraq
- Romania
- Serbia - Had two radars, one destroyed in 1999, second phased out in 2012.
- Soviet Union - Passed to successor states.
  - Russia Currently in use
  - Ukraine
- Vietnam - Oborona-14 version is still on active duty.

== Combat history ==
The P-14 has served in several conflicts in the Middle East, Europe, and Asia. The P-14 Radar was recently seen being used during the Russo-Ukrainian War.

== See also ==
- List of radars
