= P-3 radar =

Radar station

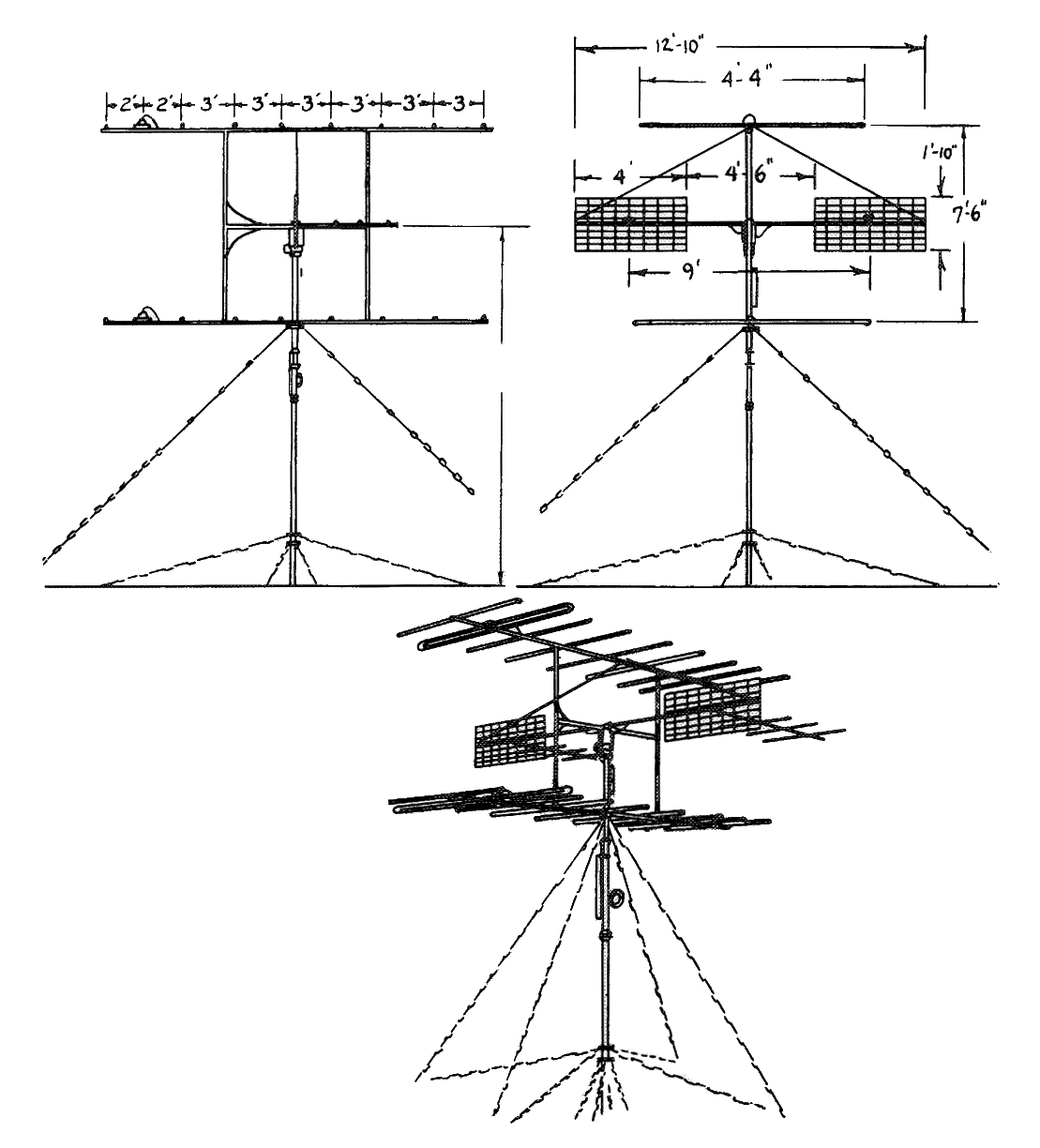
- CIA illustration of a P-3
- Country of origin: Soviet Union
- Introduced: 1947
- Type: Early Warning Ground Control
- Frequency: VHF
- Range: 120-150 km
- Altitude: 10 km
- Azimuth: 360 degrees
- Elevation: 4-18 degrees
- Precision: 1.5 km range, 4-degree azimuth and 1.5-degree elevation
- Power: 80-100 kW

The "Pegmantit 3" or P-3 (also referred to by the NATO reporting name "Dumbo" in the west) was an early VHF radar developed and operated by the former Soviet Union.

== Development ==
The "Pegmantit 3" which is abbreviated to P-3 was one of the first 2D early warning and ground control radars to be developed by the former Soviet Union. The development of the radar was initiated in 1943 as a replacement for the previous RUS stations used during the Second World War and by the end of 1947 the radar was completed and in operational service. The P-3 was the first radar to be developed by the SKB Design Bureau, a division of State Plant No.197 named after V. I. Lenin, the predecessor of the current Nizhniy Novgorod Research Institute of Radio Engineering (NNIIRT). The radar had to be able to detect an aircraft to a range of no less than 130 kilometers, cover 360 degrees in azimuth and 4-18 degrees in elevation. A response time of no more than 25 seconds was stipulated and the radar had to be accurate to within 650 meters in range and within 700 meters in altitude, as well as operate in the VHF band. SKB managed to meet these performance requirements with the P-3 radar and this was confirmed during testing in 1945 before entry into service with the PVO.

== Description ==
The P-3 was produced in two variants the P-3A (fixed) and the P-3M (mobile) with a transmitter and receiver mounted on separate trucks. Both variants operate in a similar fashion using two mast mounted antennas (transmitter and receiver) composed of Yagi antennas mounted one above the other in the case of the receiver, the radar also used an A-scope display. Azimuth was scanned mechanically by the receiver antenna with elevation determined using a Goniometer, the phase difference between the upper and lower Yagi antenna was used to calculate the elevation angle which could then be used to determine the height of the target once the range was known. The P-3 had a maximum power output of up to 100 kW and a pulse duration of 10-15 microseconds.

== Operators ==
The P-3 was operated by the Soviet Union from 1947 but has long since become obsolete and retired from service, replaced by more advanced models entering into service after the P-3 such as the P-8 radar.

== See also ==
- P-8 radar
- List of radars
- Russian air surveillance radars
