= P-12 radar =

Soviet long-range radar

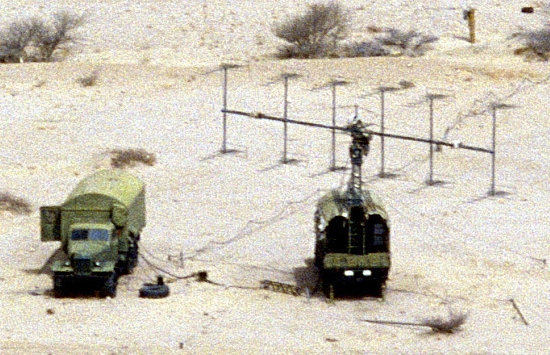
- P-12 "Spoon Rest A" operating in Somalia
- Country of origin: Soviet Union
- Introduced: 1956
- Type: Early Warning Ground Control
- Frequency: VHF
- Range: 200 km
- Altitude: 25 km
- Azimuth: 360 degrees
- Precision: 1 km range
- Power: 180 kW

The P-12 "Yenisei" (also referred to by the NATO reporting name "Spoon Rest A" in the west) was an early VHF radar developed and operated by the former Soviet Union.

== Development ==
The P-12 Yenisei was a development of the earlier P-10 radar, the P-12 being developed between 1954 and 1956. The P-12 was developed by the SKB Design Bureau, a division of State Plant No.197 named after V. I. Lenin who developed the previous P-10, the predecessor of the current Nizhny Novgorod Research Institute of Radio Engineering (NNIIRT). The Yenisei radar was accepted into service in 1956 following the successful completion of the radars test program.

In 1958 a modernised variant of the P-12 passed the testing process and entered into service as the P-12M, the modernised radar featured the ability to shift the radar frequency within a range of 10 MHz. A further modernisation came in 1962 in the form of the P-12MP which featured improved reliability, reduced side lobe radiation and the ability to be paired with a centimeter band search radar, in 1970 the radar was provided with flicker equipment to improve immunity to anti-radiation missiles. The final variant of the P-12 was the P-12NP which was also produced as the P-12NA with a different transport chassis. The P-12NP compared with the previous P-12MP featured improved detection ranges and reliability as well as the ability to locate the control cabin up to 500 meters from the antenna to improve crew survivability as a result of attack on the radar.

== Description ==
The main differences between the earlier P-10 and the P-12 included a new antenna feed system with lower side lobes, reduced to 4% of the main lobe. The P-12 also offered a greater frequency range and greater frequency agility, being able to retune to four pre-set frequencies automatically as well as automatic frequency fine tuning. Finally Yenisei had greater accuracy with improved detection range (250 km) and better protection against passive and active interference. In addition to frequency agility the P-12 was the first Russian radar system to use the coherent cancellation moving target indicator (MTI) method to eliminate ground clutter.

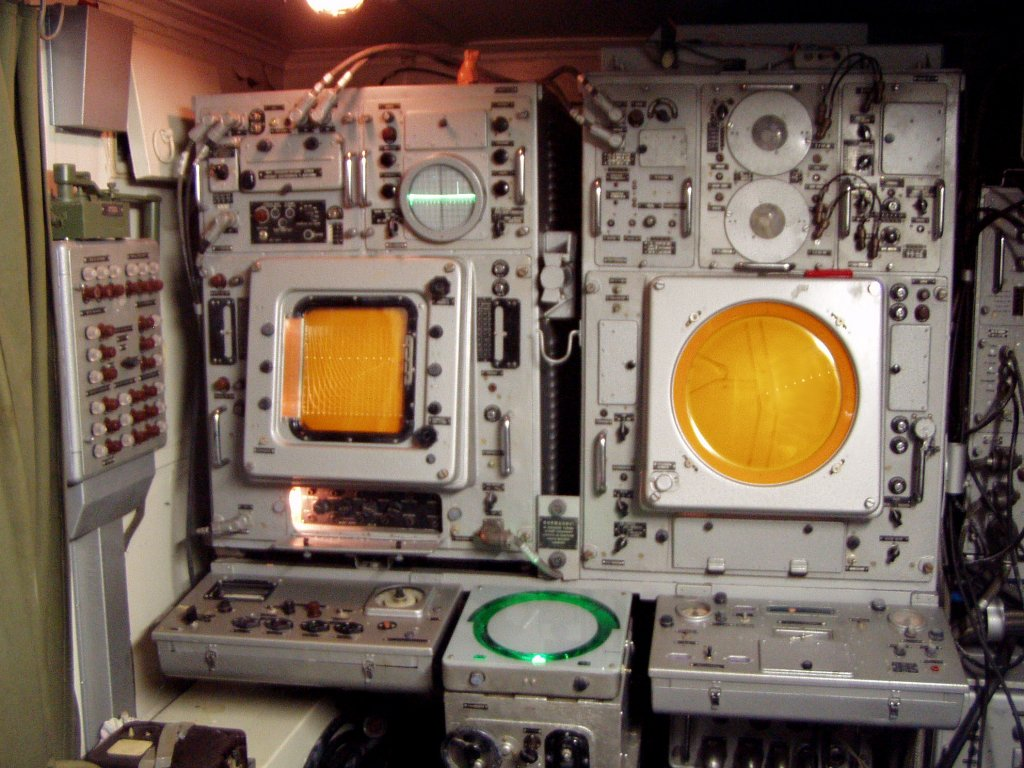
P-12 radar indicators, E-scope left and plan position indicator right

The P-12 "Spoon Rest A" was mounted on two Zil trucks, though later with the P-12NP "Spoon Rest B" the radar antenna mast was mounted on a separate trailer cabin to allow for location away from the other components of the radar site, the P-12NA returned to a track based platform. The P-12 used a single antenna accomplishing both transmission and reception, the antenna was composed of twelve Yagi antenna mounted in sets of six with one set above the other. Azimuth was scanned mechanically by the antenna with a rotation of 10 r.p.m, elevation was determined using a Goniometer by comparing the phase comparison between the upper and lower antenna sets, in similar fashion to the original P-3 but since this reduced range it was rarely used. The P-12 used two indicators, a plan position indicator in addition to an E-scope to indicate height, the P-12 could integrate track information from an additional radar with both sets of information appearing on the plan position indicator A secondary radar for IFF was generally used in conjunction with the P-12 such as the NRZ-12 (NATO "Score Board").

== Variants ==
P-12M – Serbian modernization done by the Military Technical Institute (VTI) in Belgrade together with other defense industry firms, almost everything changed except antenna, complete digital data acquisition and modern displays for better representation of tactical situation to operators including modern data link and remote control. Speed of data processing increased and range extended to 350km.

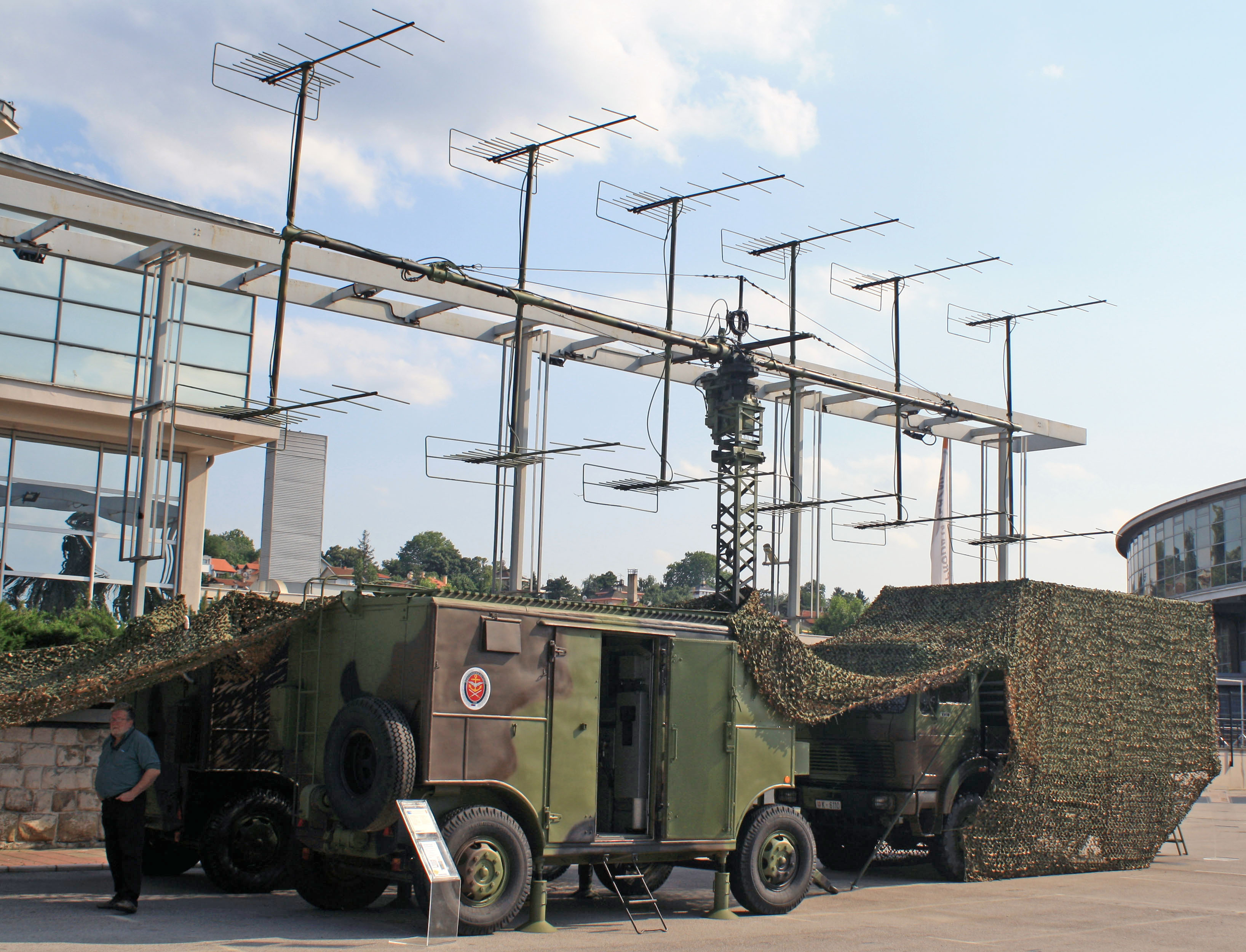
Serbian P-12M modernized radar

== Combat history ==
The P-12 served in both the Vietnam War as well as several conflicts in the Middle East. One particularly notable incident took place during the War of Attrition in 1969 when Israeli commandos captured a P-12 radar station from Egypt in Operation Rooster 53.

== Operators ==
- Angola
- East Germany
- Egypt
- Moldova
- Serbia
- Iran – Operates P-12 derivatives around key sites such as Natanz.
- Soviet Union – The P-12 was operated by the Soviet Union from 1956 but has since become obsolete and retired from service, replaced by more advanced models entering into service after the P-12 such as the P-18 radar.
- Vietnam

== See also ==
- P-10 radar
- P-18 radar
- Russian air surveillance radars
- List of radars
