= 1L121-E =

Russian mobile air defense radar

- Country of origin: Russia
- Designer: Nizhny Novgorod Research Institute of Radio Engineering
- Introduced: 2011
- Type: Mobile 3-D air-defense radar
- Frequency: UHF
- Range: 90 Kilometers
- Azimuth: 20 degrees
- Elevation: 60 Degrees

The 1L121-E is a Russian mobile air defense radar. It was first shown in 2011 at the MAKS Air Show outside Moscow. It was developed by the Nizhny Novgorod Research Institute of Radio Engineering (NNIIRT).

== Description ==
The 1L121-E can be mounted on a wide variety of vehicles including a BTR-80 and a GAZ Vodnik. The 1L121-E gives full hemispheric coverage and is designed to function on the move or while stopped. Moving from stationary to mobile operation requires about two minutes. The radar spots and classifies up to four different target types, positioning each target with an accuracy of 100 meters. with about 1 degree in accuracy for elevation and azimuth. It is mainly designed to detect and track airborne targets including low-level small UAVs.
