= P-30 radar =

Soviet early warning radar

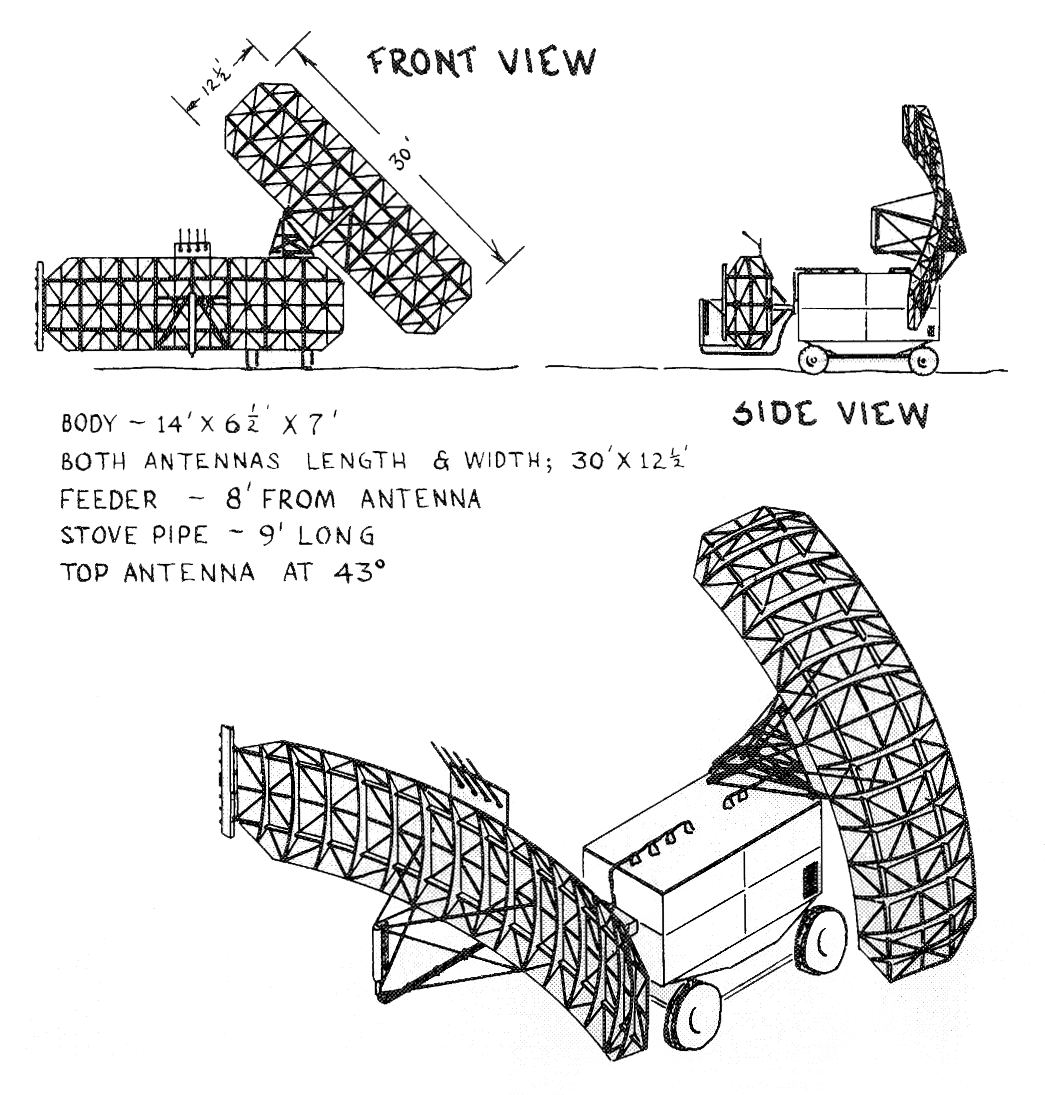
- CIA illustration of a P-30
- Country of origin: Soviet Union
- Introduced: 1955
- Type: Early warning Ground control
- Frequency: E band/F band
- Range: 180 km (112 miles)
- Altitude: 12 km (40,000 feet)
- Azimuth: 360 degrees
- Power: 1 MW

The P-30 "Khrustal" (Russian: Хрусталь; English: crystal), also referred to by the NATO reporting name "Big Mesh" in the west, is a 2D E band/F band radar developed and operated by the former Soviet Union.

== Development ==
The P-30 was developed by the All-Union Scientific Research Institute of Radio Engineering (VNIIRT) as an early warning ground control and interception radar for the Soviet Air Defence Forces, airforce and navy of the Soviet Union. Crystal was a development of an earlier radar design, the P-20 radar with which it shares many similarities. The radar was developed under the direction of chief designer V. Samarin and by 1955 the radar had completed state trials and was accepted into service.

In 1958 the P-30 was upgraded to provide a 10-15% improvement in the detection range as well as improvements to the systems reliability, the modernised variant entered service in 1959 after completion of state trials. The P-30 has now been superseded by its successors, the P-35 and P-37 radar.

== Description ==
The P-30 is a semi-mobile radar consisting of a trailer mounting the control cabin and transmitter equipment, two Zil trucks carrying the power supply equipment and antenna trailers. The antenna system of the P-30 is composed of two open frame truncated parabolic antenna accomplishing both transmission and reception. Both antenna are fed by a stacked beam composed of six feed horns. The radar uses two antenna to determine target altitude by the V-beam system with azimuth scanned mechanically. The upper antenna is tilted to an angle of 25 degrees from horizontal which results in each target appearing twice on the indicator, the distance between the two allows the targets altitude to be approximately estimated by the operator. The left hand side of the lower antenna carried the antenna array of the NRS-20 IFF secondary radar, which was used to identify detected aircraft as friend or foe.

== Variants ==
- P-30-M (NATO reporting name "Big Bar")

== Operators ==
The P-30 was operated by the Soviet Union from 1955 and though they have since become obsolete, they were passed down to successor states after the fall of the Soviet Union. The radar has been exported and continues to serve in some areas around the world.

== See also ==
- P-20 radar
- List of radars
