= P-10 radar =

Soviet long-range radar

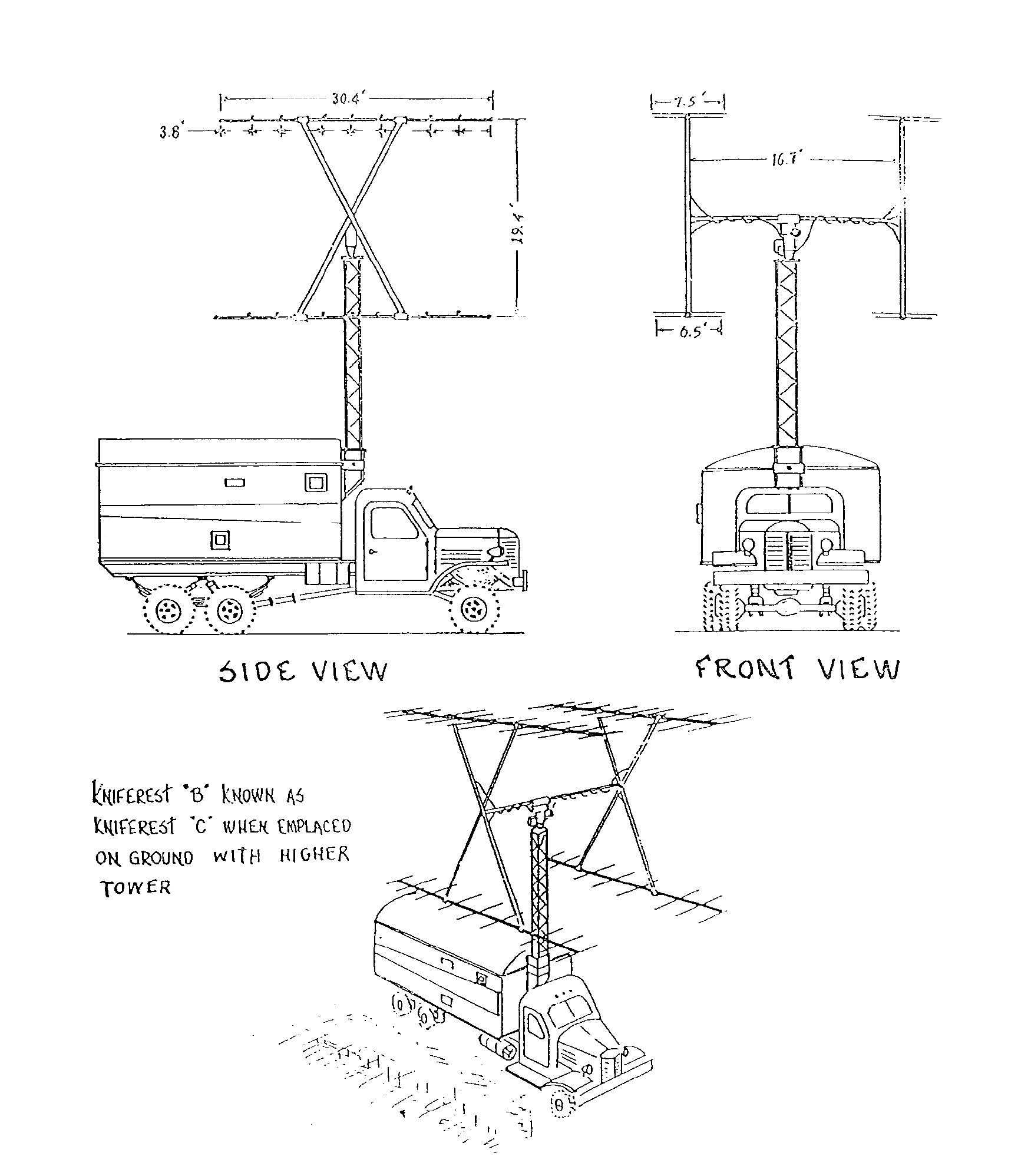
- CIA illustration of a P-10
- Country of origin: Soviet Union
- Introduced: 1953
- Type: Early Warning Ground Control
- Frequency: VHF
- Range: 200-250 km
- Altitude: 15 km
- Azimuth: 360 degrees
- Elevation: 21 degrees
- Precision: <2.5 km range
- Power: 55-100 kW

The "Pegmantit 10" or P-10 (also referred to by the NATO reporting names "Knife Rest B" and "Knife Rest C" in the west) was an early 2D VHF radar developed and operated by the former Soviet Union.

== Development ==
The "Pegmantit 10", which is abbreviated to P-10, was a development of the earlier P-8 radar, itself a development of one of the first early warning and ground control radars to be developed by the former Soviet Union, the P-3 radar. The P-10 radar was developed and successfully tested between 1951 and 1953, incorporating the achievements of the P-8 in addition to many new improvements and was accepted into operational service by the end of 1953. The P-10 was developed by the SKB Design Bureau, a division of State Plant No.197 named after V. I. Lenin and the predecessor of the current Nizhniy Novgorod Research Institute of Radio Engineering (NNIIRT), which developed the previous P-8. Between 1956 and 1957 the P-10 and legacy P-8 radar were equipped with improved clutter suppression equipment allowing for cancellation of clutter moving up to 30 m/s, cancellation was improved by a factor of 5 compared with no cancellation.

== Description ==
The P-10 shares many similarities with the earlier P-8; the P-10 was also mounted in two ZiL trucks. The P-10 used a single antenna accomplishing both transmission and reception, the antenna was composed of four Yagi antennas mounted in sets of two with one set above the other. The antenna mast was mounted directly to the Zil transport truck, previous radar like the P-8 had a free standing mast, the advantage of the P-10 mast was that it could be deployed and stowed much faster than before, improving the mobility of the radar. Azimuth was scanned mechanically by the antenna with elevation determined using a goniometer in similar fashion to the original P-3. The P-10 used a plan position indicator in addition to an A-scope to indicate height, the radar had a maximum power output of up to 100 kW and a pulse width of 4-12 microseconds. A secondary radar for IFF was generally used in conjunction with the P-8 such as the NRS-12 (NATO "Score Board"). In addition to incorporating a means of passive clutter suppression the P-10 was also able to alter its carrier frequency to improve resistance to both passive clutter and active jamming techniques.

The radar could also be emplaced on the ground, on a mast approximately 40 feet (12 m) tall, instead of mounted on a truck. This configuration was known in the west as the "Knife Rest C".

== Operators ==
The P-10 was operated by the Soviet Union from 1953 but has long since become obsolete and retired from service, replaced by more advanced models entering into service after the P-10 such as the P-12 radar.

== See also ==
- P-8 radar
- P-12 radar
- List of radars
