= P-70 radar =

P-70 Radar
- Country of origin: Soviet Union
- Introduced: 1968
- No. built: 11
- Type: Early Warning
- Frequency: VHF
- Range: 2300 km
- Altitude: 160 km
- Azimuth: 360 degrees
- Elevation: 20 degrees
- Power: 17 MW 20 kW average

The P-70 or "Lena-M" was a static 2D VHF radar developed and operated by the former Soviet Union.

== Development ==
The P-70 early warning radar started development in 1960 and was completed in 1968 when the radar completed state testing and was accepted into service. The purpose of the radar was to provide long-range early warning of aircraft over the vast territory of the Soviet Union in support of long-range missile batteries. The P-70 was developed by the SKB Design Bureau, a division of State Plant No. 197 named after V.I.Lenin, the predecessor of the current Nizhniy Novgorod Research Institute of Radio Engineering (NNIIRT). The P-70 had a production run of 11 radar units which were deployed to many different regions within the Soviet Union including Estonia, Kotlas, Lithuania and Rybachy Peninsula in the north-west, Kerch, the North-East Bank and Azerbaijan in the south, Mongolia and Russian Island in the east and Anadyr in the north-east.

== Description ==
The P-70 radar was designed as a static structure mounted on a two-story building which housed the radar and power supply equipment as well as facilities for the radar operators.

Additional support facilities could be operated up to 2 km from the radar building.

The radar used a single large antenna accomplishing both transmission and reception with a surface area of 850 m^{2} and with dimensions of 48 by 25 meters. The antenna was of the open-frame truncated parabolic variety and was scanned mechanically in azimuth using hydraulics.

P-70 radars were dual-channel, with the antenna working in both horizontal and vertical polarization. The radar was one of the first mass-produced radars to use pulse compression. The use of these techniques gave the P-70 excellent resolution (by a factor of 10 compared with the P-14) at long range, as well providing protection against active and passive interference. The radar operated at two repetition frequencies, 140 Hz to observe low-altitude targets (aircraft and missiles) and 70 Hz to observe high-altitude targets (satellites). The P-70 also used a fully coherent transmitter and an MTI system capable of compensating for wind and other forms of passive interference such as chaff. Overall, the P-70 managed to achieve a low false alarm rate.

== Operators ==
The P-70 radar was operated by the Soviet Union from 1968. The radars were not exported and are believed to be no longer in operation.

- Soviet Union - Passed to successor states.

== Popular culture ==
=== Video games ===
- Arma 3, as a decorative object named "Radar Complex" release with Contact expansion July 25, 2019. Located on terrain Livonia at the old Swarog radar station, in-game coordinates 049-021. Can be placed manually in the game editor Eden Editor via two assets "Radar Complex (Antenna)" and "Radar Complex (Antenna Base)".
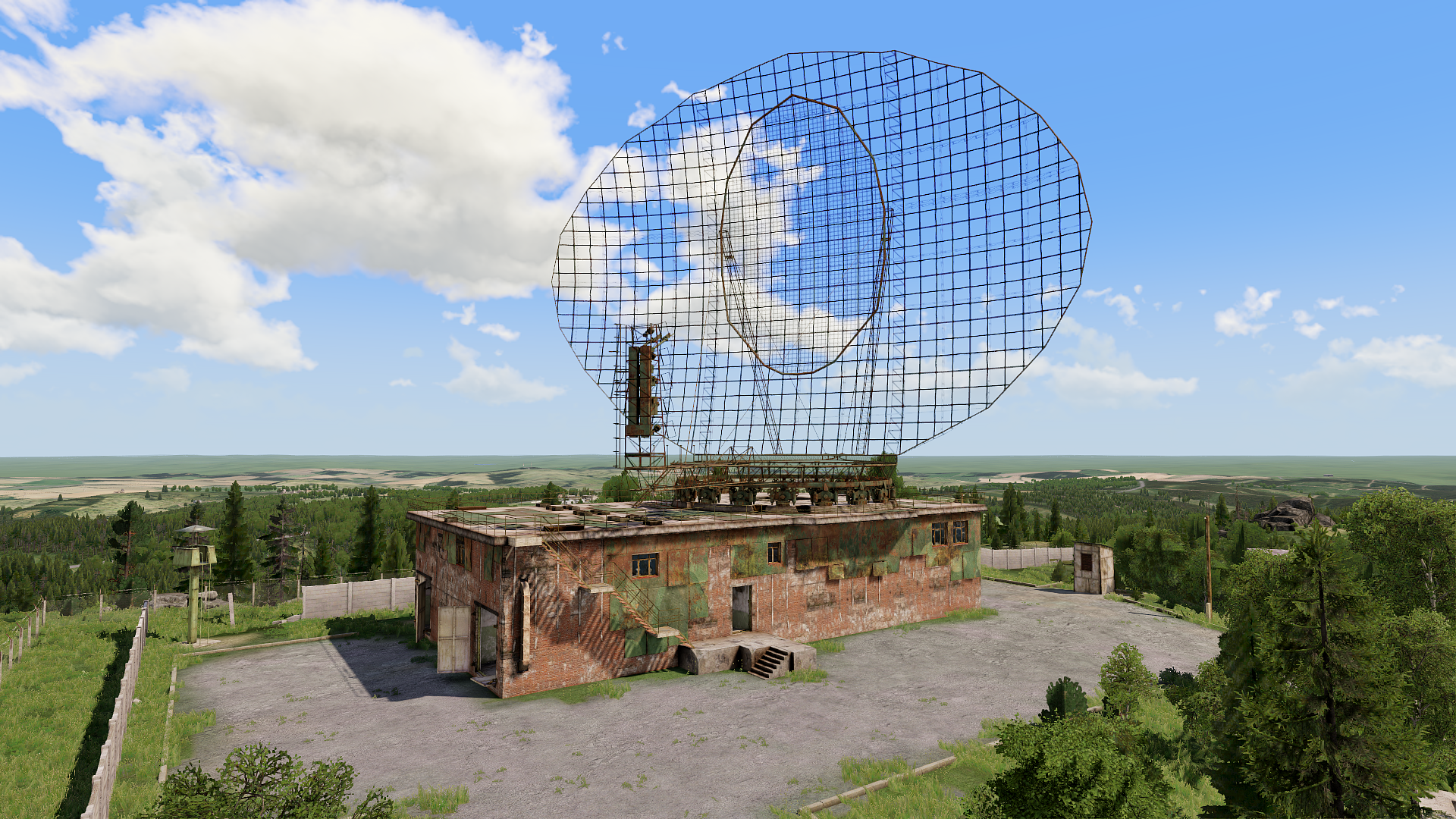
  P-70 "Lena-M" radar station in game Arma 3, Livonia terrain

== See also ==
- List of radars
