= P-8 radar =

Soviet long-range radar

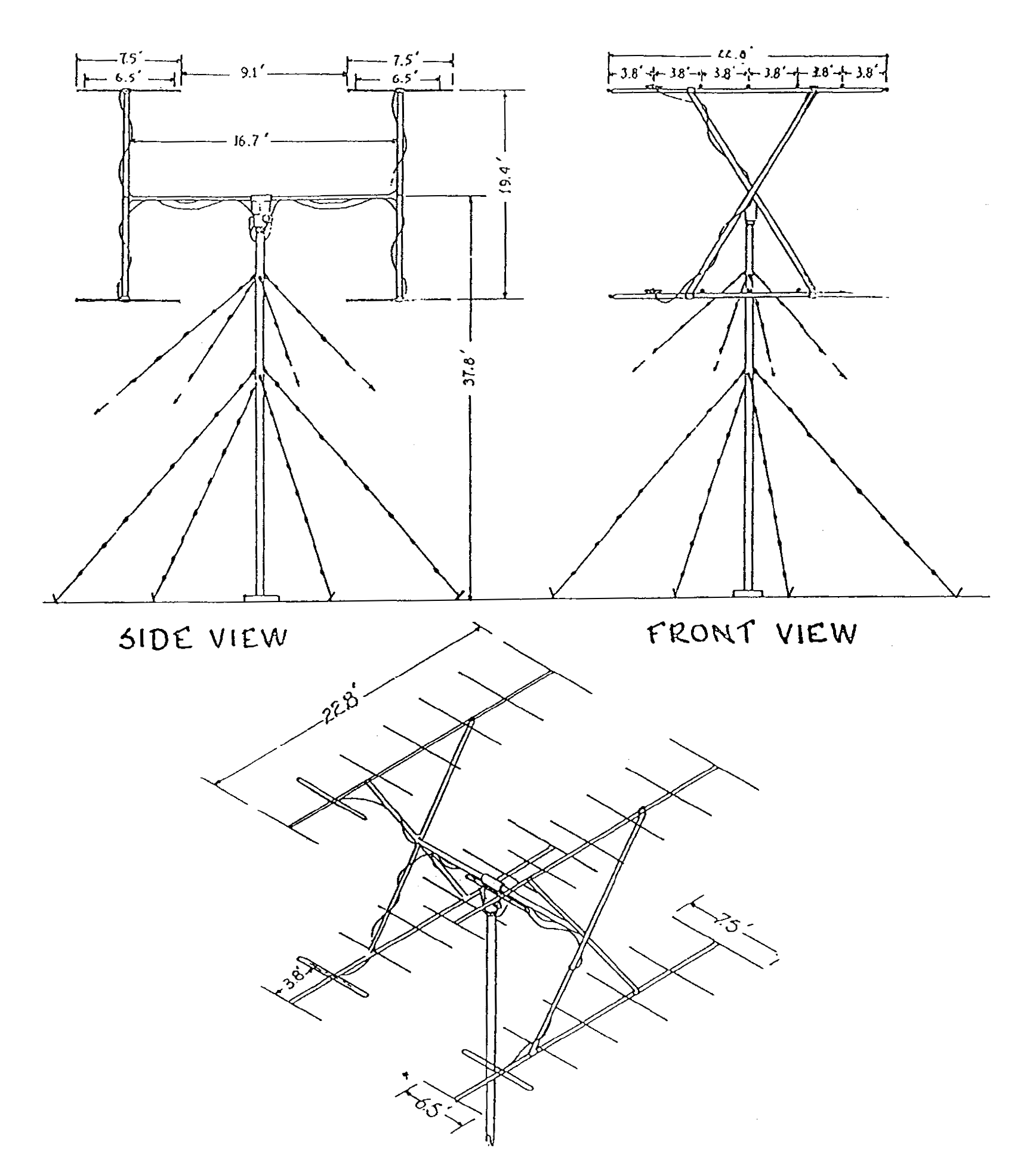
- CIA illustration of a P-8
- Country of origin: Soviet Union
- Introduced: 1950
- Type: Early Warning Ground Control
- Frequency: VHF
- Range: 150-250 km
- Altitude: 8-10 km
- Azimuth: 360 degrees
- Elevation: 24 degrees
- Precision: <2.5 km range
- Power: 70-75 kW

The "Pegmantit 8" or P-8 (also referred to by the NATO reporting name "Knife Rest A" in the west) was an early 2D VHF radar developed and operated by the former Soviet Union.

== Development ==
The "Pegmantit 8", which is abbreviated to P-8, was a development of one of the first early warning and ground control radars to be developed by the former Soviet Union, the P-3 radar. The radar was developed and successfully tested between 1949 and 1950, demonstrating a detection range of 150 km against a target aircraft at 8 km altitude and was accepted into operational service. The P-8 was developed by the SKB Design Bureau, a division of State Plant No.197 named after V. I. Lenin who developed the previous P-3, the predecessor of the current Nizhniy Novgorod Research Institute of Radio Engineering (NNIIRT). The development of the P-8 radar won the team responsible for its introduction the state prize.

In 1951 the P-8 radar underwent a significant modification which boosted the detection range to 250 km against a target flying at an altitude of 10 km, the target detection range of low altitude targets was also improved by a factor of 60-70%. Between 1956 and 1957 the P-10 and legacy P-8 radar were equipped with improved clutter suppression equipment allowing for cancellation of clutter moving up to 30 m/s, cancellation was improved by a factor of 5 compared with no cancellation.

== Description ==
The P-8 being a development of the earlier P-3 shares many similarities with the earlier system, like the P-3M (mobile variant) the P-8 was mounted in two ZiL trucks. The P-8 used a single antenna accomplishing both transmission and reception which rotated at a speed of 2 r.p.m. The antenna was composed of four Yagi antennas mounted in sets of two with one set above the other atop a 30-meter mast. Azimuth was scanned mechanically by the antenna with elevation determined using a goniometer in similar fashion to the P-3. The P-8 was one of the first Russian radars to incorporate a means of clutter suppression, a coherent oscillator in the receiver circuit acted as a simple moving target indicator to eliminate passive interference like ground clutter. The P-8 was also the first Russian radar to use a plan position indicator in addition to an A-scope to indicate height, the radar had a maximum power output of up to 75 kW and a receiver sensitivity of 7 mV.

== Operators ==
The P-8 was operated by the Soviet Union from 1950 but has long since become obsolete and retired from service, replaced by more advanced models entering into service after the P-8 such as the P-10 radar.

== See also ==
- P-3 radar
- P-10 radar
- List of radars
