= P-35 radar =

Soviet air defense radar

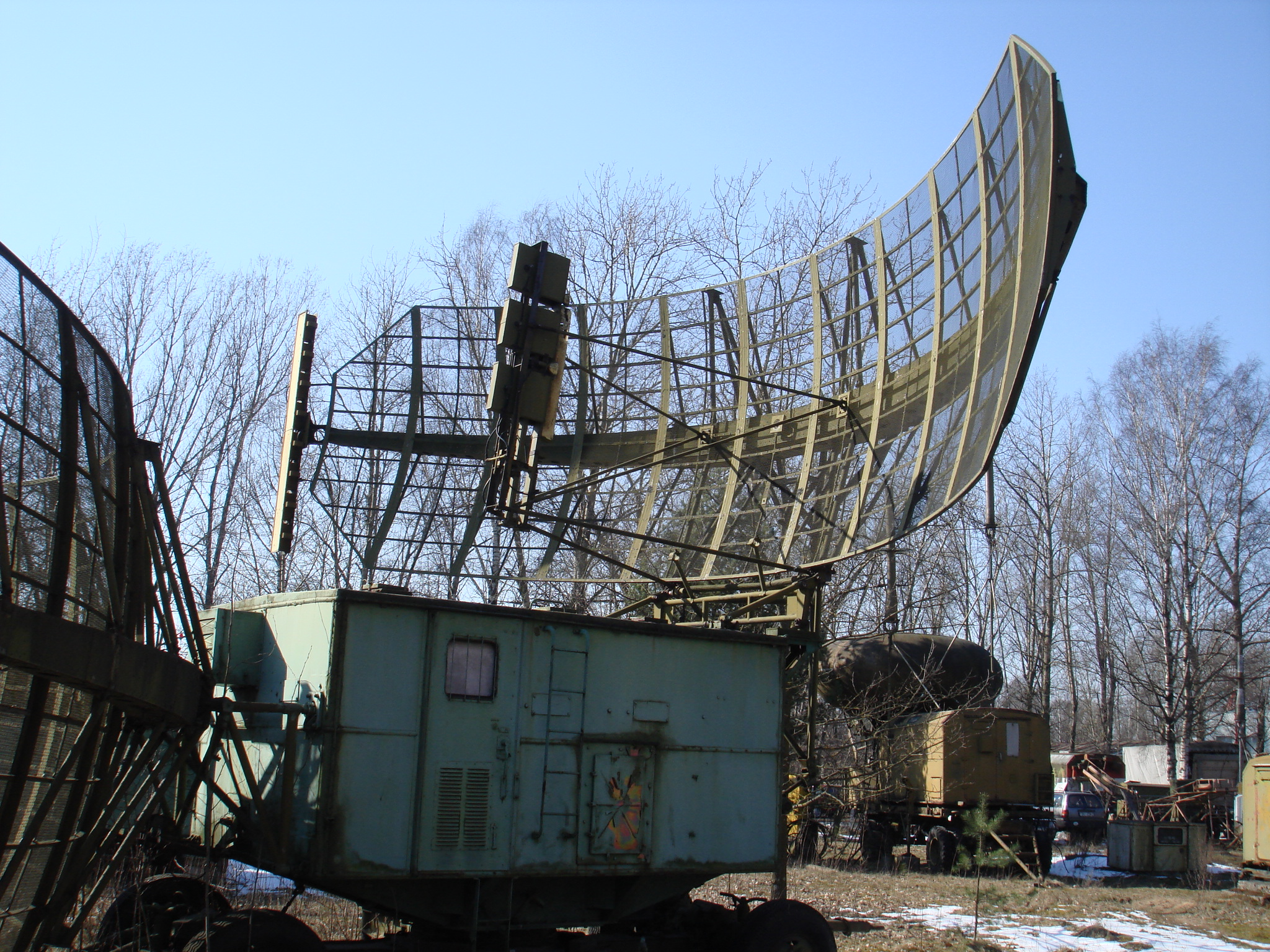
- P-35M radar in Latvia
- Country of origin: Soviet Union
- Introduced: 1958
- Type: Early-warning radar ground control.
- Frequency: E band/F band
- PRF: 375 pps
- Beamwidth: 0.7°
- Pulsewidth: 1.5-4.5 microseconds
- RPM: 7 rpm
- Range: 350 km (217 mi)
- Altitude: 25,000 m (82,021 ft)
- Azimuth: 360 degrees
- Precision: 500 m (1,640 ft) range; 0.5° azimuth
- Power: 6 x 1 MW
- Other names: Bar Lock

The P-35 (Russian: "Сатурн"; English: Saturn), also referred to by the NATO reporting name "Bar Lock" in the west, is a 2D E band/F band radar developed and operated by the former Soviet Union.

== Development ==
The P-30 was developed by the All-Union Scientific Research Institute of Radio Engineering (VNIIRT) as an early warning ground control and interception radar for the Soviet Air Defence Forces, airforce, and navy of the Soviet Union. Saturn was a development of an earlier radar design, the P-30 radar with which it shares many similarities. By 1958 the radar had completed state trials and was accepted into service, offering improved detection range and reliability than the previous P-30.

In 1961 an improved variant of the P-35 was developed, the P-35M, which featured an improved antenna layout. By 1971 a new variant of the P-35 had entered service, Mech-35. The Mech-35 upgrade featured faster scanning and an improved antenna layout and polarization filters to help eliminate passive interference and improve detection of targets flying below 300 meters. Mech-35 also incorporated a limited capability to modulate pulse duration and frequency to counter active jamming. The P-35 has now been succeeded by its successor, the P-37 radar.

== Description ==
The P-35 is a semi-mobile radar composed of a trailer mounting the control cabin and antenna equipment, equipment being transported by truck. The antenna system of the P-35 is composed of two open frame truncated parabolic antenna accomplishing both transmission and reception, with both antenna fed by a stacked beam composed of six feed horns. The radar uses two antenna with azimuth scanned mechanically, but unlike the previous P-30 both antenna are horizontal, the radar not using the V-beam system to determine target altitude. The right hand side of the upper antenna carried the antenna array of the IFF secondary radar, which was used to identify detected aircraft as friend or foe.

== Operators ==
The P-35 was operated by the Soviet Union from 1958 and though they have since become obsolete, they were passed down to successor states after the fall of the Soviet Union. The radar has been exported and continues to serve in some areas around the world.

Czechoslovak People's Army operated P-35 in 1980's.

== See also ==
- P-30 radar
- P-37 radar
- List of radars
