= Nebo-M =

Russian military radar system

Nebo-M Небо-М
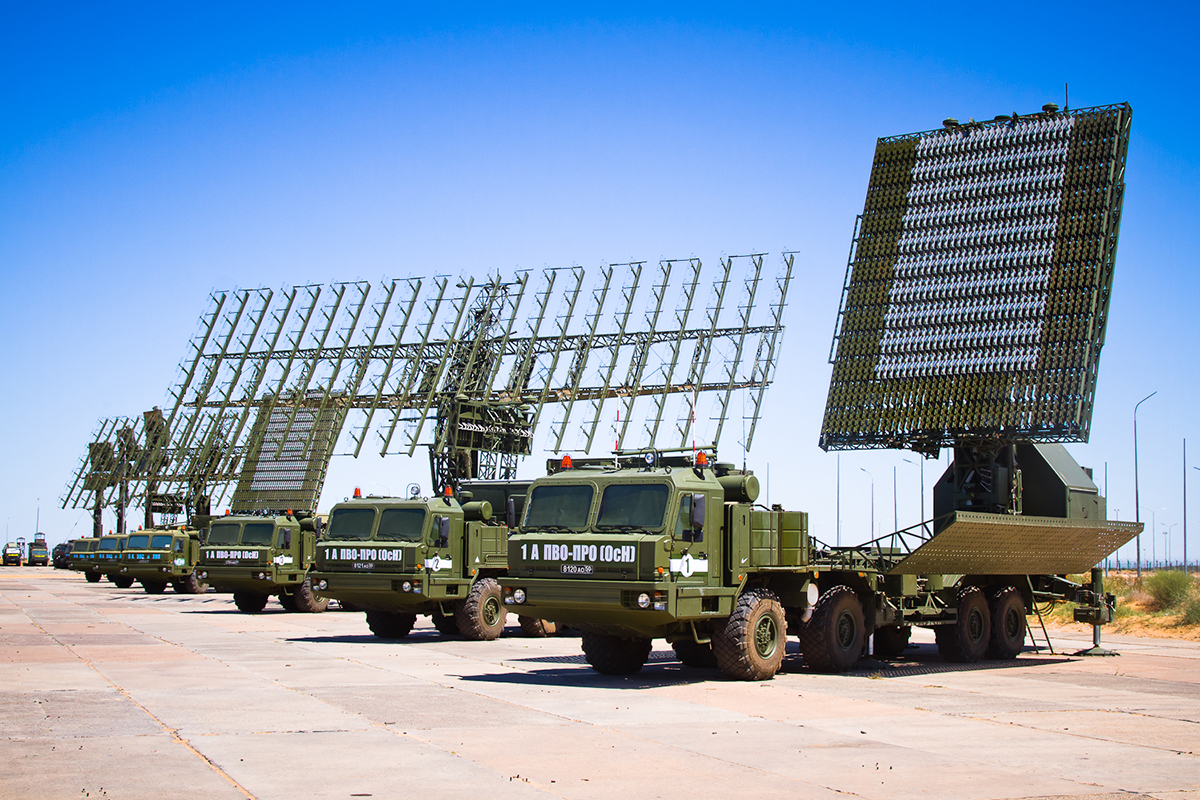
- Nebo-M
- Country of origin: Russia
- Introduced: 2011
- Frequency: VHF, UHF, L and X band
- Range: 3,800 km (2,400 mi) newest domestic version; 600–1,800 km (370–1,120 mi) export version
- Altitude: 600–1,200 km (370–750 mi)
- Azimuth: 360°
- Power: different for individual components

The Nebo-M or Nebo-ME (in Cyrillic: 55Ж6МЕ «Небо-МЕ», Nebo means "sky") also known as RLM-ME or 55Zh6ME (export version) is an integrated multi-functional radar system that features a multiple programmable multi-band design radars and a central data fusion. The radar complex is made up of a command post module and one to three different radars which are deployed on separate 8x8 24-ton trucks. The radar system claims to be able to detect 5th generation aircraft like the F-22 and the F-35 as well as detect long-range ballistic missile launches. Nebo-ME is an export version with some downgraded characteristics.

== History ==
Design was initiated on a mobile chassis in 1999, after NATO countries intervened in the Federal Republic of Yugoslavia, in which the stealth F-117 participated - one was shot down by S-125 Neva with help of P-18 radar, and as a result, Russia started to perceive stealth aircraft as a possible future threat to their security. To counter that threat, they deemed that detection of such aircraft had to be made possible at greater ranges. Production started in 2010 and the system was tested on training grounds in 2011. It was publicly presented in 2012. In 2012–2013 deliveries started to the Russian Armed Forces.

== Composition and description ==
As a system, Nebo-M is a complex which features different radars. From the beginning, Nebo-M represented a modification and modernization of the older VHF band based Nebo SVU, L-band Protivnik G, and S/X-band Gamma S1 radars on mobile chassis. The designations of the newer variants are RLM-S, RLM-D, RLM-M, and the command post KU-RLK. The full system with the maximum number of radars can be deployed in 40 minutes. At minimum deployment with one radar, the system cannot achieve full range or detect all types of air objects, however it can still trace stealth aircraft if deployed with an RLM-M. All radars from Nebo-M system can be used separately for independent deployment, or as pairs.

Nebo-M can exchange observed information with anti-aircraft missile systems like the Pantsir missile system, S-300, S-400 or others in order to guide them towards threats.

- RLM-M (in Cyrillic: «РЛМ-М» «РЛС метрового диапазона») or 55Zh6UME (export version RLM-ME) or Nebo-U and modernized variant Nebo-UM is 3-D VHF and UHF acquisition radar and the main component of the Nebo-M system. It is the successor to the old 1L13 Nebo "Box Spring" radar and is easy to distinguish from it as the direction of polarization is vertical rather than horizontal. It has a range of 600 km (370 mi) and can track objects flying as fast as Mach 6.4.

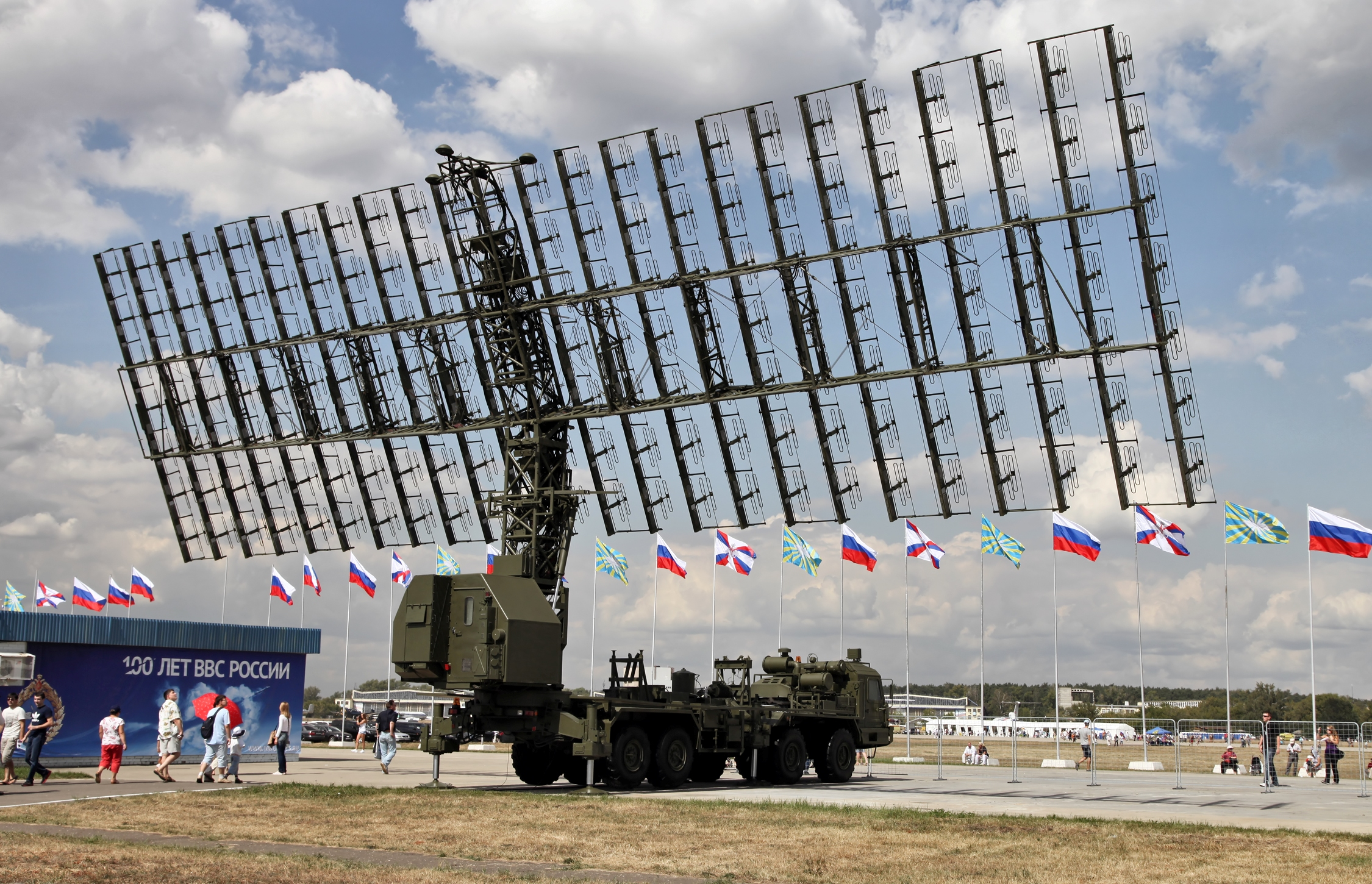
RLM-M Radar

- RLM-D (in Cyrillic: «РЛМ-Д» «РЛС дециметрового диапазона») or 55Zh6ME (export version RLM-DE) is a L-band active electronically scanned array (AESA) mobile radar system based on the older Protivnik G radar and is tasked to conduct air surveillance on chassis of БАЗ-6909-015. It can track targets at ranges up to 600 km (370 mi) and that fly at a radial speed of up to 18000 km/h.

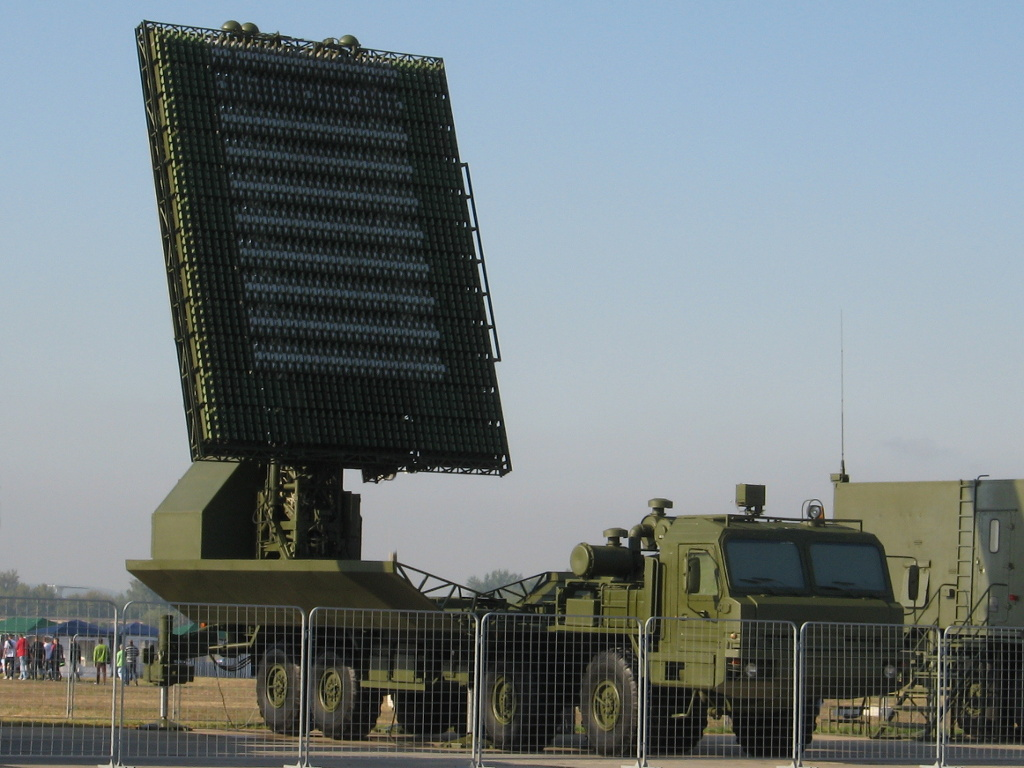
RLM-D Radar

- RLM-S (in Cyrillic: «РЛМ-С» «РЛС сантиметрового диапазона») or in export version RLM-SE also known as GAMMA-S is a X-band active electronically scanned array (AESA) mobile radar system based on the older Gamma S1 64Л6 radar designed to conduct air surveillance on chassis of БАЗ-6909-015.

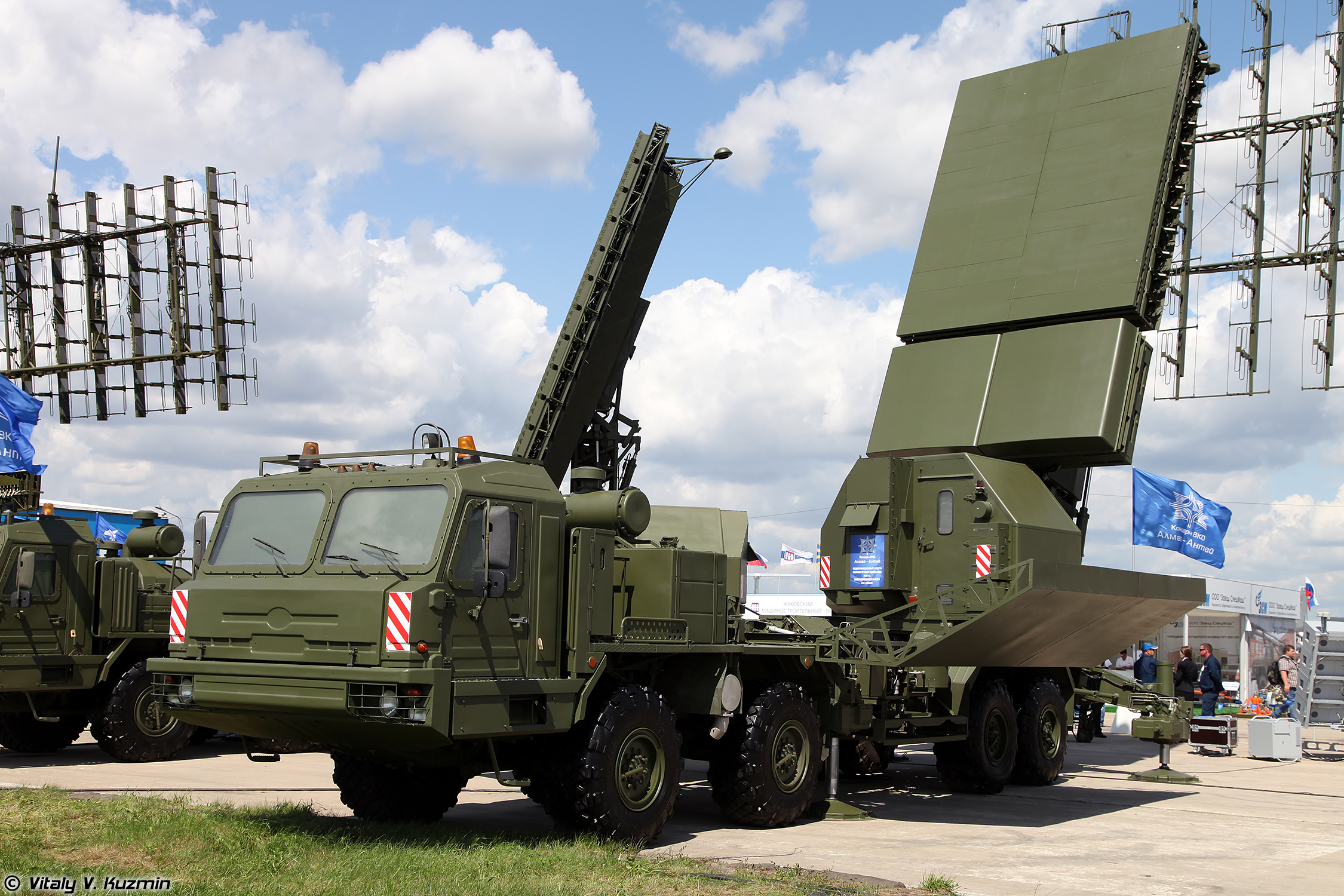
RLM-S Radar

- KU-RLK (in Cyrillic: «КУ РЛК») is a command post that fuses all information's from different types of radar in a single radar picture. It is based on the older Fundament-1E command post and is on БАЗ-6909-015 chassis.

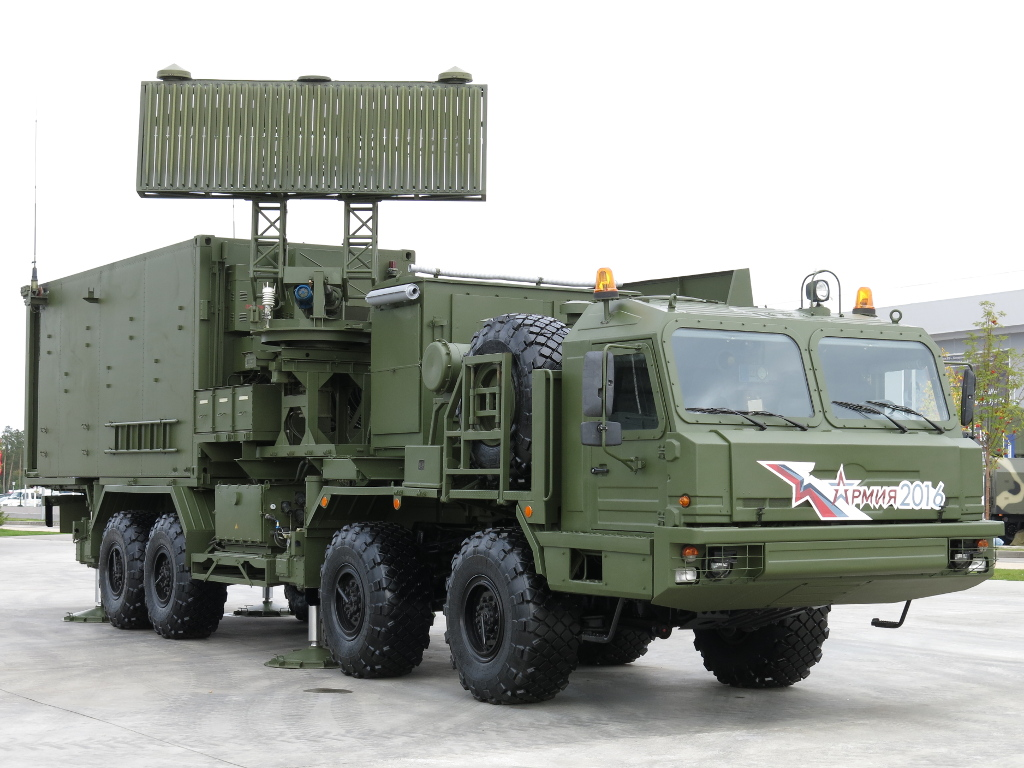
KU-RLK Command post

== Operational deployments ==
The first two Nebo-M regiments were deployed in 2017 to Saint Petersburg and Karelia. In 2018, further two regiments were deployed to Crimea and Penza. In 2019, a regiment was delivered to the Volga region. In 2020, two regiments were deployed to the Far East and Naryan Mar.

Another modernization of Nebo radar, Nebo-UM, a mobile 3D radar that works in meter range only, is being delivered to the Russian air force since 2018. In 2018, a regiment was delivered to Voronezh and Novosibirsk and in 2020 to Rostov-on-Don. It is complement to the Rezonans-NE fixed meter-range radars, that have been constructed in the Arctic in Zapolyarniy, Indiga, Shoyna and Nova Zemlya, with another in Gremikha under construction.

Other sources report deliveries of Nebo-M and Nebo-UM radars in 2015 to the Eastern military district.

Different components of Nebo-M were deployed in Syria, where they were reported to have been used to track, among others, F-35 and F-22 (although the reports were from Russian sources).

Ukrainian media claimed that Ukraine had blown up the radar system consisting of Nebo-M and Kasta-2E.

On October 3, 2024, Ukrainian forces claimed to have destroyed a Nebo-M radar using an ATACMS missile; the location of the attack was not specified.

In October 2025 Ukrainian forces from Lasar’s Group of the National Guard of Ukraine and the 73rd Naval Special Operations Center claimed to have destroyed three Nebo-M radars stationed on Crimean, using a maritime drone carrier.

== Operators ==
- Russia
- Armenia
- India
