= Nizhny Novgorod Research Institute of Radio Engineering =

Russian electronics company

- Type: Open joint-stock company
- Founded: 1947
- Headquarters: Nizhny Novgorod, Russia
- Parent: Almaz-Antey
- Website: nniirt.ru

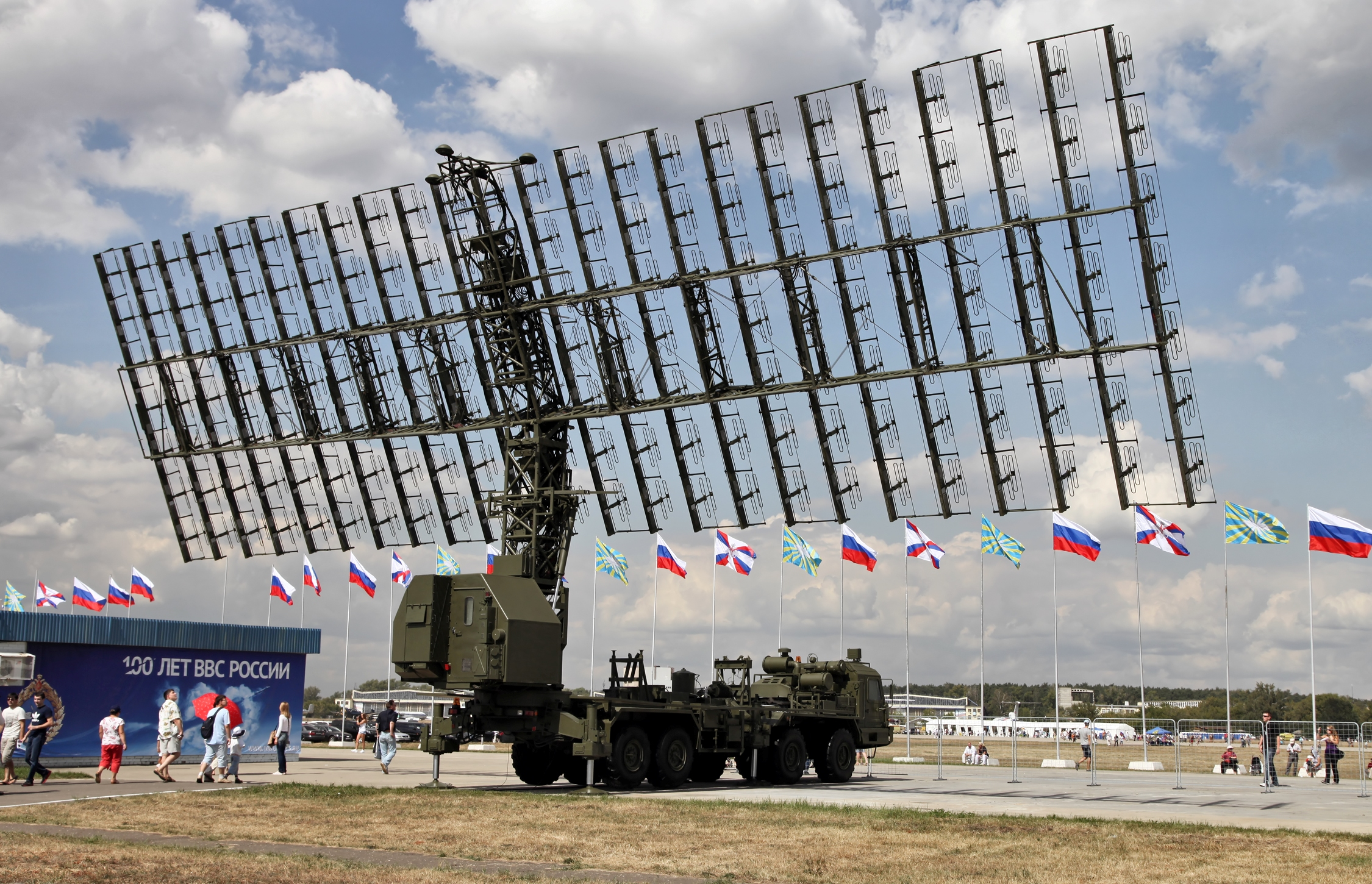
55Zh6M Nebo-M mobile multiband radar system, developed by NNIIRT

The Nizhny Novgorod Research Institute of Radio Engineering (NNIIRT) is a Russian electronics company specializing in the development and manufacturing of radar equipment. It is a subsidiary of the Almaz-Antey group.

== History ==
Founded in 1947, NNIIRT is based in the city of Nizhny Novgorod.

Beginning in 1975, NNIIRT developed the first VHF 3D radar capable of measuring height, range, and azimuth to a target. This effort produced the 55Zh6 'Nebo' VHF surveillance radar, which passed acceptance trials in 1982.

In the post–Cold War era, NNIIRT developed the 55Zh6 Nebo U 'Tall Rack' radar, which has been integrated with the SA-21 anti-aircraft weapons system. This system is deployed around Moscow.

In 2013, NNIIRT announced the further development of the 55Zh6UME Nebo-UME, which combines VHF and L band radars on a single assembly.

== NNIIRT designed air surveillance radars ==
The Nizhny Novgorod Research Institute of Radio Engineering (Russian acronym: NNIIRT) has since 1948 developed a number of radars.

Other innovations were radars with frequency hopping; the P-10 Volga A (NATO: KNIFE REST B) in 1953, radars with transmitter signal coherency and special features like moving target indicator (MTI); the P-12 Yenisei (NATO: SPOON REST) in 1955, as well as the P-70 Lena-M with chirp signal modulation in 1968.

| Radar | NATO reporting name | Radio spectrum (NATO) | Developed | Production plant | Notes |
|---|---|---|---|---|---|
| P-3 | | VHF | 1948 | NITEL | The first Soviet post-World War II air surveillance radar |
| P-8 Volga | KNIFE REST A | VHF | 1950 | NITEL | The first Soviet radar with circular scan |
| P-10 Volga A | KNIFE REST B | VHF | 1953 | NITEL | Frequency hopping |
| P-12 Yenisei | SPOON REST | VHF | 1955 | NITEL | Coherent radar with MTI |
| P-14 Lena | TALL KING | VHF | 1959 | NITEL | |
| P-70 Lena-M | | VHF | 1968 | | First Soviet radar with chirp |
| P-18 Terek | SPOON REST D | VHF | 1970 | NITEL | |
| 5N84A Oborona-14 | TALL KING C | VHF | 1974 | NITEL | |
| 5N69 Salute | BIG BACK | D-band | 1975 | | First Soviet 3D-radar |
| 44Zh6 | TALL KING B | VHF | 1979 | NITEL | Stationary version of Oborona-14 |
| 55Zh6 Nebo | TALL RACK | VHF | 1982 | NITEL | First Soviet meter-wavelength 3D-radar |
| 1L13 | | | 1982 | | |
| 1L121-E | | UHF | 2011 | | |
| 52E6 | | VHF | 1982–1996 | | |
| 1L13-3 Nebo-SV | BOX SPRING | VHF | 1985 | NITEL | |
| 55ZH6U Nebo-U | TALL RACK | VHF | 1992 | NITEL | |
| 1L119 Nebo-SVU | | VHF | 1997–2006 | | |
| 59N6-1 Protivnik-G1 | | D-band | 1997 | | Average time between failures 840 hours |
| 1L122 Avtobaza | | D-band | 1997–2006 | | |
| 52E6MU | | VHF | 1997–2006 | | |
| P-18 modernisation kits | SPOON REST D | VHF | 1997–2006 | | |
| 55ZH6M Nebo-M | | VHF/multi-band | 2011 | | |
| 59N6M | | | | | |

== Management ==
- Tyulin Valery Evgenievich — General Director;
- Tsyganov Maxim Alexandrovich — Deputy General Director for General Issues;
- Fomin Andrey Vladimirovich — Deputy General Director for Production;
- Cherney Pyotr Ivanovich — Deputy General Director for Quality;
- Solonina Alyona Alexandrovna — Deputy General Director for Financial and Economic Affairs;
- Sadovnikova Olga Alexandrovna — Chief Accountant;
- Frantsev Mikhail Yevtifeevich — Deputy General Director — Chief Engineer.
