= P-18 radar =

Soviet early warning radar

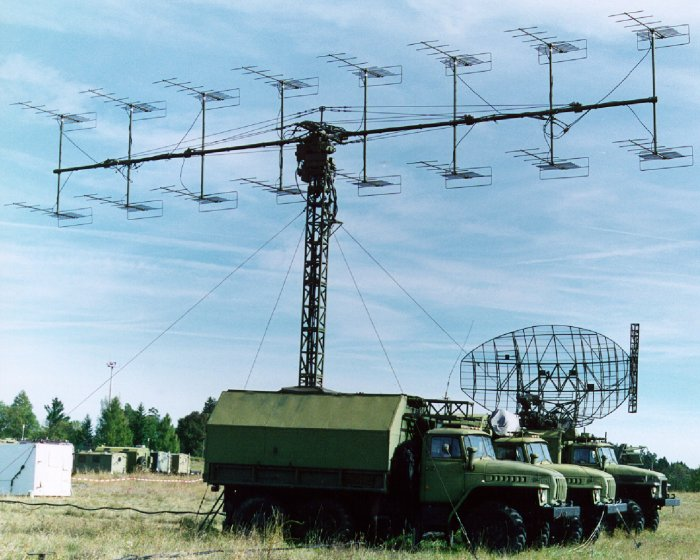
- P-18 radar in Germany with Parol IFF
- Country of origin: Soviet Union
- Introduced: 1970
- Type: Early warning radar
- Frequency: VHF
- Range: 250 km (160 mi)
- Altitude: 35 km (22 mi)
- Azimuth: 360°
- Elevation: −5°–+15°
- Precision: 1 km (0.6 mi) (range)
- Power: 260 kW

The P-18 or 1RL131 Terek (also referred to by the NATO reporting name "Spoon Rest D" in the west) is a 2D VHF radar developed and operated by the former Soviet Union.

== Development ==
The P-18 early warning radar is a development of the earlier P-12 radar, the P-18 radar being accepted into service in 1970 following the successful completion of the program. The P-18 was developed by the SKB Design Bureau, a division of State Plant No.197 named after V. I. Lenin who developed the previous P-12, the predecessor of the current Nizhny Novgorod Research Institute of Radio Engineering (NNIIRT). In 1979 a new secondary IFF radar the 1L22 "Parol" entered into service to complement the P-18, unlike the previous secondary radar NRS-12 (NATO "Score Board") the new interrogator was carried on a separate truck.

The P-18 is still in service today and was widely exported, many companies offer upgrade options to improve the performance and reliability of the radar and to replace out-dated components. NNIIRT offers an upgrade package for the P-18 which includes the installation of a solid state transmitter and receiver, automatic jammer suppression equipment as well as PC based signal processing, test and interface equipment. These upgraded variants of the P-18 can be referred to as the P-18M, P-18-1 or P-18-2 depending on the manufacturer, modification and radar nationality. The P-18 was superseded by the 1L13 "Nebo" VHF surveillance radar in 1984. Currently, the Russian-Belarusian company Defense Systems provides upgrades for P-18 radars. Also Retia, a Czech civil and military electronics company, developed its own, fundamental modernisation of the P-18 under the name ReVEAL. It is now solid state, digitized and fitted with upgraded IFF system, while allowing to utilise also the legacy IFF. The whole equipment is repackaged into a standard container and already sold in several dozen units.

== Description ==
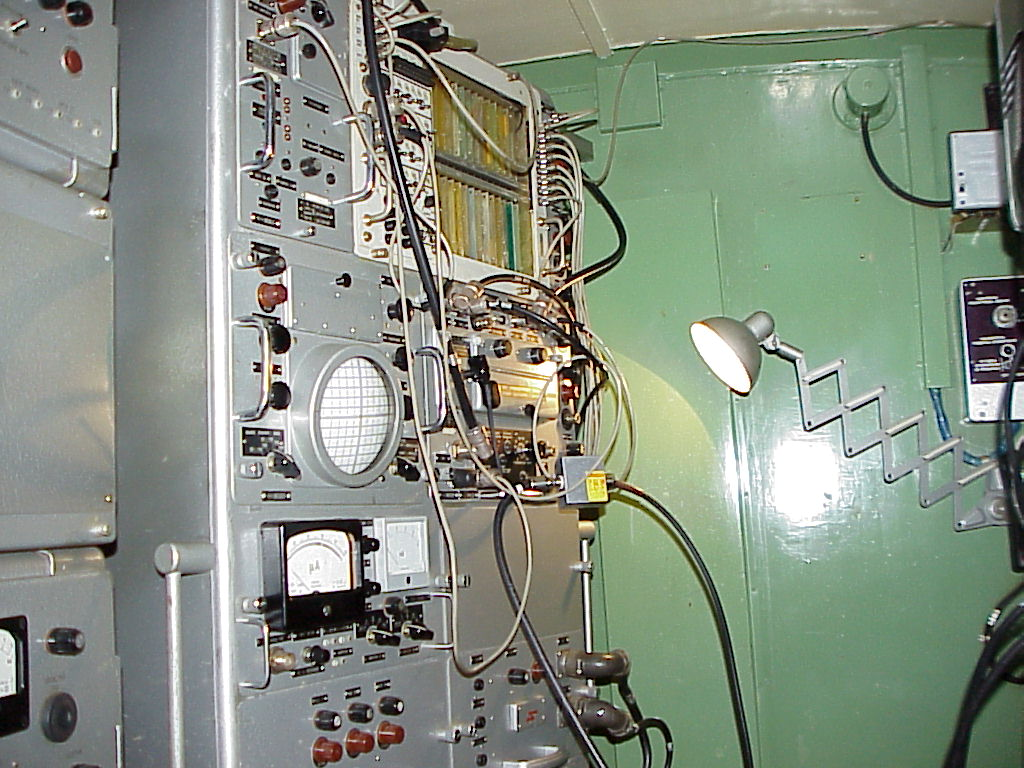
P-18 receiver with digital MTI (top left)

The P-18 shares many similarities with the earlier P-12NA and like the P-12 it is mounted on two Ural-4320 truck chassis. The P-18 features many improvements over the P-12 including increased performance, precision and reliability. The radar was developed to work independently or as part of a C3 system directing SAM and aircraft to hostile targets, the truck mounted design provided the radar with high mobility.

The P-18 uses a single antenna accomplishing both transmission and reception. The antenna is composed of sixteen Yagi antennas mounted in sets of eight with one set above the other. The radar antenna is mounted on the truck used to transport it improving mobility and the radar also features a mechanism which allows the antenna height and elevation to be altered during operation. Azimuth is scanned mechanically by the antenna with a rotation of 10 r.p.m, the original P-18 used three indicators, including two plan position indicators in addition to a back-up A-scope. Like the P-12 the radar features automatic frequency control with four pre-set operating frequencies, moving target indicator to eliminate passive clutter and active jamming, the radar could also display tracks from another radar it was paired with. The original P-18 used a coaxial cavity resonator transmitter, vacuum tube receiver with transistor based preamplifier and a vacuum tube/pin diode based duplexer. A secondary radar for IFF is generally used in conjunction with the P-18, either the NRS-12 or the later 1L22 "Parol".

== Variants ==
There are a few modifications and variants of the P-18 radar that allow it to be still in use and most of them substantially extend original capabilities.

=== P-18PL (Poland) ===
P-18PL
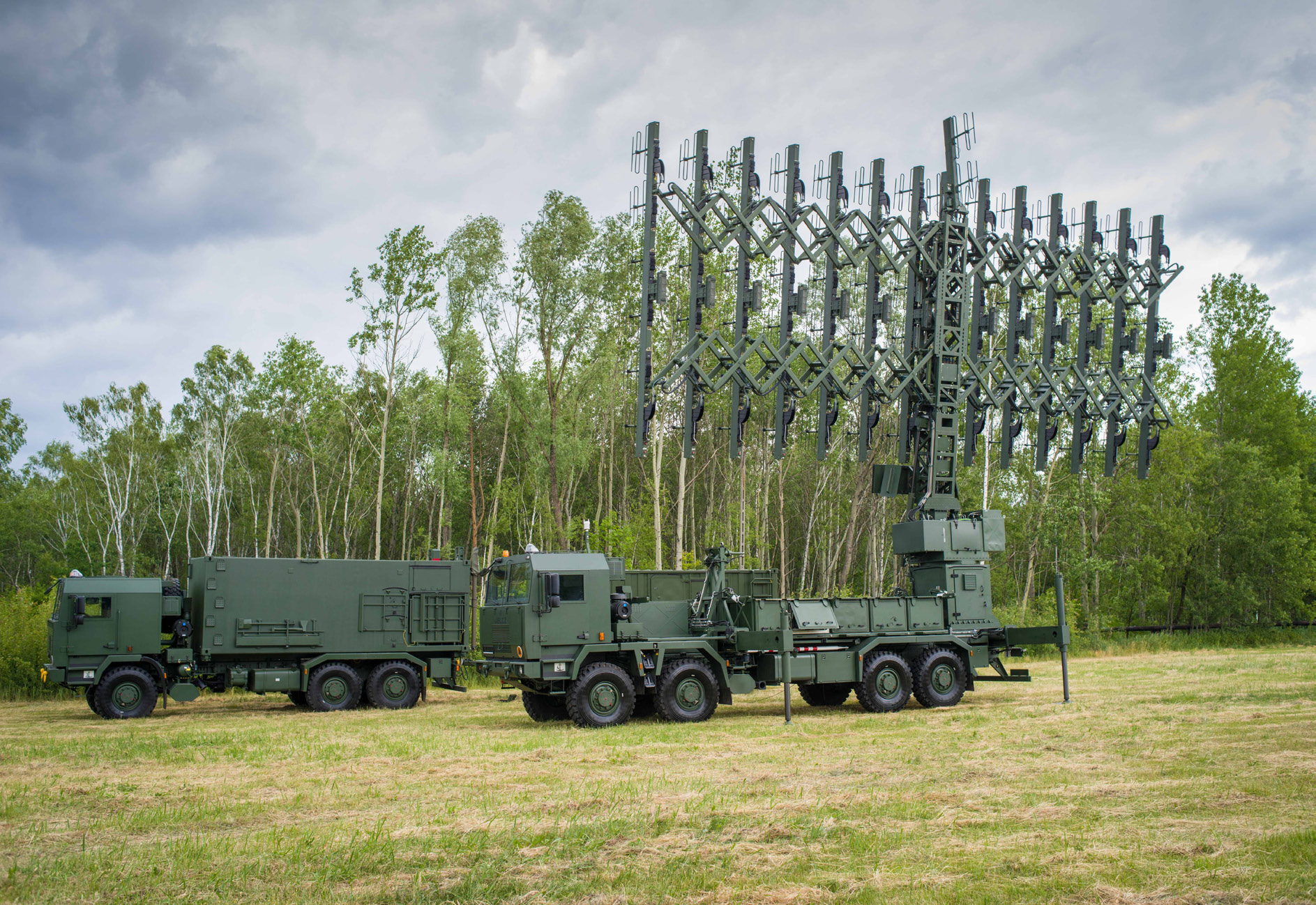
- Country of origin: Poland
- Manufacturer: PIT-Radwar
- Introduced: 2023
- Type: Early warning radar
- Frequency: VHF (30 to 300 MHz)
- RPM: up to 10
- Range: 900 km (560 mi) or 600 km (370 mi)
- Altitude: 160 km (99 mi) or 120 km (75 mi)
- Height: 6 m (20 ft)
- Width: 14 m (46 ft)
- Azimuth: 360° (antenna rotation) or 90° (stationary; AESA)
- Elevation: 25° or 45° (360° rotation) 0–40° or 0–50° (90° AESA)
- Precision: 30 m (98 ft) in range and 0.3° in azimuth

The P-18PL is a modernized Polish road-mobile, long-range, three-dimensional (3D), very high frequency (VHF) early warning radar with an active electronically scanned array (AESA) technology. The radar is particularly remarkable for its enhanced anti-stealth capability and is somewhat similar to the Russian Nebo-SVU radar.

Key features:

- Operation in the VHF (meter band) range, which significantly enhances the detection capabilities against targets that employ contemporary stealth techniques, as they are optimized to evade detection by microwave-band radars, due to their greatest prevalence, rather than the meter-band radars, which exhibit different scattering characteristics. Use of the meter band can also be considered an electronic counter-countermeasure (ECCM) as radars in this band are less likely to be targetable by jammers and anti-radiation missiles (ARM), as most of them operate at frequencies above 1 GHz. The use of the VHF band also minimizes the atmospheric attenuation effect and makes the construction simpler, more reliable, and cost-effective.
- Ability to perform multiple functions such as long-range preliminary target detection, target designation for air defense systems, defense against ballistic and hypersonic missiles, airspace control, or supporting own forces.
- Antenna that can either rotate to provide a 360° azimuth coverage, or be directed at a 90° sector to be scanned electronically (AESA).
- Multiple modes of operation with configurable parameters to fit the mission profile.
- Instrumented range of 900 km (560 mi) with altitudes up to 160 km (99 mi) or 600 km (370 mi) with altitudes up to 120 km (75 mi) depending on the operation parameters.
- Ability to detect targets with very low RCS. During the testing, targets with RCS as low as 0.0001 m² were detected.
- High precision of 30 m (98 ft) in range and 0.3° in azimuth. This is comparable to the precision of the microwave radars and achieved through advanced signal processing adaptive to the characteristics of the target.
- Identification friend-or-foe system (Mark XIIA Mode 5 and civilian Mode S) with a long-range interrogator.
- Communication systems for the exchange of information with the systems used in air defense units, air operations command centers, and the group's command.
- Jammer detection, parametrization and radiolocation.
- Redundant power generators and ability to operate off external power sources meeting the requirements of typical industrial electrical connections.
- Portable operator station that can be connected via a fiber-optic cable and moved up to 1 km (0.62 mi) away from the operators' vehicle.
- Short deployment time.

=== Lithuania ===
P-18ML – ground-based long-range VHF surveillance radar P-18ML is offered as the modernized follow-on to its prototype, the analogue P-18. Produced by a private Lithuanian company LiTak-Tak.

Radar features:

- maximum use of COTS components
- stable, fail-soft, modular solid-state transmitter
- built-in test equipment
- no special adjustments required during operation
- largely simplified maintenance
- engineered for minimum cost of ownership

As a result of modernization the radar's detection performance is efficiently improved. Modernized radar features automatic tracking capability as well as data receiving from other radar sensors. Data can be exchanged over a variety of communication channels in approved format. The P-18ML is known to be in use by Ukrainian armed forces.

=== Ukraine ===
Upgraded local version P-18 Malachite is based on KrAZ chassis.

=== Serbia ===
During development of modernization electronic set for P-12M radar it was developed digital data receiver that could be used for both P-12 and P-18 radar modernization by Serbian company Iritel. Today that set is in use by Serbian Air Force and Air Defence for modernized P-12 and P-18 radar. This data receiver enables use of remote control for radar using optical cable at distances from 100 to 500 meters.

=== Russia ===
P-18-2 - A P-18 modernization.

P-18T - An upgraded P-18 on a KamAZ-43118 chassis.

== Operators ==
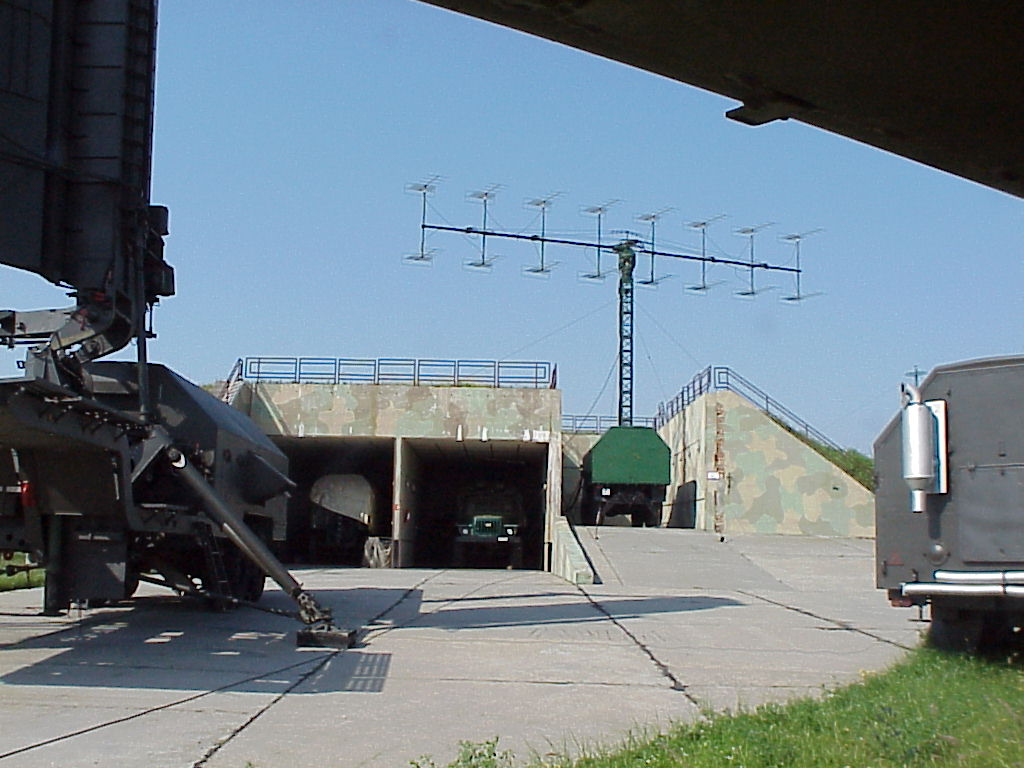
P-18 radar in Hungary

The P-18 was operated by the Soviet Union from 1970 and though it has since become obsolete it was passed down to successor states after the fall of the Soviet Union. The radar continues to serve in many client and third world states who received the P-18 from the Soviet Union by export. Many P-18 have been upgraded and continue to serve in the military and air traffic control role across the world.

- Afghanistan – Photographically confirmed as active at Bagram AB in April 1992. After Jamiat-e Islami mujahideen of Commander Ahmad Shah Massoud overrun the base, the radar probably continued to be operated for some time. Eventually it was destroyed during the civil war in the 1990s.
- Armenia
- Bulgaria
- Cuba
- Czech Republic – Used by first "Flying Rhino" NATO Exercise 1999
- East Germany
- Egypt
- Finland – Known as "Maalinosoitustutka 2", used for anti-aircraft artillery as well as now-obsolete S-125 Neva/Pechora batteries.
- Georgia
- Hungary – Displayed during the Kecskemét 2007 Air and Military Show upgraded by HM Arzenal from 2000.
- India – P-18M – obsolete, being replaced by other radars like Rohini
- Kazakhstan – Upgraded by Aerotechnica MLT
- Myanmar
- Poland – Known as "Laura" locally
- North Korea
- Romania
- Russia
- Serbia
- Soviet Union – Passed to successor states
- Syria
- Turkmenistan
- Ukraine
- Venezuela – P-18M
- Vietnam

== Combat history ==
The P-18 has served in several conflicts in the Middle East, Europe and Asia. One unusual feature of the P-18 is its counter-stealth capability. Since the radar uses metre-length wave VHF, the shaping features and radar absorbent materials used on stealth aircraft are less efficient, allowing VHF based radars to detect targets at a greater range than centimeter or millimeter wave radar which stealth aircraft are optimized against. The presence of a P-18 radar in Yugoslavia during the Kosovo War contributed to the loss of a US F-117 Nighthawk during the conflict.

== See also ==
- List of radars
