= Czech Land Forces =

Land warfare forces of the Czech Republic

- Pozemní síly
- Emblem of the Czech Land Forces
- Founded: 1 January 1993 (33 years, 9 months)
- Country: Czech Republic
- Type: Army
- Role: Land warfare
- Size: 13,000 soldiers
- Part of: Czech Armed Forces
- Headquarters: Olomouc
- Engagements: IFOR; SFOR; Kosovo Force; War in Iraq; War in Afghanistan; EUTM Mali
- Website: Official Website

Commanders
- Commander: Brigadier General Josef Trojánek
- Deputy Commander: Brigadier General Róbert Dziak

Insignia
- National emblem (Note: Národní rozlišovací znak, literally the "National distinguishing emblem", defined by notification No. 387/2010 Coll.)

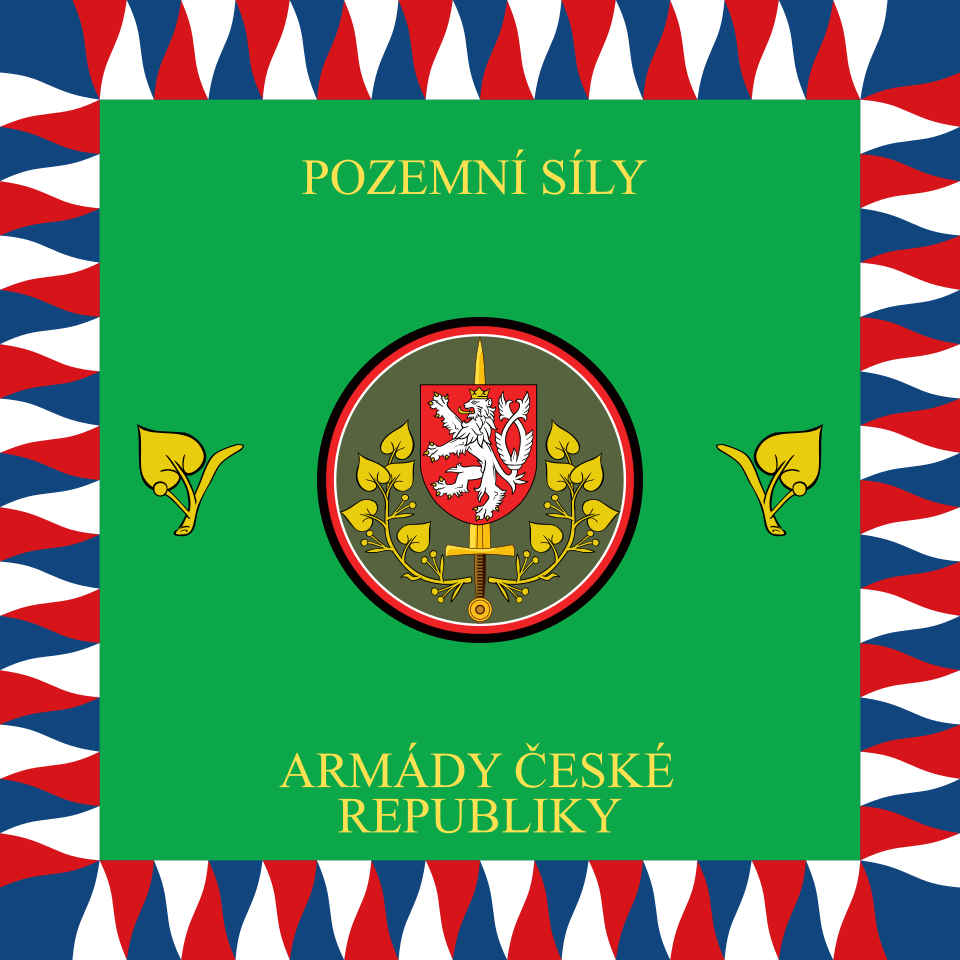
- Flag

The Czech Land Forces (Czech: Pozemní síly) (Note: Pozemní síly Armády České republiky in full, literally the "Land Forces of the Czech Armed Forces") are the land warfare forces of the Czech Republic. The Land Forces consisting of various types of arms and services complemented by air and special operations forces constitute the core of the Czech Armed Forces. Land Forces Command is located in Olomouc.

Peacetime structure comprises two mechanized brigades, an airborne regiment and specialized regiments of artillery, logistics, engineers, CBRN defence, reconnaissance and electronic warfare. Mechanized brigades are equipped with various types of combat vehicles to ensure the execution of different combat operations.

== Tasks ==
In coordination with other services the Czech Land Forces are organized to defend the national territory. In case of crisis or in the event of hostilities they form the core of operation task force and eventually they are complemented by mobilized units. The Land Forces are also designed for fulfilment of commitment in compliance with the Article 5 of the North Atlantic Treaty and tasks on behalf of the state administration authorities.

== History ==
After January 1993, the land forces of the Czechoslovak People's Army split into the Czech Land Forces and the Ground Forces of the Slovak Republic.

During the 1980s the 1st Army (Czechoslovakia) and the 4th Army had both been located in the western parts of Czechoslovakia. Both were disbanded in the early 1990s but their divisions remained. In 1994, the mechanized, motorized and tank divisions were reorganized into a total of seven mechanized brigades.

The 1st Army Corps consisted of the 1st, 2nd, 3rd and 5th Mechanized Brigades, while the 2nd Army Corps consisted of the 6th, 7th and 8th Mechanized Brigades. Another newly formed unit was the 4th Rapid Deployment Brigade in Havlíčkův Brod directly subordinate to the General Staff, which was built as a airborne unit of the rapid reaction forces, even though the Air Force did not have the necessary transport capacities at the time of its establishment.

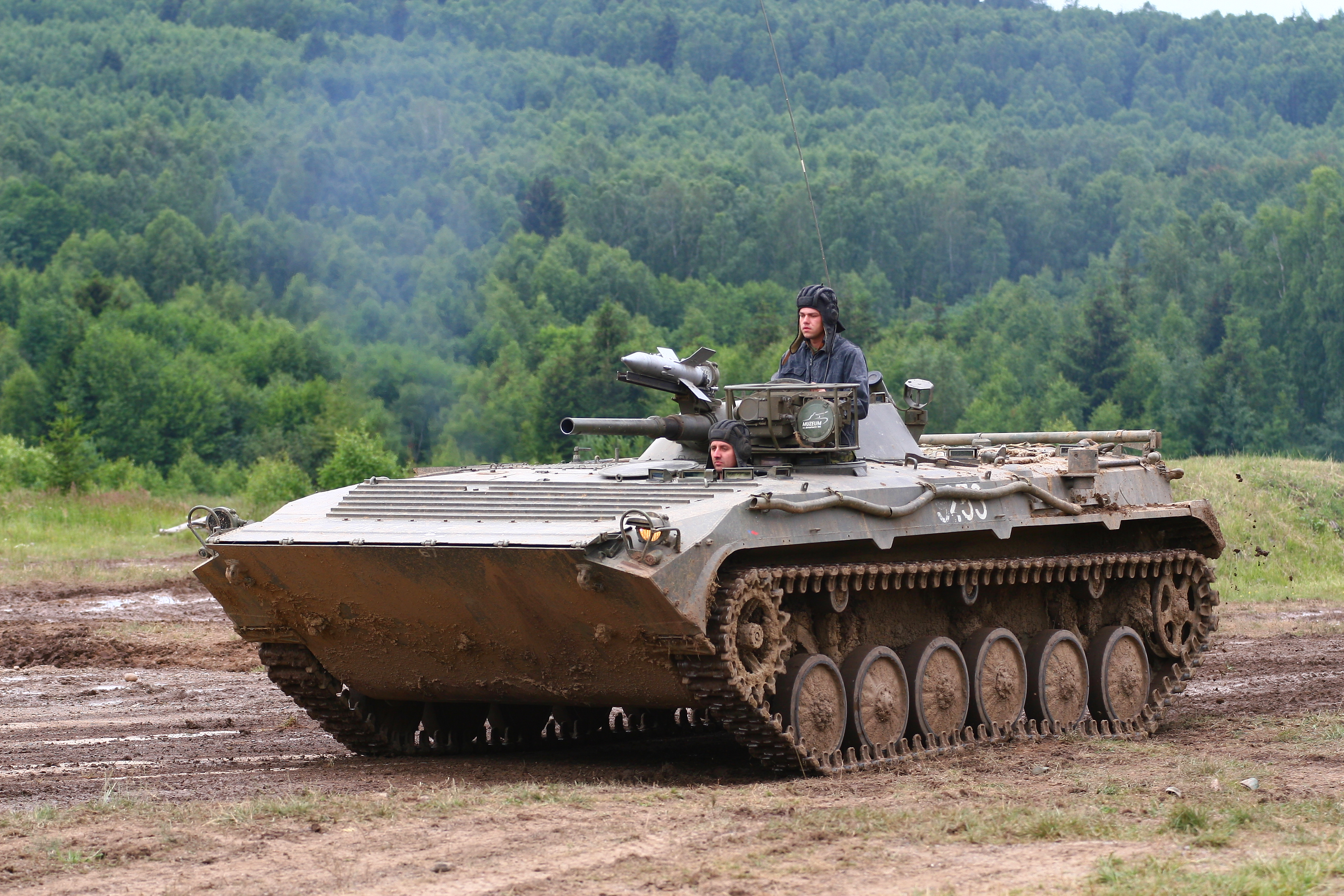
The BPzV Svatava, a combat reconnaissance vehicle based on the BVP-1 (removed from the Czech Army in December 2009).

The brigades were conceived as all-arms, with various troop types. For example, the 7th Mechanized Brigade with headquarters in Kroměříž had as of January 1, 1995 two mechanized battalions (71st and 73rd), each with two mechanized companies (BVP-1), two tank companies (T-54) and other units, two training centers (72nd and 74th), 76th artillery section (18 DANA), 7th anti-tank battalion (BRDM-2/9P133), 7th anti-aircraft section (16 30mm M53/59 Praga, 48 Strela-2M, 1 P-15 radar, and 1 P-19 radar), chemical protection company, reconnaissance battalion, security battalion, communications battalion and medical detachment.

During 1997, the 1st, 3rd, 5th, 6th and 8th Mechanized Brigades were disbanded, and in 2004 the 2nd Mechanized Brigade also ceased to exist. At the end of 2004, the Army of the Czech Republic had two of the original eight brigades, the 4th Rapid Deployment Brigade and the 7th Mechanized Brigade, which were no longer combined arms and consisted of only three battalions. Since 1 January 2005, the ACR has become a fully professional armed force, i.e. without conscript soldiers.

== Equipment ==
Small arms of the Czech Land Forces are mainly supplied by CZUB, e.g. CZ 805 BREN and BREN 2 assault rifles, CZ 75 and CZ P-10 pistols and CZ Scorpion Evo 3 submachine guns. The Czech Armed Forces are equipped with over 3,000 T810, T815 and T815-7 vehicles of various modifications produced by Tatra.

Principal weapons systems of the Czech Land Forces include the Leopard 2A4 tanks gifted from Germany, T-72 tanks (specifically the T-72M4CZ modernized in Czech Republic), BVP-2 infantry fighting vehicles (Czechoslovak-produced version of BMP-2), Pandur II and Iveco LMV wheeled combat vehicles and 152mm vz. 77 DANA self-propelled howitzers.

Air defence and helicopter units are part of the Czech Air Force.

Major armaments and combat equipment as of 1 January 2023:

- 82 main battle tanks
- 385 armoured fighting vehicles
- 167 IFV- and APC-based special vehicles
- 137 light armoured vehicles
- 172 artillery systems (152mm howitzers and 120mm mortars)

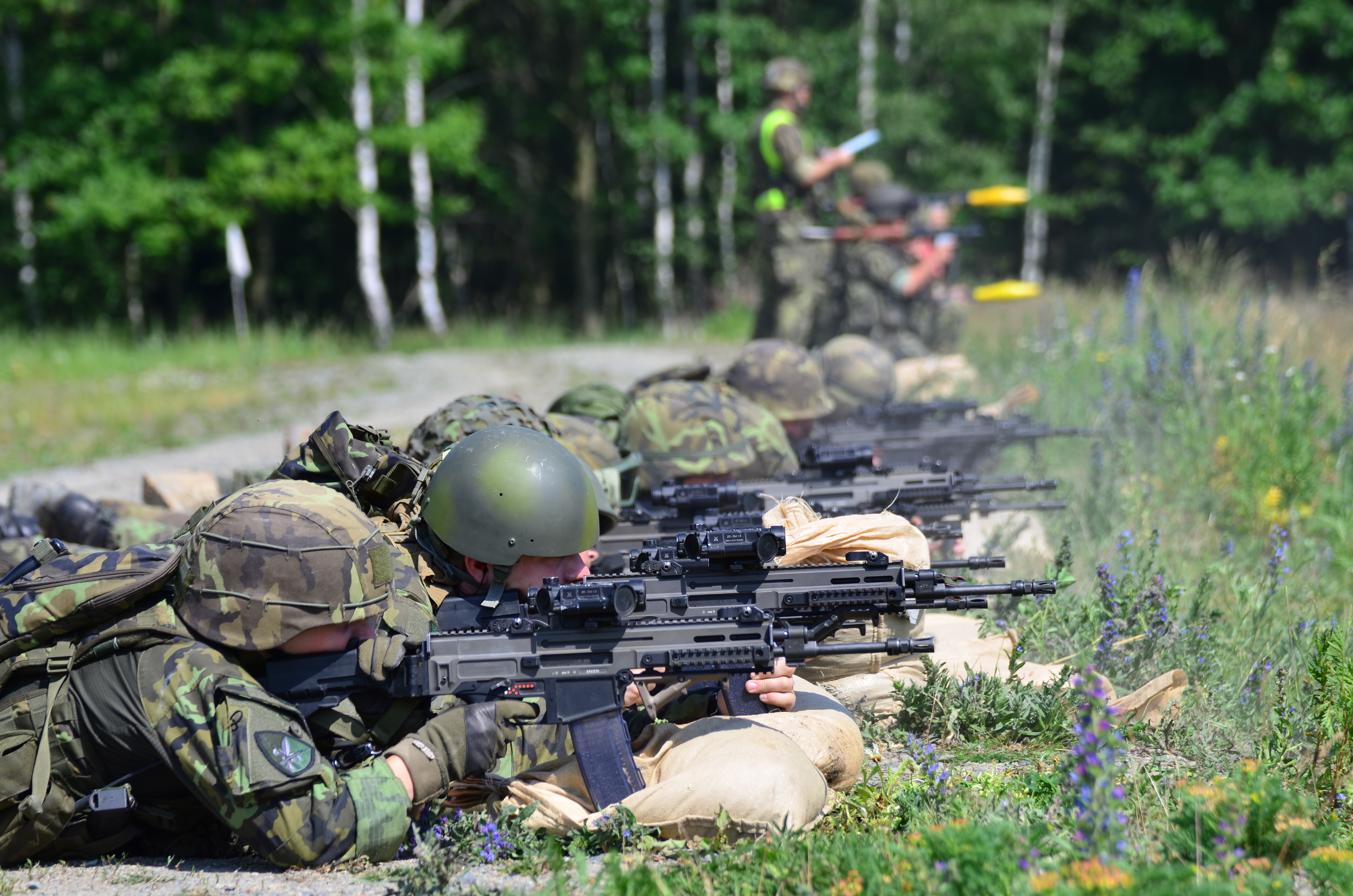
Soldiers armed with CZ 805 and RPG-7

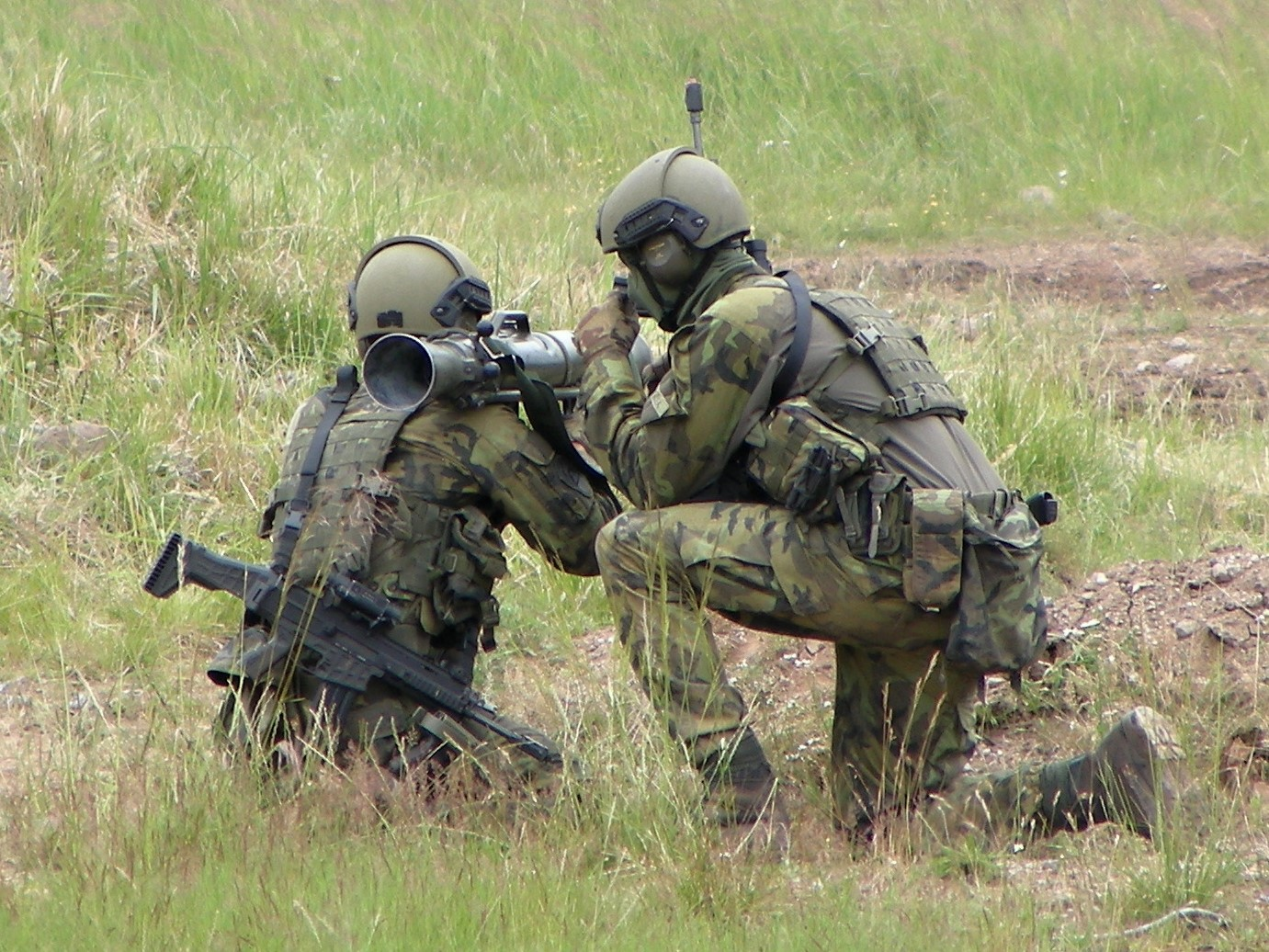
Paratroopers armed with BREN 2 and Carl Gustaf 8.4cm recoilless rifle

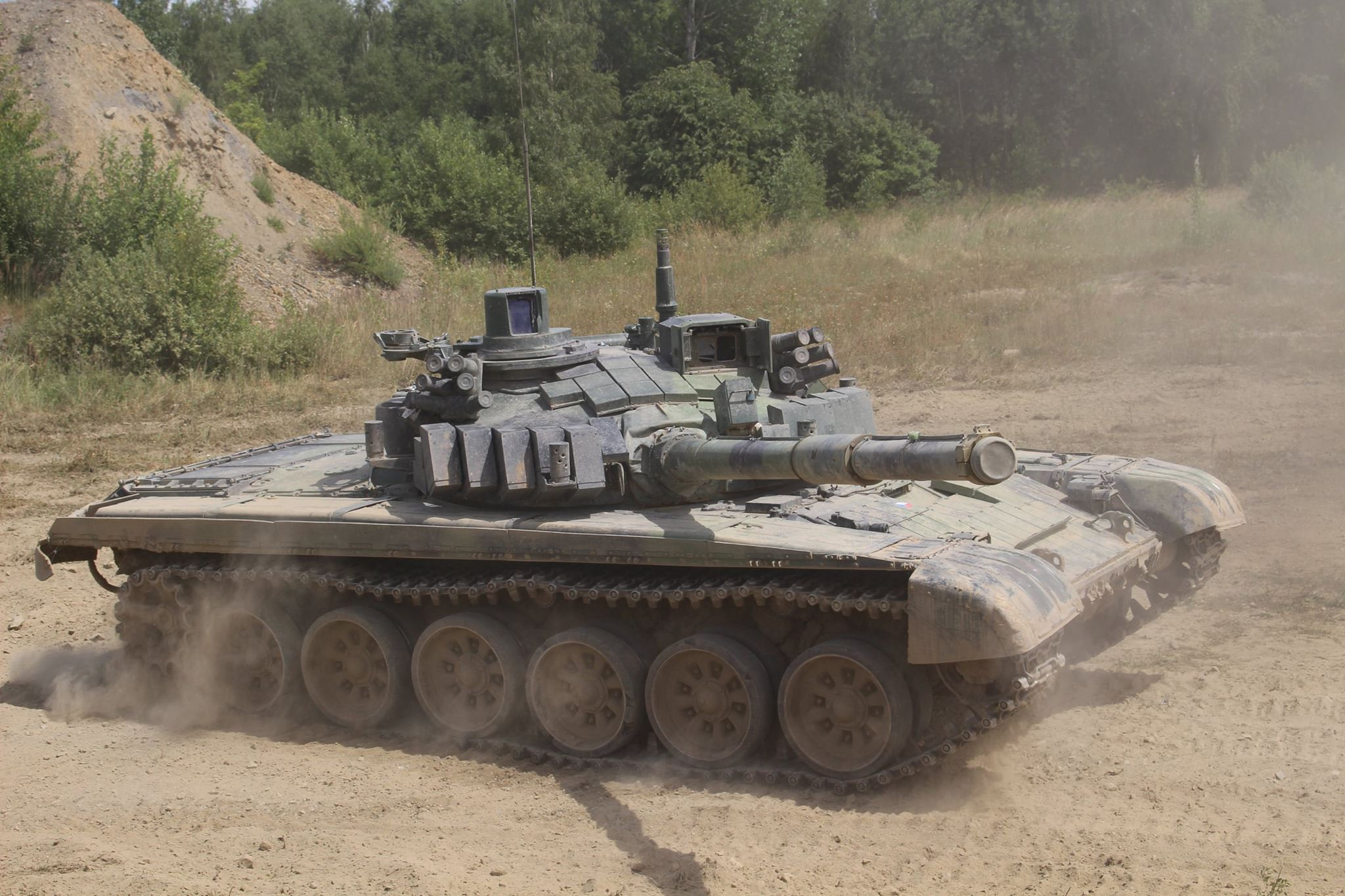
T-72M4 CZ

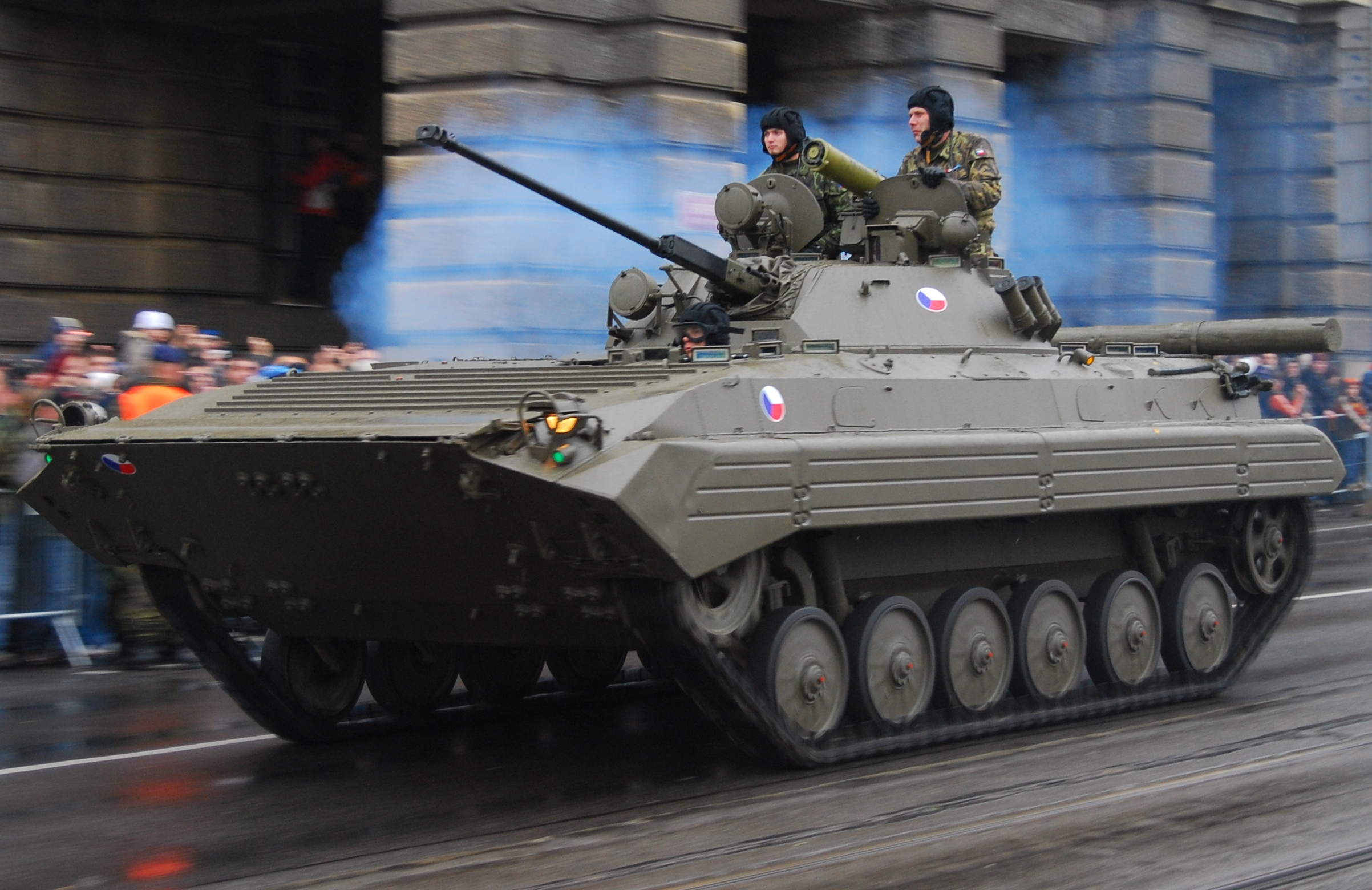
BVP-2

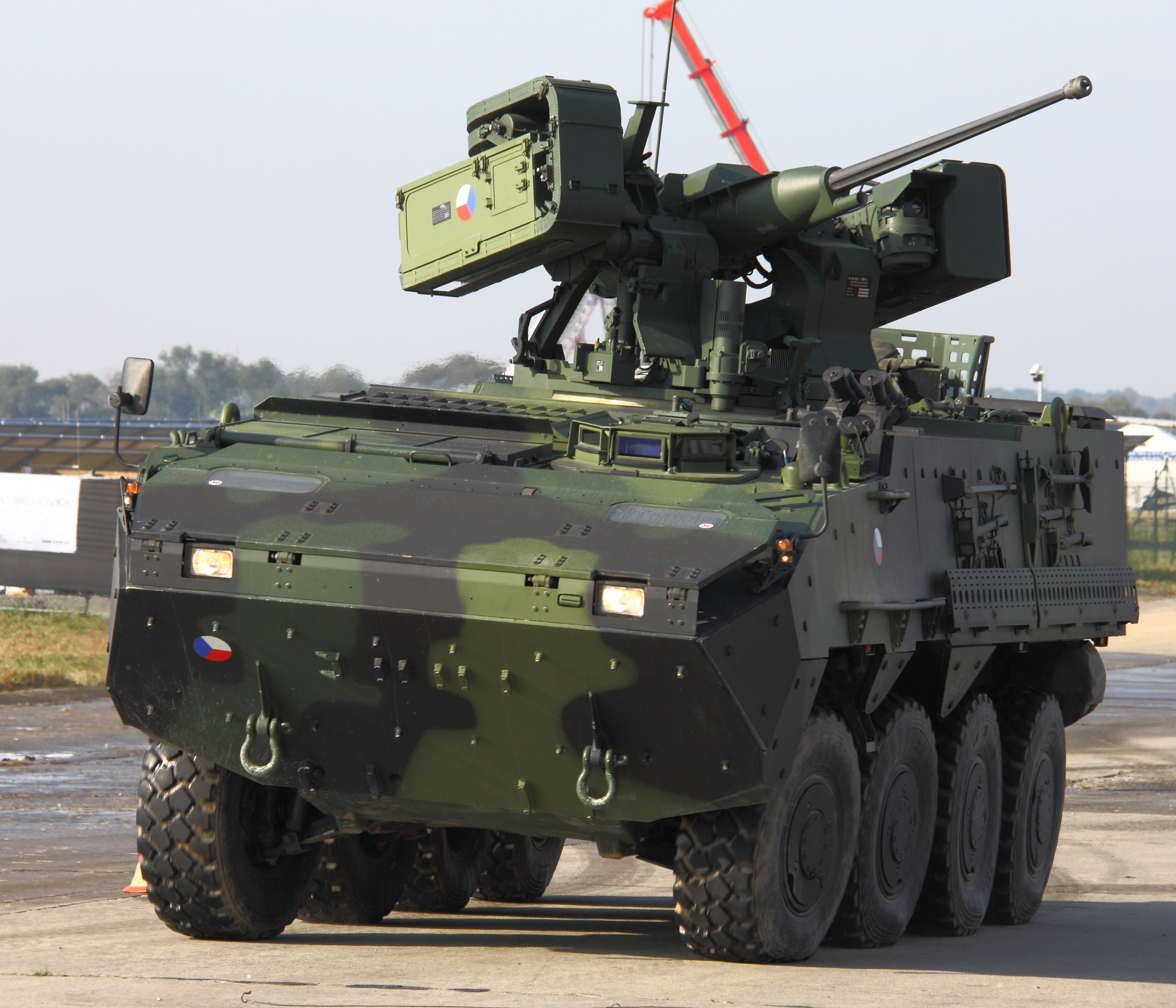
Pandur II

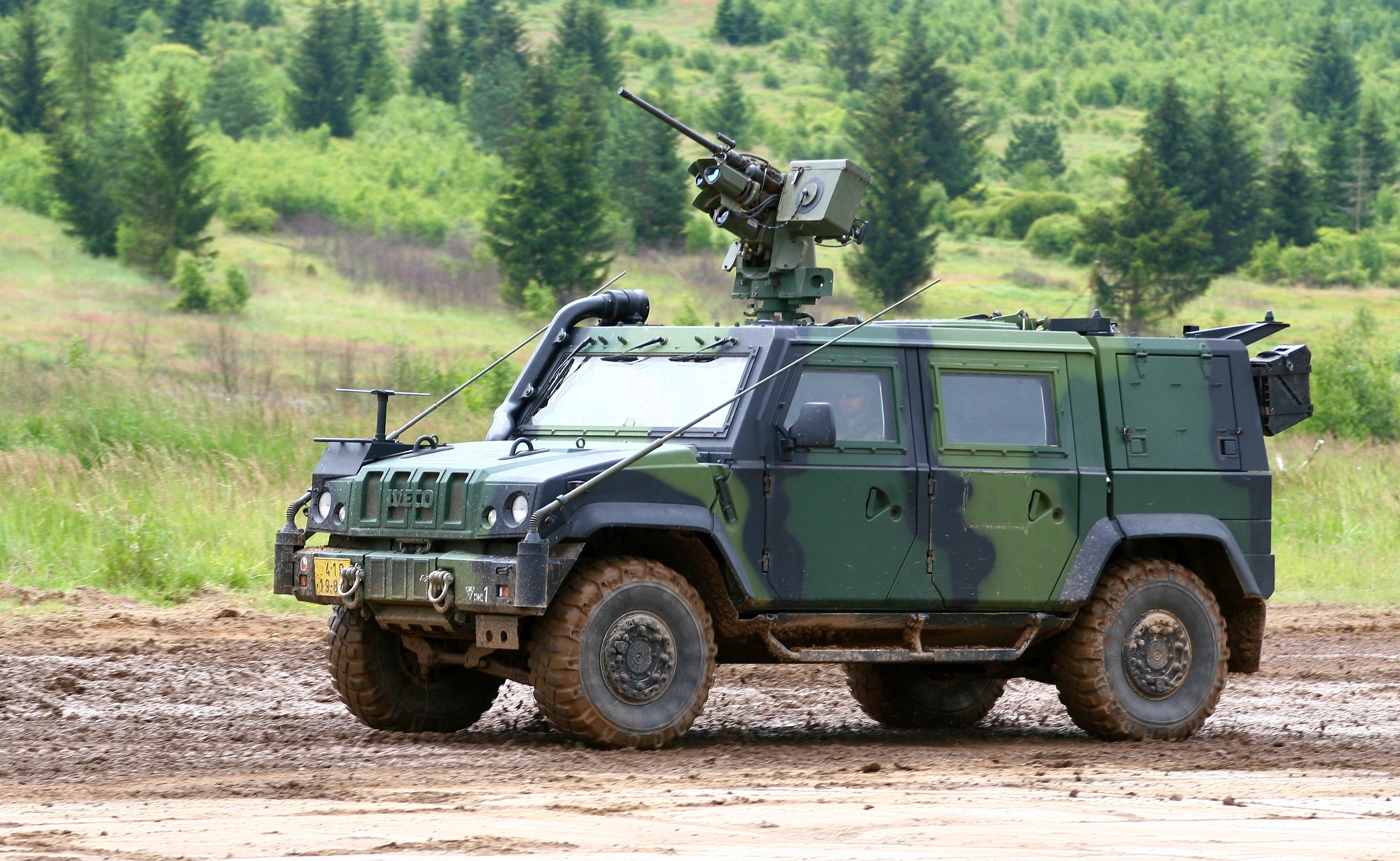
Iveco LMV

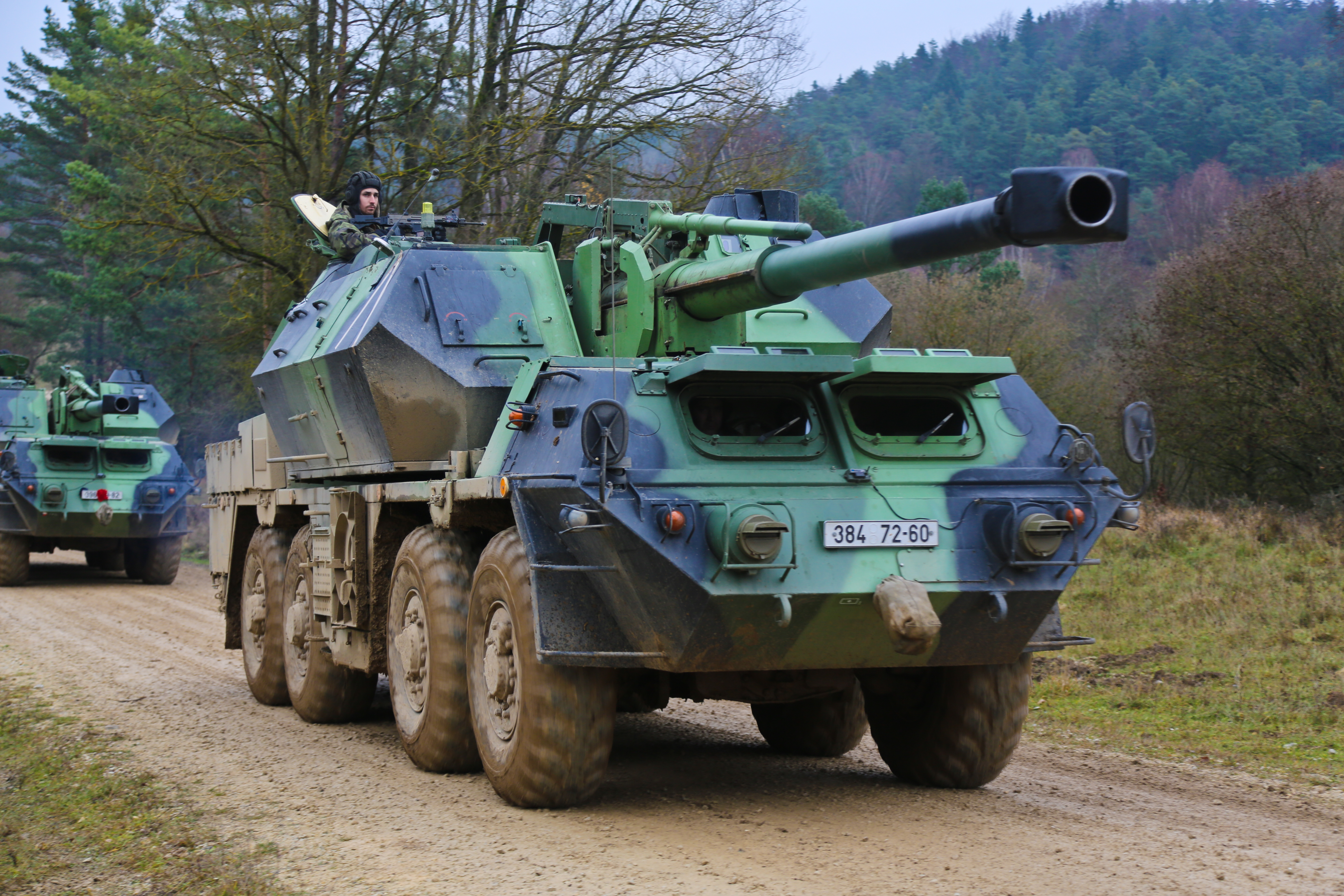
vz. 77 DANA

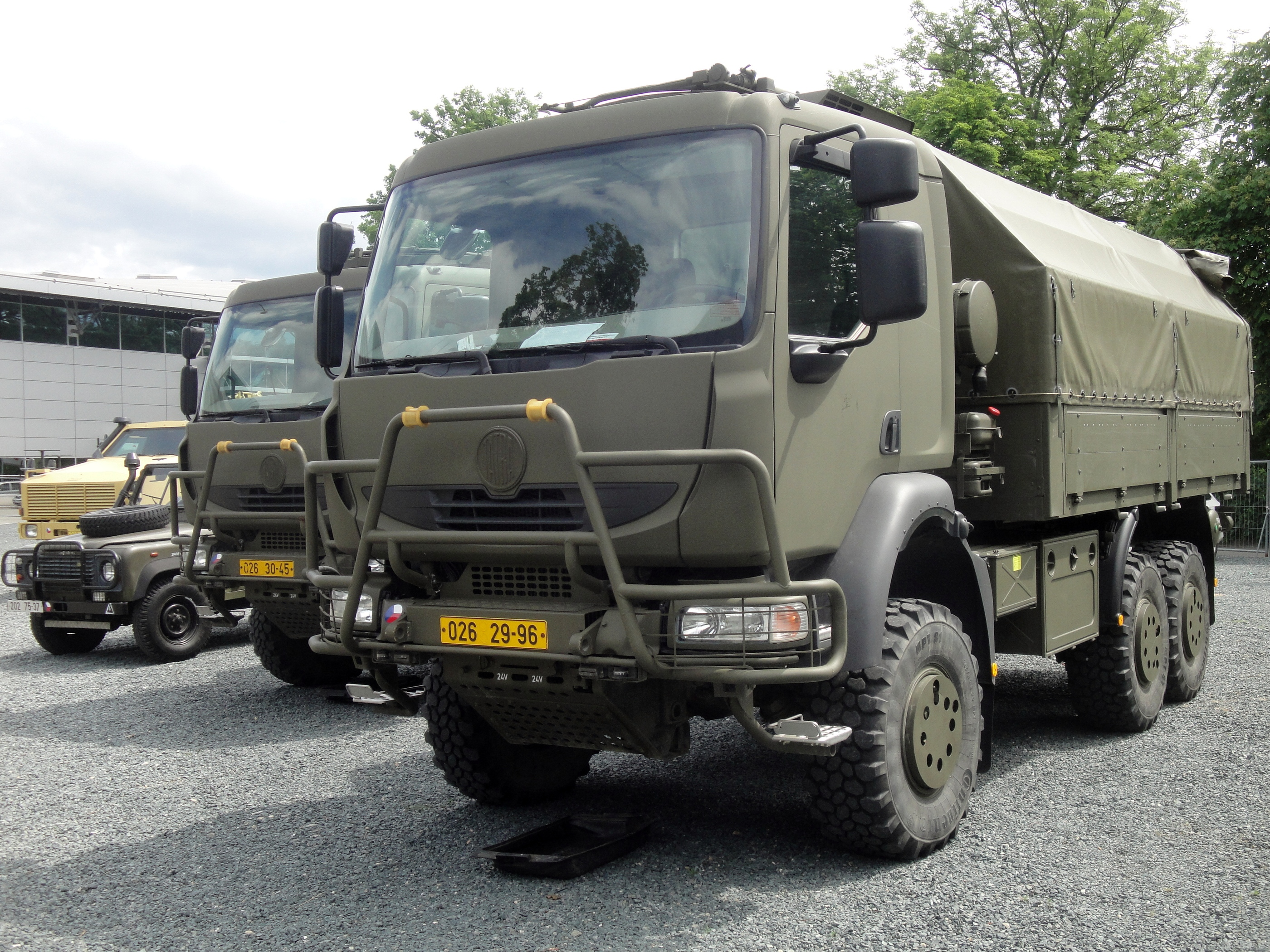
Tatra 810

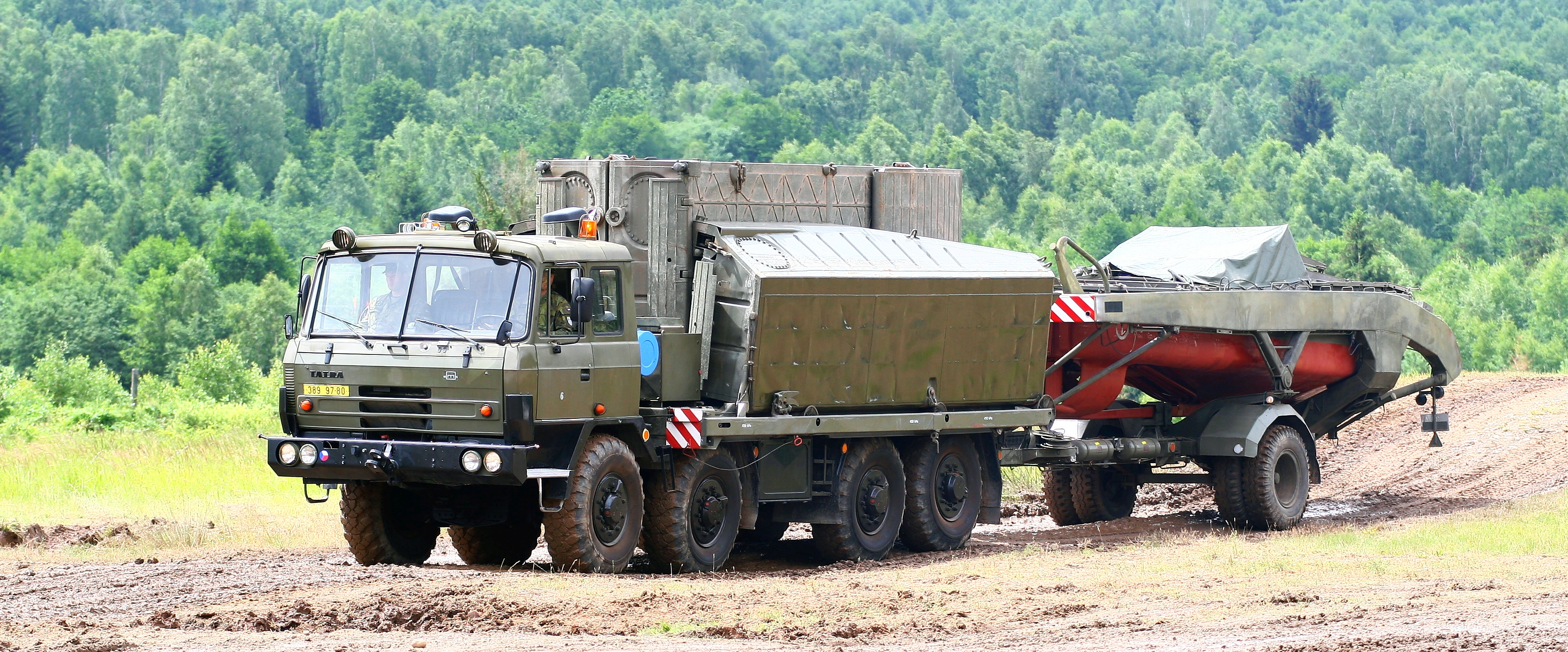
Tatra 815 with pontoon bridge components

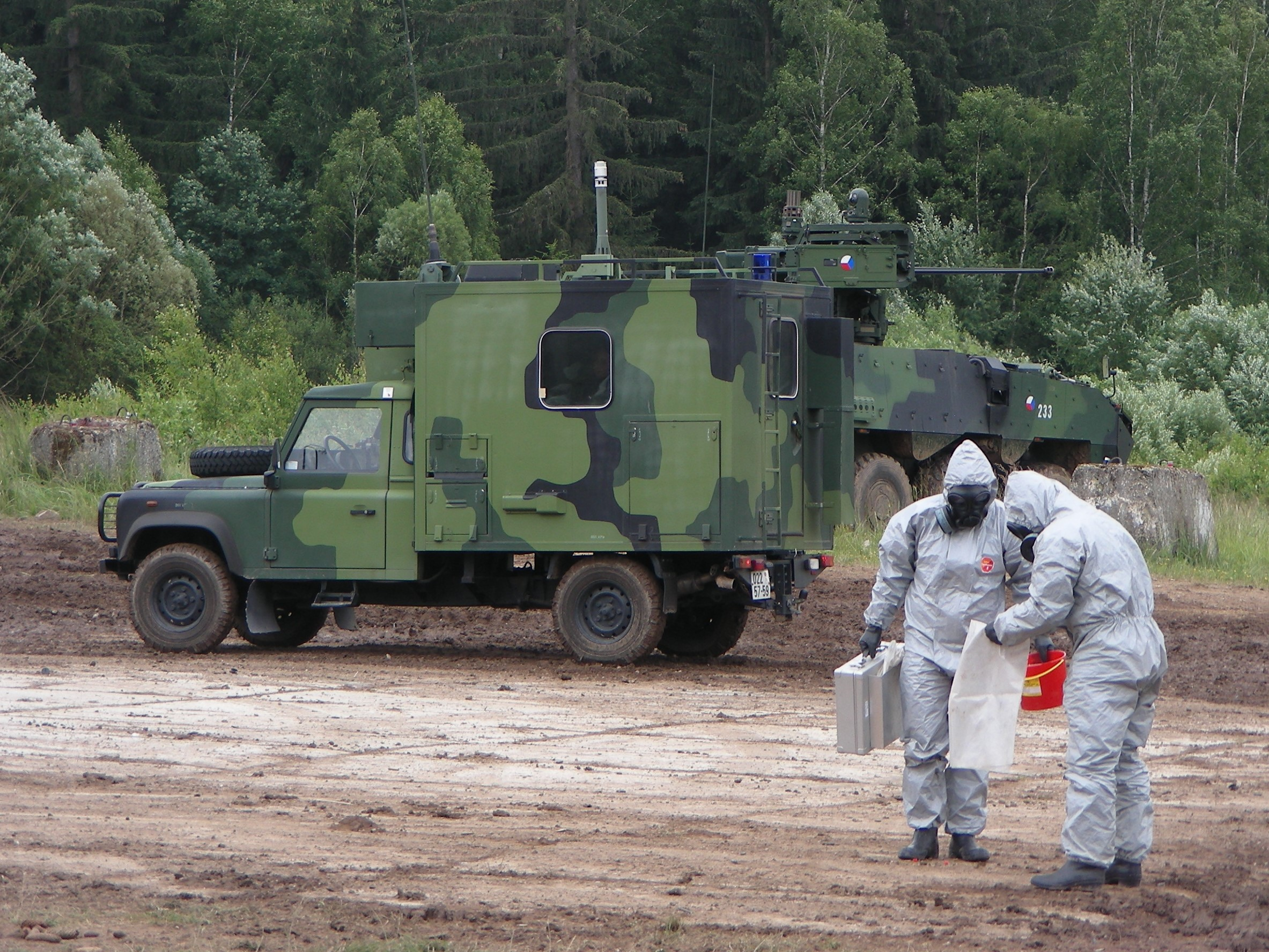
LR 130 RCH

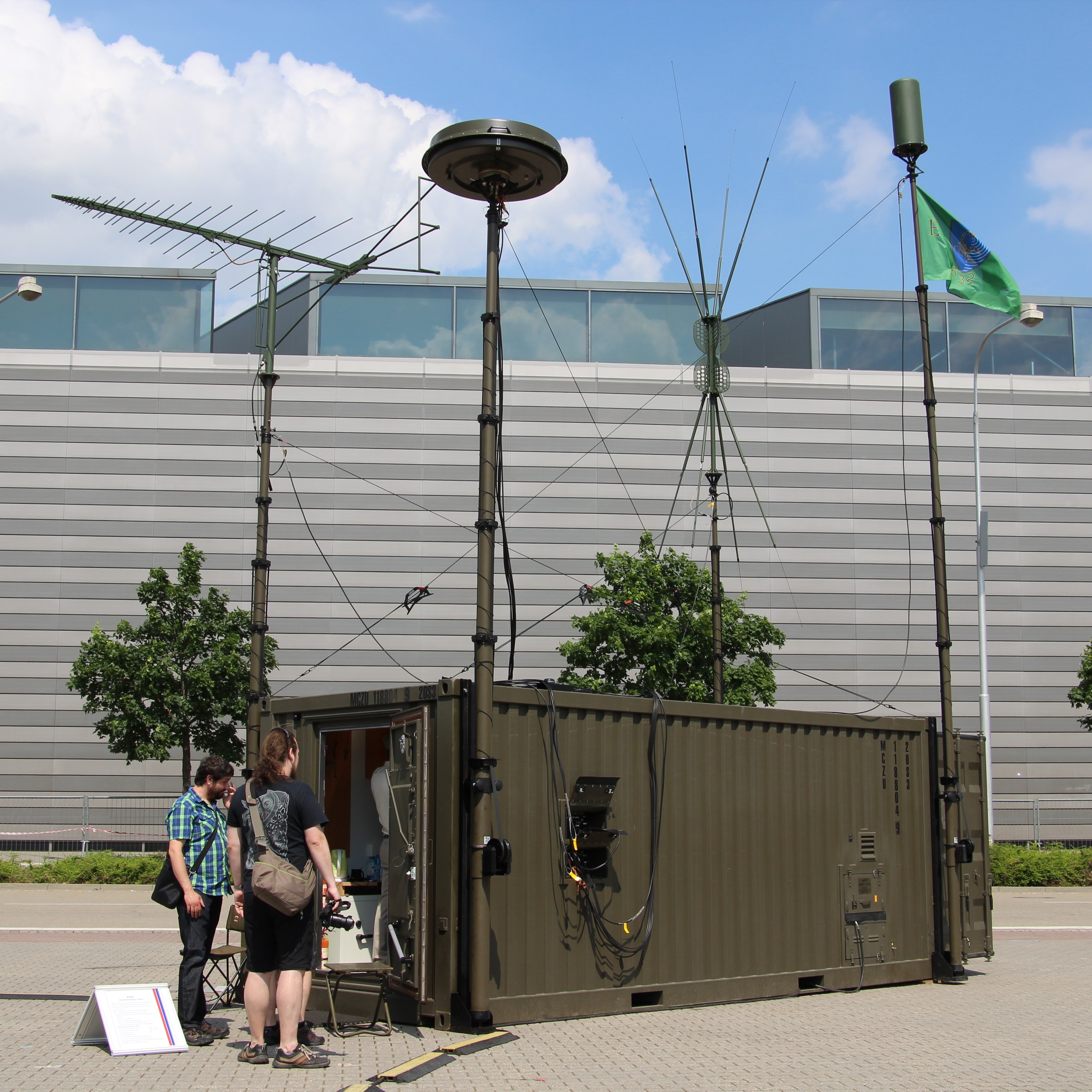
MKEB EW system

== Organization ==
Land Forces Command (Czech: Velitelství pozemních sil) is located in Olomouc. Prague was the location of Land Forces Command from July 2013 to June 2020. Between 2003 and 2013 Land Forces were an integral part of the Joint Forces Command in Olomouc.

The command structure is hierarchical, with brigades and regiments controlling groups of units. Major units are battalion-sized, and minor units are company or platoon-sized units. Airborne Regiment has a unique structure comprising several commandos and centres.

Czech Land Forces are composed of both Regular (full-time) and Active Reserve (part-time) units. Active Reserve platoons, companies and specialized units are affiliated to respective regular units. Moreover, there are 14 Regional Military Headquarters of the Territorial Command, and each one has an Active Reserve infantry company.

Transformation of the 600-strong 43rd Airborne Battalion to 43rd Airborne Regiment with more than 1,200 soldiers scheduled for October 2020 is based upon the 2014 Wales summit declaration regarding the NATO Response Force and Very High Readiness Joint Task Force (VJTF).

=== Combat Forces ===
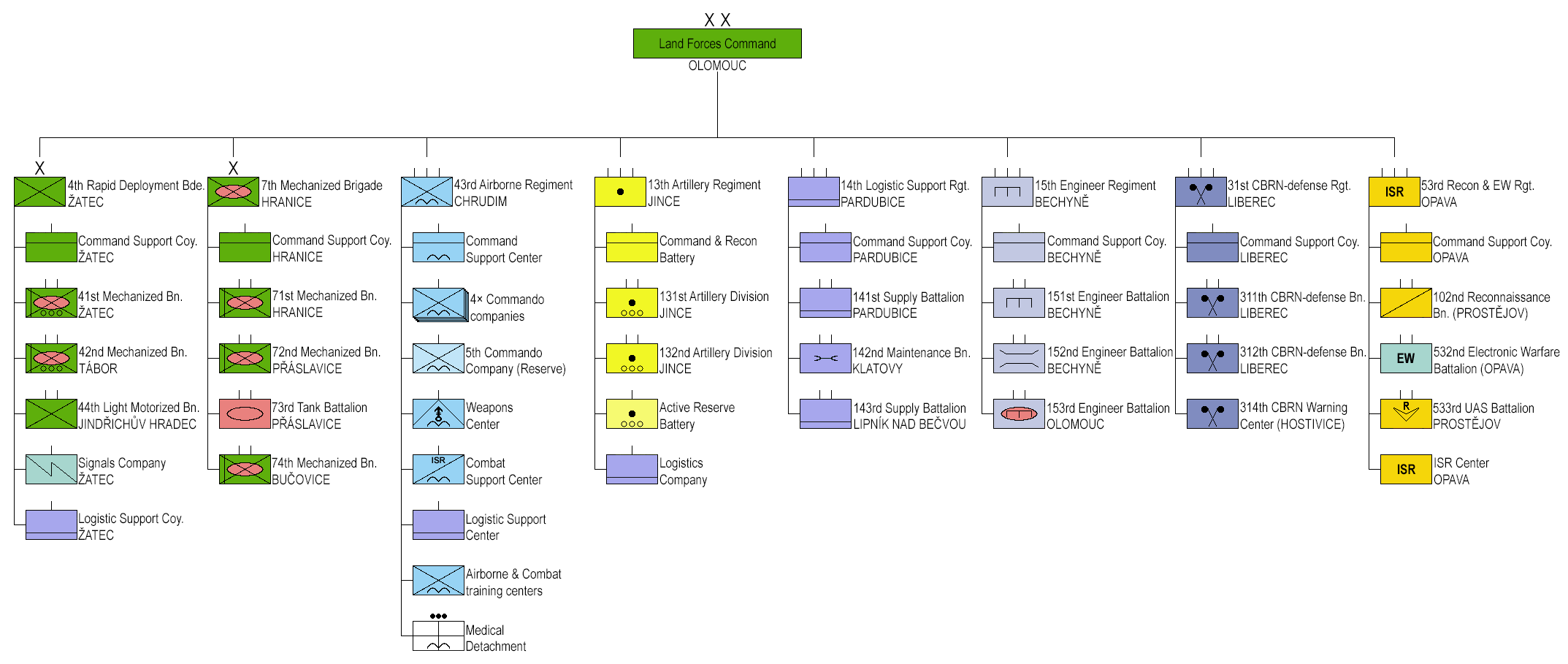
Land Forces Command organization as of April 2026

- 4th Rapid Deployment Brigade, in Žatec
  - Headquarters and Staff
  - 41st Mechanized Battalion, in Žatec (Pandur II)
  - 42nd Mechanized Battalion, in Tábor (Pandur II)
  - 44th Light Motorized Battalion, in Jindřichův Hradec (Iveco LMV)
  - Signals Company
  - Logistic Support Company
- 7th Mechanized Brigade, in Hranice
  - Headquarters and Staff
  - 71st Mechanized Battalion, in Hranice (BVP-2)
  - 72nd Mechanized Battalion, in Přáslavice (BVP-2)
  - 73rd Tank Battalion, in Přáslavice (Leopard 2A4)
  - 74th Mechanized Battalion, in Bučovice (BVP-2 - will be the first unit to receive CV90 infantry fighting vehicles)
- 43rd Airborne Regiment, in Chrudim
  - Headquarters and Staff
  - 1st, 2nd, 3rd, and 4th Commando companies
  - 5th Commando Company (Active Reserve)
  - Weapons Center (81 mm mortars, anti-tank guided missiles)
  - Combat Support Center (Intelligence, Reconnaissance)
  - Command Support Center (Signals)
  - Logistics Support Center
  - Medical Detachment
  - Combat Training Center
  - Airborne Training Center

=== Combat Support Forces ===
- 13th Artillery Regiment, in Jince
  - Headquarters and Staff
    - Garrison Support Element
    - Regimental Aid Post
  - Command and Reconnaissance Battery (ARTHUR Artillery Tracking Radar, Sněžka Surveillance and Reconnaissance System)
  - 131st Artillery Battalion (152mm SpGH DANA)
  - 132nd Artillery Battalion (152mm SpGH DANA)
  - Active Reserve Battery (152mm SpGH DANA)
  - Logistics Company
- 15th Engineer Regiment, in Bechyně
  - Headquarters and Staff
    - EOD Technical and Information Support Center
    - Support Platoon
    - Garrison Support Element
  - 151st Engineer Battalion, in Bechyně (supports the 4th Rapid Deployment Brigade)
  - 152nd Engineer Battalion, in Bechyně (General support and river crossing)
  - 153rd Engineer Battalion, in Olomouc (supports the 7th Mechanized Brigade)
- 31st Radiological, Chemical and Biological Protection Regiment, in Liberec
  - Headquarters and Staff
    - Support Platoon
  - 311th Radiological, Chemical and Biological Protection Battalion, in Liberec
  - 312th Radiological, Chemical and Biological Protection Battalion, in Liberec
  - 314th Weapons of Mass Destruction Warning Center, in Hostivice
- 53rd Reconnaissance and Electronic Warfare Regiment, in Opava
  - Headquarters and Staff
    - Signal Company
    - Support Platoon
    - Garrison Support Element
    - Regimental Aid Post
  - 102nd Reconnaissance Battalion, in Prostějov
  - 532nd Electronic Warfare Battalion, in Opava
  - 533rd Unmanned Aircraft Systems Battalion, in Prostějov
  - ISR (Intelligence Surveillance and Reconnaissance) Center, in Opava

=== Combat Service Support Forces ===
- 14th Logistic Support Regiment, in Pardubice
  - Headquarters and Staff
  - Command Support Company
  - 141st Supply Battalion, in Pardubice
  - 142nd Maintenance Battalion, in Klatovy
  - 143rd Supply Battalion, in Lipník nad Bečvou

MOD's Logistics Agency has been building the Host Nation Support (HNS) Battalion in Rakovník since October 2018. HNS Battalion is not part of the Land Forces as it reports directly to the Logistics Agency.

== Ranks ==
=== Commissioned officer ranks ===
The rank insignia of commissioned officers.

| NATO code | OF-10 | OF-9 | OF-8 | OF-7 | OF-6 | OF-5 | OF-4 | OF-3 | OF-2 | OF-1 |
|---|---|---|---|---|---|---|---|---|---|---|---|
| Czech Land Forces |
| Czech Land Forces | | Armádní generál | Generálporučík | Generálmajor | Brigádní generál | Plukovník | Podplukovník | Major | Kapitán | Nadporučík | Poručík |

=== Other ranks ===
The rank insignia of non-commissioned officers and enlisted personnel.

| NATO code | OR-9 | OR-8 | OR-7 | OR-6 | OR-5 | OR-4 | OR-3 | OR-2 | OR-1 |
|---|---|---|---|---|---|---|---|---|---|---|
| Czech Land Forces |
| Czech Land Forces | Štábní praporčík | Nadpraporčík | Praporčík | Nadrotmistr | Rotmistr | Rotný | Četař | Desátník | Svobodník | Vojín |
