= Kasta 2E =

Russian radar system

Kasta 2E1
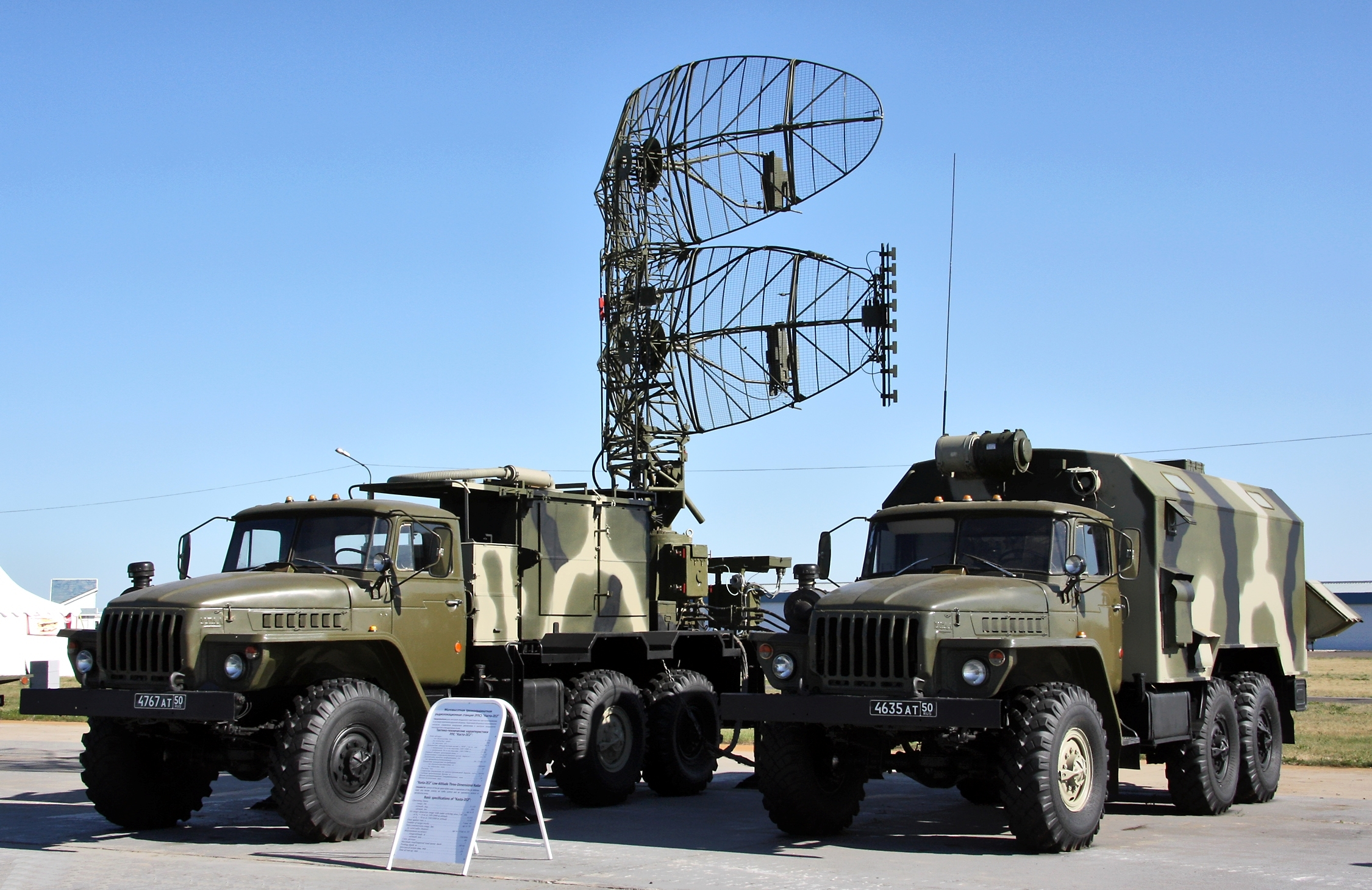
- Kasta 2E1 Acquisition Radar
- Country of origin: Soviet Union
- Manufacturer: Almaz-Antey
- Designer: VNIIRT
- Introduced: 1989
- Type: Target acquisition
- Frequency: 830-882 MHz (UHF)
- Beamwidth: 8° (horizontal)
- RPM: 6-12RPM
- Range: 150 km (93 mi)
- Altitude: 6 km (3.7 mi)
- Azimuth: 360º
- Precision: 450 m (1,480 ft), 100' (1.7°)
- Power: 1kW (avg.) 16kW (max)
- Other names: Flat Face-E, 51U6 (GRAU index), Kasta 2-1, Casta 2E1, Cyrillic: 51У6
- Related

Kasta 2E2
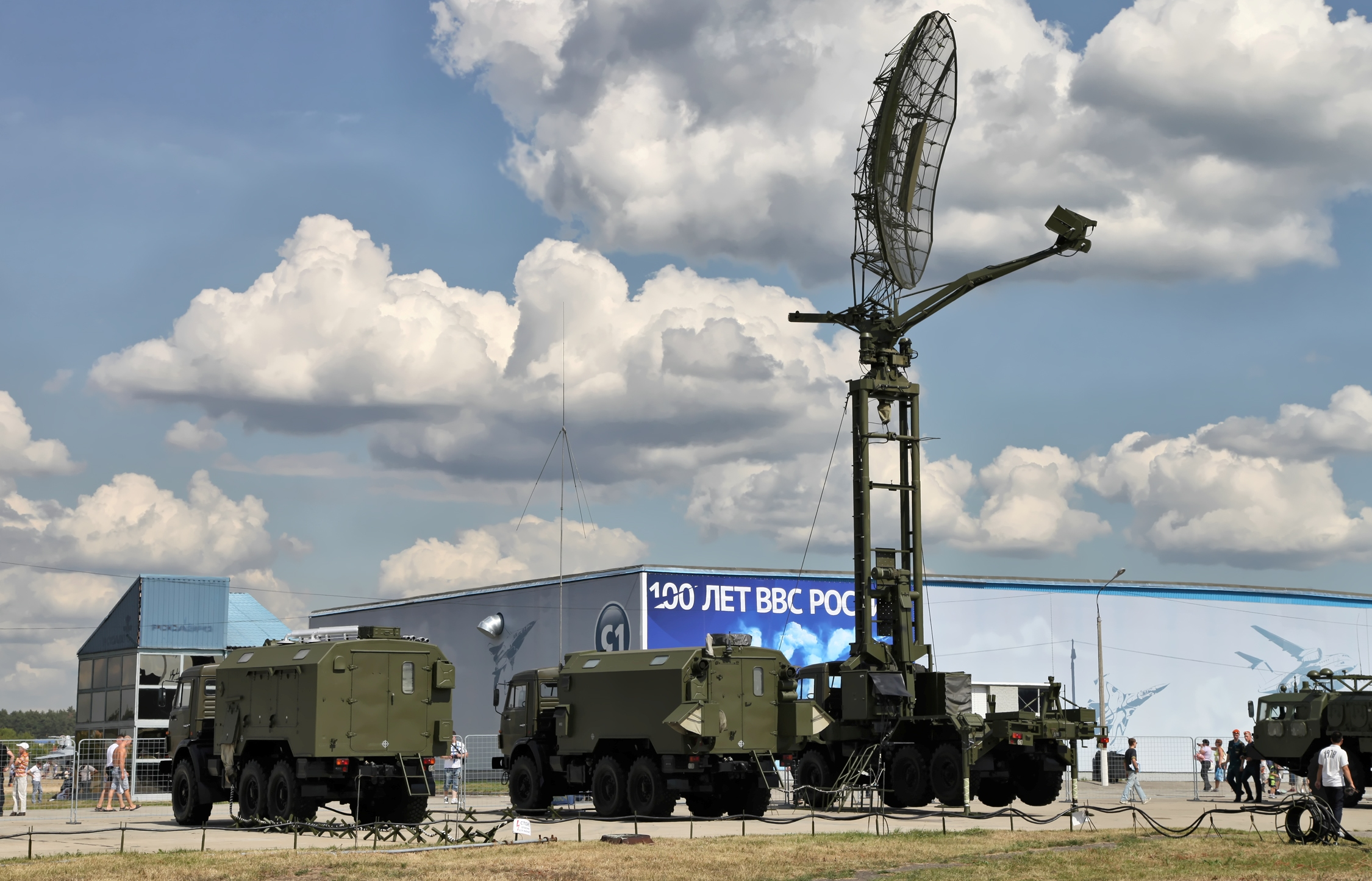
- Kasta 2E2 FCR
- Country of origin: Russia
- Manufacturer: Almaz-Antey
- Designer: VNIIRT
- Introduced: Early 2000s
- Type: FCR
- Frequency: UHF
- Beamwidth: 5.5° (horizontal)
- RPM: 6-12RPM
- Range: 150 km (93 mi)
- Altitude: 6 km (3.7 mi)
- Azimuth: 360º
- Precision: 100 m (330 ft), 40' (0.7°)
- Power: 23kW (max)
- Other names: Flat Face-E, 39N6 (GRAU index), Kasta 2-2, Casta 2E2, Cyrillic: 39Н6
- Related

Air defense specialists of the 150th MRD erect the Kasta 2E1

The Kasta 2E radar group (NATO reporting name "Flat Face-E") is a Russian radar system, consisting of the Kasta 2E1, Kasta 2E2 and their supporting equipment. The Kasta system is designed to succeed the older Flat Face models, such as the P-15 and the P-19. Despite looking visually similar (similar radar reflectors) to the previous listed, Kasta has significant differences to the P-15 and P-19.

== Development ==
The Kasta 2E was developed originally by the Soviet Union. Its primary objective is to overcome deficiencies or to satisfy the demand in low-level surveillance. Both radar types can be triggered with either equal or opposed phases. Both antenna types can optionally be mounted on a standard 50 meter pylon. This arrangement causes a displacement of the radar horizon which in turn increases the detection altitude up to 6 km at a distance of 150 km.

== Systems ==
The Kasta 2E1 (51U6) system uses two antennas and consists of two vehicles:

- one truck carries the antenna and its peripheral equipment
- another truck operates as command post vehicle and on a trailer unit, the external power supply is installed

The Kasta 2E2 (39N6E) system uses one antenna and consists of three vehicles:

- one truck carries the antenna and its peripheral equipment
- another truck operates as command post vehicle
- a diesel-electric power plant is mounted another truck and two single-axle trailers carry auxiliary equipment

	Kasta 2E1	Kasta 2E2
Target detection (height 100 m) with Antenna 5.4 / 14 m	32 km	41 km
Target detection (height 100 m) with Antenna 50 m	58 km	55 km
Accuracy distance	540 m	100 m
Azimuth	100'	40'
Height	n.a.	900 m
Velocity	n.a.	2 m/s
Data processing cap.	n.a.	200 Plots
Target tracking	n.a.	50 Tracks
Max. Range of radio connection	n.a.	50 km
Moving target indication (MTI)	53 DB	54 DB
Mean time between failure (MTBF)	300 h	700 h
Setup time	20 min	20 min
Power up	3.3 min	3.3 min
Teardown	20 min	20 min
Power consumption (max)	16 kW	23 kW
Operating crew	2	2
Transport units	2	3
