= VNIIRT =

Russian manufacturer of air surveillance radars

- Type: Joint-stock company
- Founded: 1921
- Headquarters: Moscow, Russia
- Parent: Almaz-Antey
- Website: www.vniirt.ru

VNIIRT - All-Russian Scientific Research Institute of Radio Engineering (Russian: Всероссийский НИИ Радиотехники) is a Russian manufacturer of air surveillance radars. It is part of the Almaz-Antey holding.

VNIIRT is the primary Russian designer of ground-based air surveillance radars. It performs scientific research and experimental design work on radars for both the strategic air defense forces and for the ground forces. It has devoted much attention to metric-band (VHF) radars, which have inherent counter-stealth capabilities and are relatively unaffected by meteorological obscuration. VNIIRT's products also have application to civil air traffic control.

- 1955; P-15 1RL13 Tropa FLAT FACE A, UHF (B/C-band),
- 1970; ST-68 (19Zh6) TIN SHIELD, E-band, Fun fact: First Soviet radar with digital coherent signal processing,
- 1974; P-19 1RL134 Danube FLAT FACE B, UHF (B/C-band)

== VNIIRT designed air surveillance radars ==
Radar	NATO reporting name	Radio spectrum (NATO)	Developed	Notes
P-15 Tropa	FLAT FACE A	UHF	1955	
ST-68	TIN SHIELD	E-band	1970	First Soviet radar with digital coherent signal processing
P-19 Danube	FLAT FACE B	UHF	1974	

== Management and leading specialists ==
=== Directors ===
- 1944-1950 — Kurakin Kuzma Lavrentievich
- 1950-1964 — Zemnorey Andrey Petrovich
- 1964-1980 — Chudakov Pavel Mikhailovich

=== Leading Specialists ===
- Belov Nikolai Ivanovich — worked in various scientific and managerial positions from 1938 to 1946. He was twice awarded the Stalin Prize for his work at the Institute (1943, 1946).
- Kobzarev Yuri Borisovich — worked in various scientific and managerial positions from 1949 to 1968. For his work at the institute he was awarded two Orders of Lenin (1952, 1965).
