= Flat Face =

Flat Face is the NATO reporting name for the following Soviet air defense radars:

- P-15 radar, NATO reporting name "Flat Face A"
- P-19 radar, NATO reporting name "Flat Face B"
