= List of former equipment of the Georgian Armed Forces =

This list includes equipment that was formally used by the Defence Forces of Georgia. Some of the listed equipment could still be in reserve or used for ceremonial purposes.

== Small arms ==
Weapon	Photo	Origin	Notes
Pistols
Makarov PM		Soviet Union	Many inherited from Soviet Union
Stechkin APS		Soviet Union	AO-44 version also used.
TT-33		Soviet Union	
PSM		Soviet Union	
CZ 82		Czechoslovakia	
Submachine guns
MP 40		Nazi Germany	Was used by Georgian Army units during Georgian civil war, probably obtained from Soviet reserve arm stocks.
Rifles
Mosin–Nagant		Russian Empire; Russian Republic / Soviet Union	Used as ceremonial weapon as of now, sniper versions were used by Army as late as 2005.
SVT-40		Soviet Union	
SKS		Soviet Union	Still in use for ceremonial purposes.
AK-47; AKS-47		Soviet Union	Inherited from Soviet Union, out of service by now.
Machine guns
DP-28		Soviet Union	
RPD machine gun		Soviet Union	Inherited from Soviet Union, was seen used during Georgian Civil War.
SG-43 Goryunov		Soviet Union	Mainly used on vehicles.
Sniper rifles
Heckler & Koch MSG90		West Germany	Was used by Special Operation Forces.
Grenades and explosives
RKG-3		Soviet Union	Anti-tank grenade
RPG-43		Soviet Union	Anti-tank grenade

== Heavy weapons ==
Weapon	Photo	Origin	Type	Notes
Artillery and mortars
152 mm howitzer M1943 (D-1)		Soviet Union	Howitzer	Some were still in service in 2000, As of 2017 they are being retired.
122 mm howitzer M1938 (M-30)		Soviet Union	Howitzer	Some still could be in reserve.
152 mm howitzer-gun M1937 (ML-20)		Soviet Union	Howitzer	
ZiS-3		Soviet Union	Field gun	At least 4 guns are being still used as decoration on military bases.
RM-38		Soviet Union	Infantry mortar	
82-BM-37		Soviet Union	Infantry mortar	
120-PM-43 mortar		Soviet Union	Mortar (weapon)	14 soviet mortar were delivered from Bulgaria, out of service by now.
Anti-aircraft artillery
37 mm automatic air defense gun M1939		Soviet Union	Anti-aircraft cannon	
Oerlikon 20 mm cannon		Switzerland	Anti-aircraft cannon	Used on navy ships and vessels.
100 mm air defense gun KS-19		Soviet Union	Anti-aircraft cannon	
Anit-tank weapons
9M14 Malyutka		Soviet Union	Anti-tank missile	Some mounted on BMP-1 vehicles.

== Vehicles ==
Weapon	Photo	Origin	Type	Notes
T-54		Soviet Union	Main battle tank	some were inherited from Soviet Union and saw service during 90s 1 lost in tbilisi war another lost in abkhasia war. ..
T-34		Soviet Union	Medium tank	200, At the start of the Georgian Civil War at least one tank which was used as monument, was restored by Georgian forces. Although the main gun was deactivated the Georgian army used T-34 to scare off rebels in South Ossetia, tanks were retired shortly after war ended, at least 3 can be seen in restored condition all over Georgia, Meanwhile, some are being still used as targets at firing ranges.
M4 Sherman		United States	Medium tank	At least 3 M4s were present in Tbilisi as monuments, it is not clear if they were reactivated and used in Georgian Civil War but at least one Sherman was used as target at tank firing range, later on they were scrapped around 35 units.
BTR-60		Soviet Union	Armoured personnel carrier	Some inherited from Soviet Union and saw action during war in Abkhazia and south ossetia only 1 was in service by 2008..

== Air-defence systems ==
Weapon	Photo	Origin	Type	Notes
S-75 Dvina		Soviet Union	Strategic surface-to-air missile system	Saw usage during Georgian Civil War, system was retired and scrapped in 2007.
S-125 Neva/Pechora		Soviet Union; Ukraine	Strategic surface-to-air missile system	Inherited from Soviet Union, some upgraded by Ukraine, mostly phased out in 2007.
2K11 Krug		Soviet Union	Transportable surface-to-air missile system	
Radar systems
P-12 radar		Soviet Union	Early warning	
P-15 radar		Soviet Union	Surveillance/Target acquisition	
P-19 radar		Soviet Union	Surveillance/Target acquisition	
PRV-17		Soviet Union	Radar altimeter	

== Aircraft ==
Weapon	Photo	Origin	Notes
Combat aircraft
Mikoyan-Gurevich MiG-21		Soviet Union; Georgia	At least 12 MiG-21UM were retained by Tbilaviamsheni factory and reportedly transferred to Georgian Air Force, One is still in operational condition as of 2016.
Sukhoi Su-17		Soviet Union	Several Su-17M4 were inherited from Soviet Union, they were never restored to operational condition, some inoperable aircraft were in service as of 2005.
Transport aircraft
Antonov An-12		Soviet Union	
Antonov An-26		Soviet Union	
Antonov An-72		Soviet Union	
