= 7th Mechanised Brigade =

7th Mechanised Brigade may refer to:

- 7th Mechanized Brigade (Czech Republic)
- 7th Mechanized Infantry Brigade (Greece)
- South Skåne Brigade, Sweden
- 7th Light Mechanised Brigade, United Kingdom

== See also ==
- 7th Brigade (disambiguation)
