= T-72M4CZ =

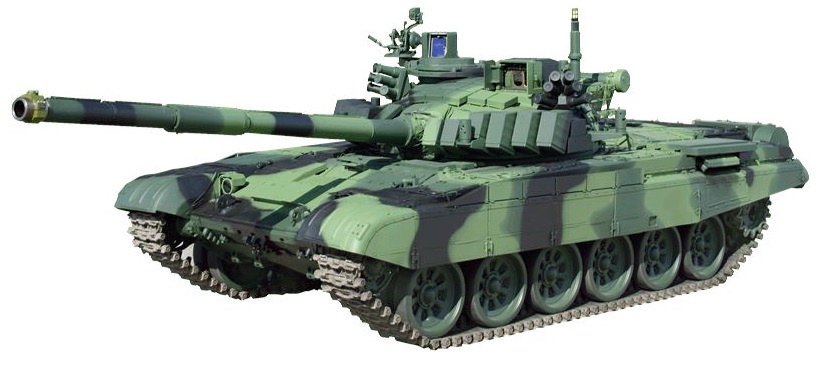
- T-72M4 CZ
- Type: Main battle tank
- Place of origin: Czech Republic

Service history
- In service: 2004-2025
- Used by: Czech Republic

Production history
- Designer: Nimda group
- Produced: 2003-2006
- No. built: 27 T-72M4 CZ; 3 T-72M4 CZ-W; 3 VT-72M4 CZ

Specifications
- Mass: 48 tonnes
- Length: 7.9 m
- Width: 3.6 m
- Height: 2.2 m
- Crew: 3 (commander, driver and gunner)
- Armor: Composite armour 570 mm (22.4 in) front of the turret
- Main armament: 125 mm 2A46M smoothbore tank gun
- Secondary armament: 7.62 mm PKMT coaxial machine gun, 12.7 mm NSVT AA machine gun on commander's ring-mount
- Engine: diesel Perkins Condor CV 12 1000 TCA; 1006 hp (746 kW)
- Power/weight: 21 hp/tonne (15,5 kW/tonne)
- Suspension: torsion bar
- Maximum speed: 64 km/h

The T-72M4 CZ is an upgraded Czech version of the Soviet-designed, Czechoslovakia made main battle tank T-72M. The only user of this tank is the Czech Army. Between 2003 and 2006, 30 tanks were produced. The main armament is a 125 mm gun 2A46M. The crew comprises a gunner, driver and commander. Maximum speed on the road is 64 km/h, and in terrain 44 km/h. This tank is comparable with third generation MBT. All tanks are still in active service.

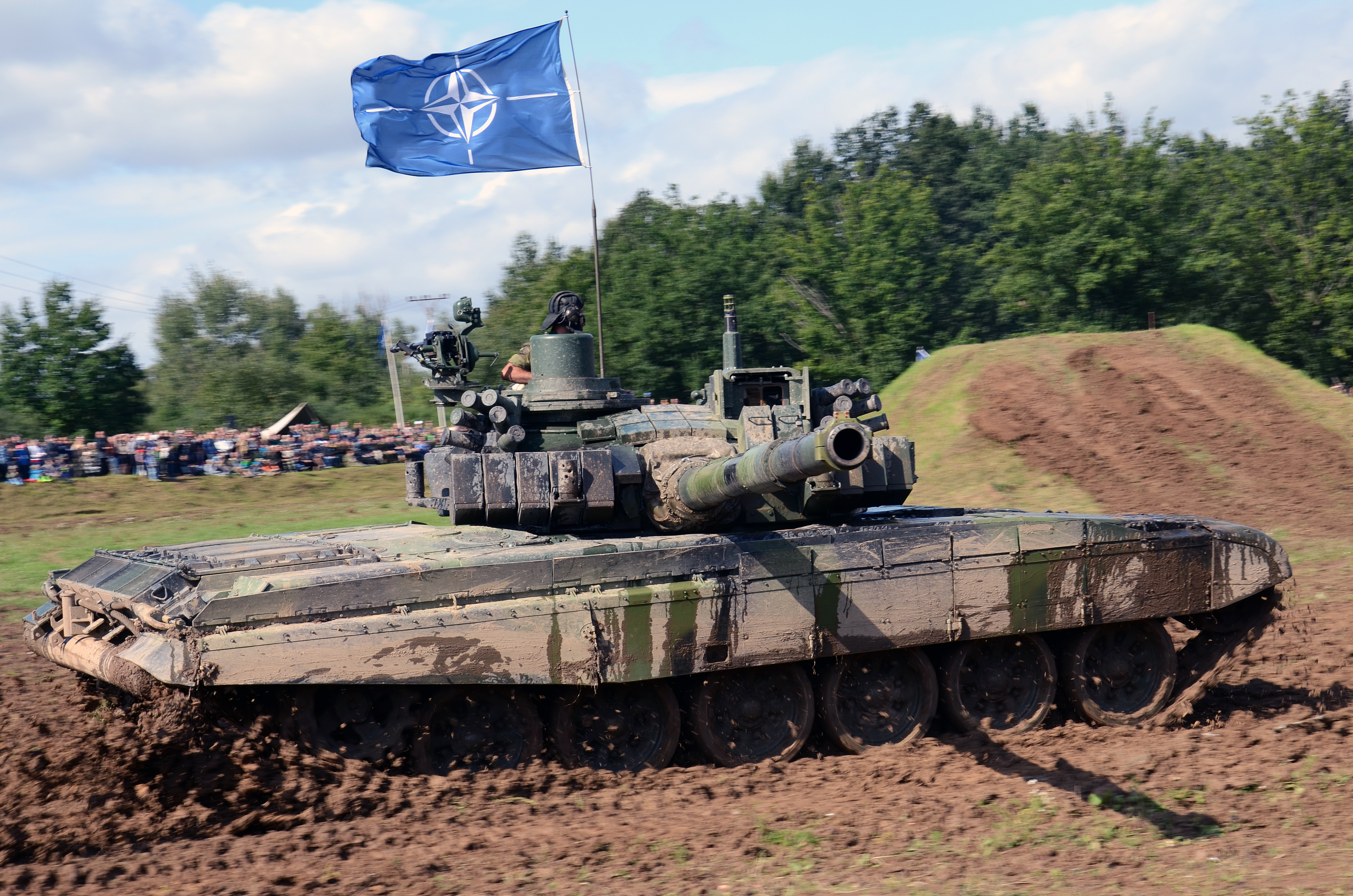
T-72M4CZ during Tank Day in Lešany, Benešov district, 2013

In October 2025, the Czech Army published its plan to hand over all of the tanks, which just finished a three-year long deep refurbishment, to Ukraine.

== Upgrade ==
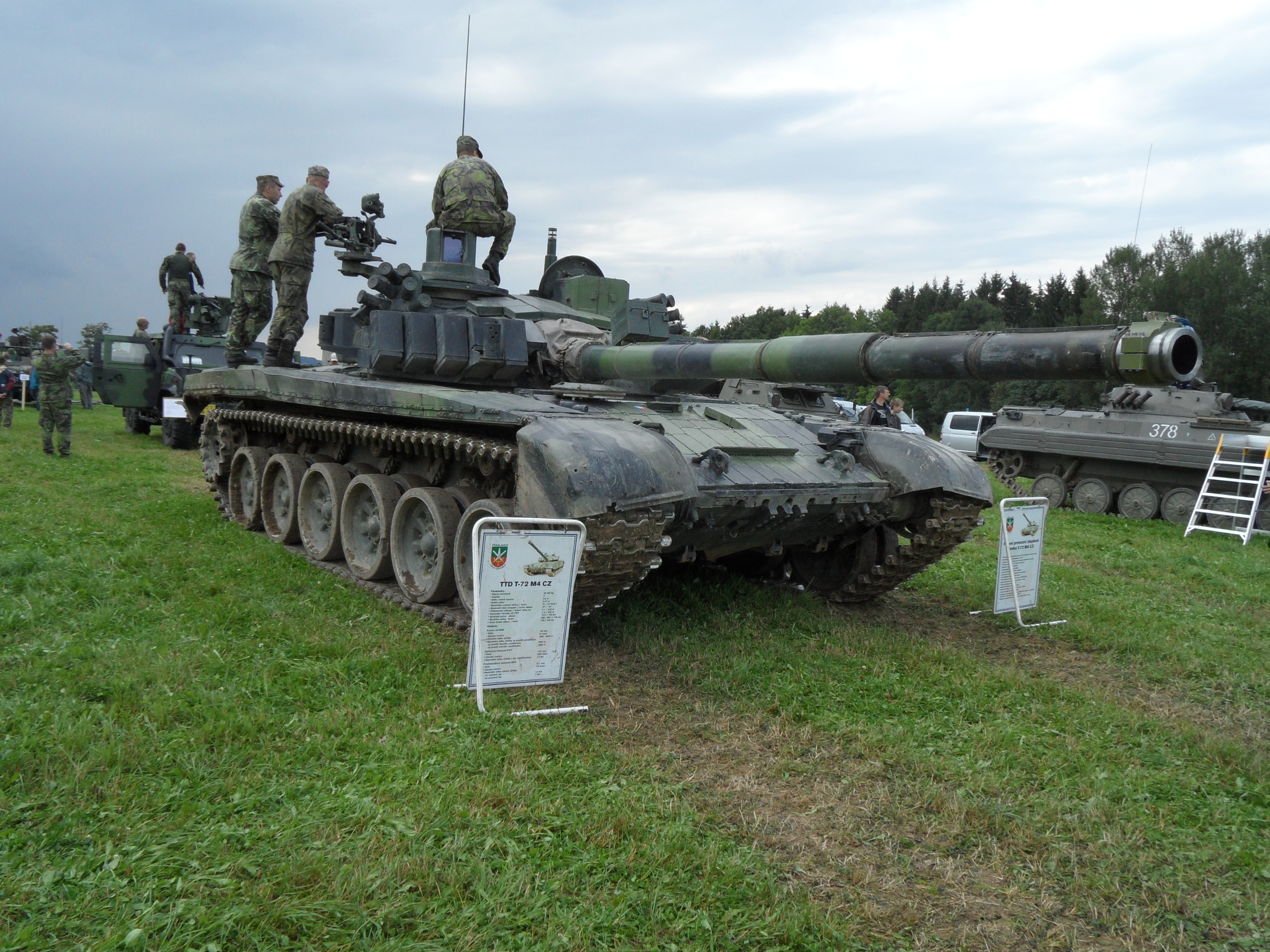
T-72M4CZ

T-72M4CZ firing.

The main goal of modernization was to achieve combat parameters and utility properties of 3rd - 4th generation tanks. The upgrade increased the firepower by conducting effective fire from place or while moving and increased the effects of under-caliber projectiles with a completely new ammunition for the tank cannon and the possibility of observation by day and night. The new powerplant and the modification of the chassis significantly contributed to increasing the mobility and maneuverability of the tank. Passive and active tank protection in combat was also increased by attaching dynamic body protection and turret protection, reinforcing the armor and body modification, laser detection and indication system, new protective smoke grenade and protective masking system (against visual, infra and radiolocation survey).

The upgrade was a joint venture between Nimda, Finmeccanica - Selex Galileo of Italy and VOP CZ (VOP025). The upgrade consists of a new powerpack in the form of Perkins Condor CV 12, Allison XTG-411-6N automatic transmission and Selex Galileo TURMS/T Fire Control System. The navigation system was upgraded with NBV-97, which was developed by Letecké Přístroje Praha SRO and a new communications suite has been added.

For protection, a new ERA called DYNA (DYNamic Armour) developed in the Czech Republic was added along with full NBC protection and a fire detection and suppression system by German company Kidde Deugra.

== Deep Refurbishment Failure ==
A deep refurbishment for the T-72M4CZ was underway from 2022 to 2025. Refurbishment of all 30 tanks was expected to be finished by 31 December 2025. In December 2025 the modernisation was cancelled, due to technical problems identified during testing. In a statement the Czech Ministry of Defense said: "The problems arose due to the error coefficient of individual electronic components of the fire control system. Repair of these elements is impossible". Due to the technicals problems, the high cost for a complete replacement of the fire control systems the Ministry of Defence decided to withdraw these tanks from service and started negotiating a compensation from VOP CZ.

== Variants ==
- T-72M4 CZ-W - command version of T-72M4 CZ.
- VT-72M4 CZ - recovery tank variant based on T-72M4 CZ for Czech Army.

== Operators ==
- Czech Republic: All 30 tanks operated by 73rd tank battalion of the 7th Mechanized Brigade

== See also ==
- T-72 operators and variants
