= 102nd Reconnaissance Battalion of General Karel Paleček =

- Active: 1 December 2003 – present
- Allegiance: Czech Republic
- Branch: Czech Land Forces
- Type: Special operations forces
- Size: Battalion
- Part of: 53rd Reconnaissance and Electronic Warfare Regiment
- Garrison/HQ: Prostějov
- Patron: General Karel Paleček
- Motto: Latin: Spem retine – spes una hominem nec morte relinquit
- Anniversaries: 1 December

Commanders
- Current commander: LTC Pavel HRINIK

The 102nd Reconnaissance Battalion of General Karel Paleček (Czech: 102. průzkumný prapor generála Karla Palečka) is a special operations unit in the Czech Land Forces based in Prostějov that specialized in irrgular warfare, long-range penetration, and special reconnaissance for tactical gathering intelligence. It falls under the command of the 53rd Reconnaissance and Electronic Warfare Regiment. Considered to be the most versatile military reconnaissance unit of the Czech Land Forces as a special operations forces.

== Organization ==
The 102nd Reconnaissance Battalion currently consists of:

- Headquarters
- Long-range Reconnaissance Company
  - Parachutists trained to infiltrate an objective via helicopter, fixed-wing aircraft or static line in order to conduct reconnaissance of an area ranging from 25 to 50 kilometres square within 24 hours. They can remain undetected in the vicinity of such objective area for up to 15 days, performing reconnaissance operations using the full spectrum of Czech Army equipment to complete their given mission. They are also able to perform highly selective limited attacks or ambushes if required.
- 1st Reconnaissance Company
  - Similar in role to the Long-range Reconnaissance Company, the personnel of the 1st Reconnaissance Company are able to parachute in to an objective and remain there for three days without resupply. A sub-unit of the company is equipped with the LRD-130 Kajman.
- 2nd Reconnaissance Company
  - Performs the same mission as the 1st Reconnaissance Company, however is equipped with the Iveco LMV.
- HUMINT Company
  - This company is tasked with collecting information, interrogating and conversing with human sources.
- UAV Reconnaissance Company
  - Operating the AeroVironment RQ-11 Raven and Boeing Insitu ScanEagle, this company provides aerial reconnaissance in support of Battalion operations.
- Logistic Company
  - The company provides direct logistic support to the battalion in the forms of transportation, intermediate level supply, maintenance and repairs.
- Active Reserve Company
  - Part of the battalion since 2007, the Active Reserve Reconnaissance Company comprises two platoons and two recce sections/teams. Generally used for reinforcing active units in times of crises, soldiers in this company are trained in intelligence, surveillance and reconnaissance. Aiming to be deployable together with the Long-range Reconnaissance Company and 2nd Reconnaissance Company, the Active Reserve Company is partly a parachute and a non-parachute force element.

== History ==
=== Formation ===
The battalion was formed in 2003 after a merger of four different reconnaissance battalions - the 2nd, 4th, 7th and 11th Reconnaissance Battalions. The battalion was activated on 1 December in Prostějov. Part of Joint Forces Command, it became the only reconnaissance battalion in the Czech Army and since 2011 has come under the command of the 53rd Regiment of Reconnaissance and Electronic Warfare.

=== Military operations and deployments ===
Former Yugoslavia

- KFOR (from 2003–10)
- EUFOR (2006)

Afghanistan

- ISAF Feyzabad (2005–07)
- ISAF Logar (2008–13)
- ISAF Bagram (from 2014)

Iraq

- MNF-I Shaibah (2004–05)

Mali

- EUTM Mali (2015)

=== International exercises ===
- ERNA RIAD (Estonia 2007)
- SFIR (Romania 2011–2015)
- GROUND PEPPER (Slovakia 2014)
- KHAAN QUEST (Mongolia 2014, 2015, 2016)
- ALLIED SPIRIT (Germany 2015)

=== Reconnaissance Patrol Competition ===
The Reconnaissance Patrol Competition is a national military patrolling exercise that makes its participating units cover more than 100 kilometers in three days while performing numerous types of military tasks. It is a test of leadership, self-discipline, courage, physical endurance, determination and knowledge of wide range of reconnaissance skills.

The history of this event which is organized uniquely by the 102nd Reconnaissance Battalion reaches back to 2006. The initial idea was to compare the level of skills and readiness of reconnaissance troops within the battalion but it was the year later when the competition was opened to other units of the Czech Army. This event usually takes place at the end of August. Due to its demanding nature, severe condition and physical challenge only two thirds of contestants usually finish this competition.

=== Charity events ===
Charity events have been organized annually by the 102nd Reconnaissance Battalion since 2009 in order to raise money for children in need. Handing over of the charity voucher is usually connected with sport activities and social events organized for service members, their families and guests.

=== Visitors' and Presentation Day ===
Visitors' and Presentation Day of the 102nd Reconnaissance Battalion has been annually organized for children from Prostějov as well as for service members and their families. The program usually includes a presentation of military vehicles, weapons and equipment. Visitors can also watch a training display of parachute jumps, a demonstration of the MUSADO military combat system, or a simulated ambush. This event takes place in June.

=== Notable members ===
ISAF killed in action in Afghanistan

- WO1 in memoriam Radim Vaculik (8 April 1979 to 30 April 2008, Pol-e'Alam, Lógar)

Bronze Star Medal recipients

- Staff Sergeant Michal Novotný received Bronze Star Medal in November 2011 in Afghanistan for saving life of an American soldier who lost both legs and a hand.

== Equipment ==
- Assault rifle CZ-805 BREN A2
- Pistol CZ-75 SP-01 Phantom
- Parachute OVP 80.08
- Ram-air parachute
- Mini UAV RQ-11 Raven
- UAV ScanEagle
- Off-road vehicle UAZ-469
- Four-wheel-drive off-road vehicle Land Rover Defender 90/110
- Four-wheel-drive off-road vehicle Land Rover Defender 130 KAJMAN
- Light armored tactical vehicle Iveco LMV
- Medium truck Tatra 810
- Military troop and cargo carrier Tatra 815

== Commanders ==
- 1 December 2003 to 30 September 2008 – LTC Jindřich STARÝ
- 1 October 2008 to 31 December 2010 – LTC Pavel ANDRÁŠKO
- 1 January 2011 to 30 June 2016 - LTC René SABELA
- 1 July 2016 up to present – LTC Pavel HRINÍK

== Heraldry ==
=== Insignias ===
The 102nd Reconnaissance Battalion Patch has a circular shape depicting several objects which have symbolic meaning relating closely to the battalion, its sub-units or history. A white parachute represents the airborne-reconnaissance units, a pair of yellow wings represents the ability to conduct an aerial reconnaissance, a pair of yellow bolts used to represent Electronic Warfare unit which used to be a part of the 11th Reconnaissance Battalion, and nowadays it represents the ability to pass the information quickly from the battlefield and finally the assault knife which is a symbol of a long-range reconnaissance unit. The dark green color of the background of the patch represents the color of reconnaissance units in general as well as the color of scout's berets, while the dark red edge of the circle represents the color of paratrooper forces and their berets. The battalion motto is Latin: Spem retine – spes una hominem nec morte relinquit (Cato) – ("Keep hold of hope; hope alone does not desert a person even in death").

=== Combat Flag and Commemorative Ribbons ===
The 102nd Reconnaissance Battalion gained its Combat Flag on the 5 May 2005 on the occasion of the celebration of the 60th anniversary of the end of World War II.

Commemorative Ribbons awarded to the 102nd Reconnaissance Battalion and designed to be displayed together with the Combat Flag:

- Commemorative Ribbon of Československé obce legionářské awarded on 27 April 2005
- Honorary Commemorative Ribbon of the city of Prostějov awarded on 27 September 2005
- Ribbon carrying the honorary name of the patron of the 102nd Reconnaissance Battalion of "generála Karla Palečka" awarded on 8 May 2006
- Commemorative Ribbon of JAGELLO 2000 Association awarded on 20 September 2008

== Honorary name and patron ==
Honorary name was awarded to 102nd Reconnaissance Battalion in 2006 and since then the full name of the battalion has been the 102nd Reconnaissance Battalion of General Karel Paleček. General Karel Paleček, the patron of the 102nd Reconnaissance Battalion, was a Czech legionary, active military member during World War I and World War II, and the founder of the first Czechoslovak parachute units.
