= Yuri Kobzarev =

Russian scientist

Yuri Borisovich Kobzarev
- Born: Yuri Borisovich Kobzarev; Юрий Борисович Кобзарев; 8 December 1905; Voronezh, Russian Empire
- Died: 25 April 1992 (aged 86); Moscow, USSR
- Occupations: specialist in the field of radio engineering and radiophysics

Yuri Borisovich Kobzarev (Russian: Юрий Борисович Кобзарев; 8 December 1905, Voronezh — 25 April 1992, Moscow) was a Russian scientist and a specialist in the field of radio engineering and radiophysics. He was also one of the founders of the radiolocation research school in USSR.

== Biography ==
Yuri Borisovich Kobzarev was born on November 25 (New Style: December 8) in 1905 in Voronezh. He graduated from Kharkov Institute of Public Education. In 1926 he began working at Ioffe Institute, where he developed a pulsed radar method, which was tested in 1937.

Under his guidance were created the first radar station for the long-range detection of aircraft RUS-2, the mobile version of Pegmatit radar and a number of subsequent radars. In 1941 he was awarded Stalin Prize for the creation of the first impulse radar in the USSR.

Since 1943, he was a member of the Council for Radar in the State Defense Committee. In 1944—1955 he was the head of the Department of Radiolocation in Moscow Power Engineering Institute. He formed the basic concepts of training courses for specialists in the field of radar and was the founder of the central course of the department "Principles of radar". In 1949 he became a Professor and a Doctor of Sciences.

From 1955 until his death Yuri Borisovich Kobzarev worked at Institute of Radio-engineering and Electronics. He also was one of the scientists who conducted academic research of psychokinesis phenomenon of Nina Kulagina and stated that it can not be explained by the appearance of electric and magnetic fields.

He died on April 25, 1992, in Moscow.
