= 7th Mechanized Brigade (Czech Republic) =

- 7. mechanizovaná brigáda
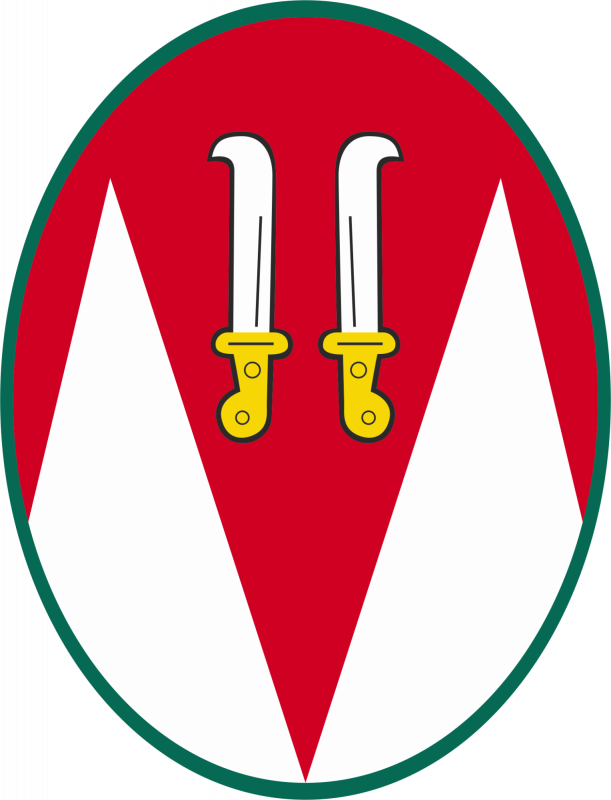
- 7th Mechanized Brigade Insignia
- Active: 1994–present
- Country: Czech Republic
- Branch: Czech Land Forces
- Type: Mechanized infantry
- Role: Ground Forces
- Size: Brigade
- Part of: Czech Land Forces
- Garrison/HQ: Hranice
- Nicknames: Dukelská, Moravská
- Motto: Facta verbis potentiora
- Engagements: SFOR; Kosovo Force; War in Iraq; War in Afghanistan
- Website: Official Website

Commanders
- Commander: Brigadier General Zdeněk Mikula
- Deputy Commander: Colonel Jiří Simmer
NATO Map Symbol
7

The 7th Mechanized Brigade ("Dukelská") is an Mechanized infantry brigade of the Czech Army based in Hranice. It is the Czech Army main heavy ground fighting unit for defence of Czech Republic and for EU and NATO alliance forces. It operates Leopard 2A4 main battle tanks (to be replaced by Leopard 2A8) and BVP-2 infantry fighting vehicles (to be replaced by CV90 MkIV). For fire support it uses SPM-85 PRAM-S and M1982 PRAM-L 120mm mortars.

== History ==
Activated on 1 October 1994 as a direct successor of 3rd Mechanized Division in Kroměříž during transformation of Czech Army from system of divisions to brigade sized units. It traces its roots to the 3rd Czechoslovak Independent Brigade in USSR during WWII that was transformed into the 3rd Infantry Division in Kroměříž.

At the time of creation, it was combined arms unit with 2 mechanized infantry battalions (71st and 73rd) that used BVP-1 IFV and T-54 tanks, 2 training centers (72nd and 74th), 7th reconnaissance battalion, 7th anti-tank battalion, and units of air defense, artillery, signal, medical, CBRN and support forces.

In 1997 the 72nd training center was moved to 6th Mechanized Brigade and its 61st mechanized and 6th engineer battalions were put under command of the 7th Brigade as a 72nd mechanized and 7th engineer battalions. In the same year the 74th training center was transformed into 74th mechanized battalion.

Anti-tank battalion was disbanded in 1999 and during the year 2003 most of the support units were disbanded as the brigade was transformed to pure mechanized infantry unit and the combat support forces were transferred under its own specialized brigades and the HQ of the 7th brigade was moved to barracks in Hranice. At the end of the 2003 the brigade was composed of HQ, 71st and 72nd mechanized infantry battalions, 73rd Combined Mechanized Battalion and 7th Logistic Battalion, that was disbanded a year later. The 73rd battalion was transformed to armored battalion on 1 January 2005.

In 2008 new subordinate unit was formed from disbanded 155th rescue battalion of the 15th Rescue Engineer Brigade, the 74th light motorized infantry battalion in Bučovice that was equipped with Iveco LMV vehicles. In 2020 it was transformed into 74th Mechanized Infantry Battalion and equipped with reactivated BVP-2s from deep storage.

By the Spring of 2025, the 7th Mechanized Brigade retired the T-72M1 tank from use and all serviceable T-72M1 tanks were donated to Ukraine due to Russian invasion of Ukraine (last tanks left Czechia in Spring 2025).

== Structure ==
The 7th Mechanized Brigade consist of the following elements in 2023. Each battalion have one company of active reserves in its structure.

- Headquarters (Hranice)
- 71st Mechanized Battalion "Sibiřský" (Hranice) (BVP-2)
- 72nd Mechanized Battalion "Generálmajora Josefa Buršíka" (Přáslavice) (BVP-2)
- 73rd Armored Battalion "Hanácký" (Přáslavice) (Leopard 2A4)
- 74th Mechanized Battalion "Plukovníka Bohuslava Malečka" (Bučovice) (BVP-2)
