= P-19 radar =

Soviet surveillance radar

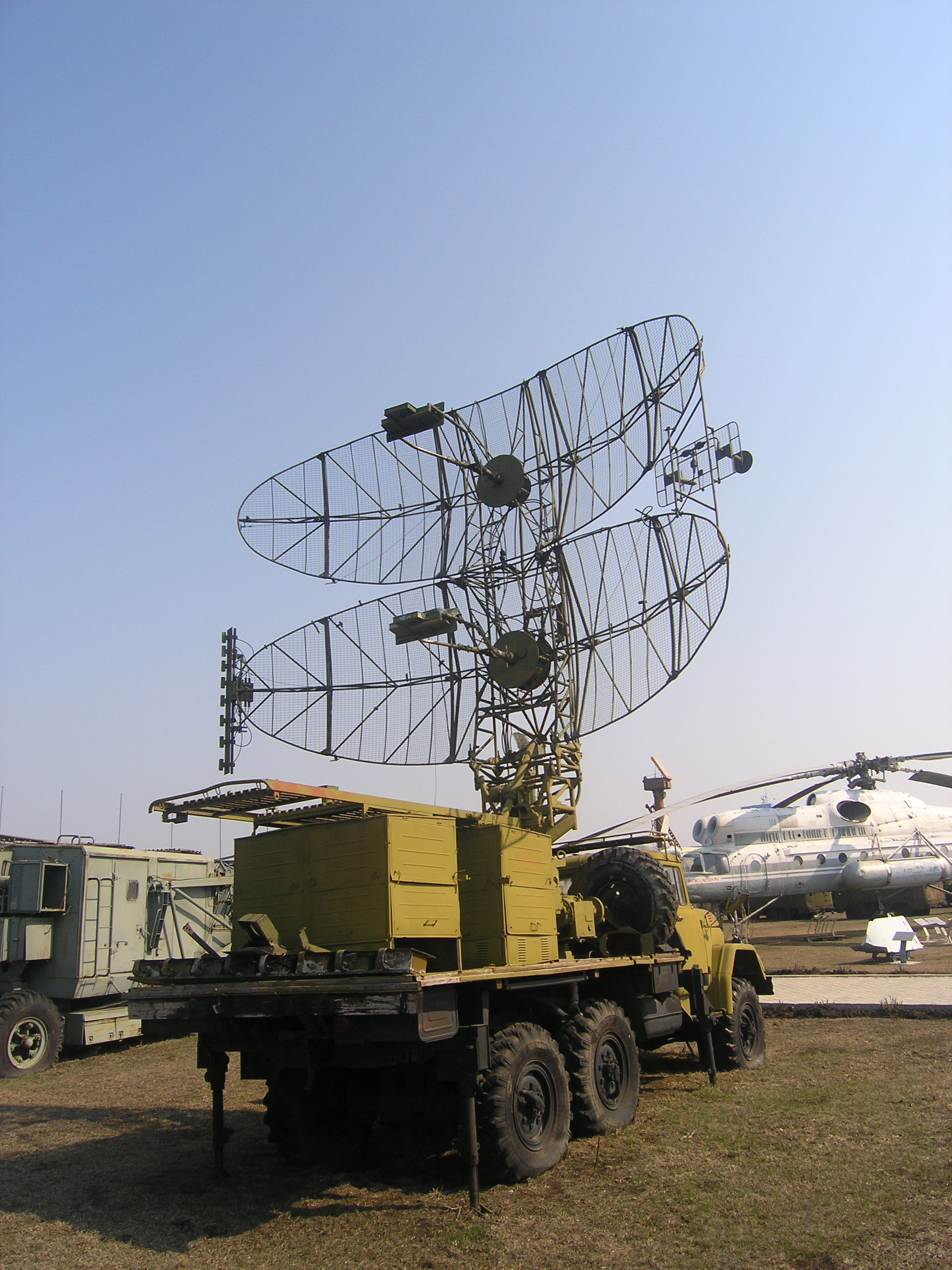
- In Togliatti Technical Museum
- Country of origin: Soviet Union
- Introduced: 1974
- Type: Surveillance/Target Acquisition
- Frequency: UHF
- Range: 260 km
- Azimuth: 360 degrees
- Power: 900 kW

The P-19 "Danube" (Russian: "Дунай") 1RL134 (also referred to by the NATO reporting name "Flat Face B" in the west) is a 2D UHF radar developed and operated by the former Soviet Union. The radar was also known by the name "Renata" in Poland and "Dunai" in the former German Democratic Republic.

== Development ==
The P-15 radar was upgraded to the point where it received a new designation, the P-19 "Danube". This new radar completed state trials and was accepted into service with the Soviet Air Defence Forces from 1974. The P-19 like the previous P-15 was designed to detect aircraft flying at low altitude and came to be associated with the S-125 "Neva" anti-aircraft system (NATO reporting name SA-3 "Goa"). The P-19 featured new electronics compared with the previous P-15 including a new magnetron transmitter. The P-19 is still in service today and was widely exported; many companies offer upgrade options to improve the performance and reliability of the radar and to replace out-dated components although the P-19 has been superseded by the newer Kasta series of radars.

== Description ==
The P-19 shares many of the physical features of the previous P-15 radar, the P-19 is a high mobility radar and with the antenna mounted on the single truck (Zil-131) with the electronic equipment contained in a second truck. The P-19 uses two open frame elliptical parabolic antenna accomplishing both transmission and reception, each antenna being fed by a single antenna feed in a similar fashion to the P-15. The radar can rapidly shift its frequency to one of four pre-set frequencies to avoid active interference with passive interference being removed by a coherent doppler filter. Azimuth was determined by mechanical scanning with an associated accompanying PRV-11 (NATO reporting name "Side Net") used to determine elevation. A secondary radar for IFF is generally used in conjunction with the P-15, generally the 1L22 "Parol". The armed forces of the Czech Republic described the P-19 as having "outstanding mechanical parameters, simple maintenance, overall reliability and multifunctionality". This evaluation was mirrored by a French evaluation of a radar captured in Chad in 1987 during the Chadian–Libyan conflict, describing the P-19 as sturdy, with good low altitude detection and high resistance to countermeasures.

== Variants ==
P-19MA/P-190U – ground-based long-range VHF surveillance radar P-180U is offered as the modernized follow-on to its prototype, the analogue P-19. Produced in LiTak-Tak (Lithuania).

Radar features:

- maximum use of COTS components;
- stable, fail-soft, modular solid-state transmitter;
- built-in test equipment;
- no special adjustments required during operation;
- largely simplified maintenance;
- engineered for minimum cost of ownership.

As a result of modernization the radar's detection performance is efficiently improved. Modernized radar features automatic tracking capability as well as data receiving from other radar sensors. Data can be exchanged over a variety of communication channels in approved format.

== Operators ==
The P-19 was operated by the Soviet Union from 1974 and though it has since become obsolete, it was passed down to successor states after the fall of the Soviet Union. It has been exported and continues to serve around the world.

P19 is a decimetric wave radar. Its frequency is 830 to 875 MHz.

== See also ==
- P-15 radar
- List of radars
