= P-15 radar =

Soviet early warning radar

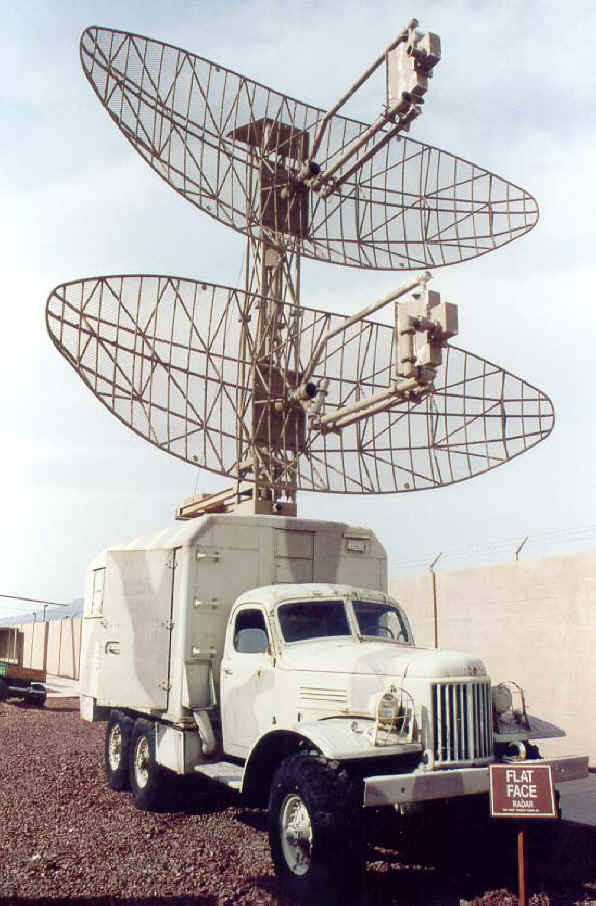
- P-15 Flat Face A at Nellis AFB
- Country of origin: Soviet Union
- Introduced: 1955
- Type: Surveillance/Target Acquisition
- Frequency: UHF
- Range: 150 km
- Altitude: 3 km
- Diameter: 11 meters
- Azimuth: 360 degrees
- Elevation: 2-14 degrees
- Precision: 0.3 km range
- Power: 270 kW

The P-15 "Tropa" (Russian: "Тропа"; English: "trail") or 1RL13 (also referred to by the NATO reporting name "Flat Face A" in the west) is a 2D UHF radar developed and operated by the former Soviet Union. Usually it was used over Zil-131 and Zil-157's chassis in systems as SA-3 "Goa" / S-125 "Newa".

== Development ==
In 1952 SRI-244 started development of what become the P-15 early warning radar; by 1955, the radar had passed state trials and was accepted into service with the anti-aircraft troops of the Soviet armed forces. The P-15 was designed to detect aircraft flying at low altitude and came to be associated with the S-125 "Neva" anti-aircraft system (NATO reporting name SA-3 "Goa"), though it was later replaced by the P-15M2 "Squat Eye" radar which mounted a single radar antenna on a 20-30 meter mast to improve coverage.

In 1959, the modernised P-15M "trail" radar passed through the state test program, the modernisation replacing outdated mercury-based electronics. In 1962, another modernisation of the P-15 passed through trials as the P-15N, the radar being developed and produced by the Ulyanovsk Mechanical Plant. The P-15N introduced a more sensitive receiver, which improved the detection range and a new amplifier for the transmitter. Further improvements were made in 1970 when the P-15MN passed trials. The P-15MN included a pulse coherent Doppler filter (moving target indicator) to remove passive clutter (by up to 50 dB), the first such radar in the Soviet Union. Finally by 1974, the modernisation of the P-15 was so extensive that it resulted in a new designation, the P-19 "Danube", also known as the 1RL134. The P-19 is known in the west as the Flat Face B.

== Description ==
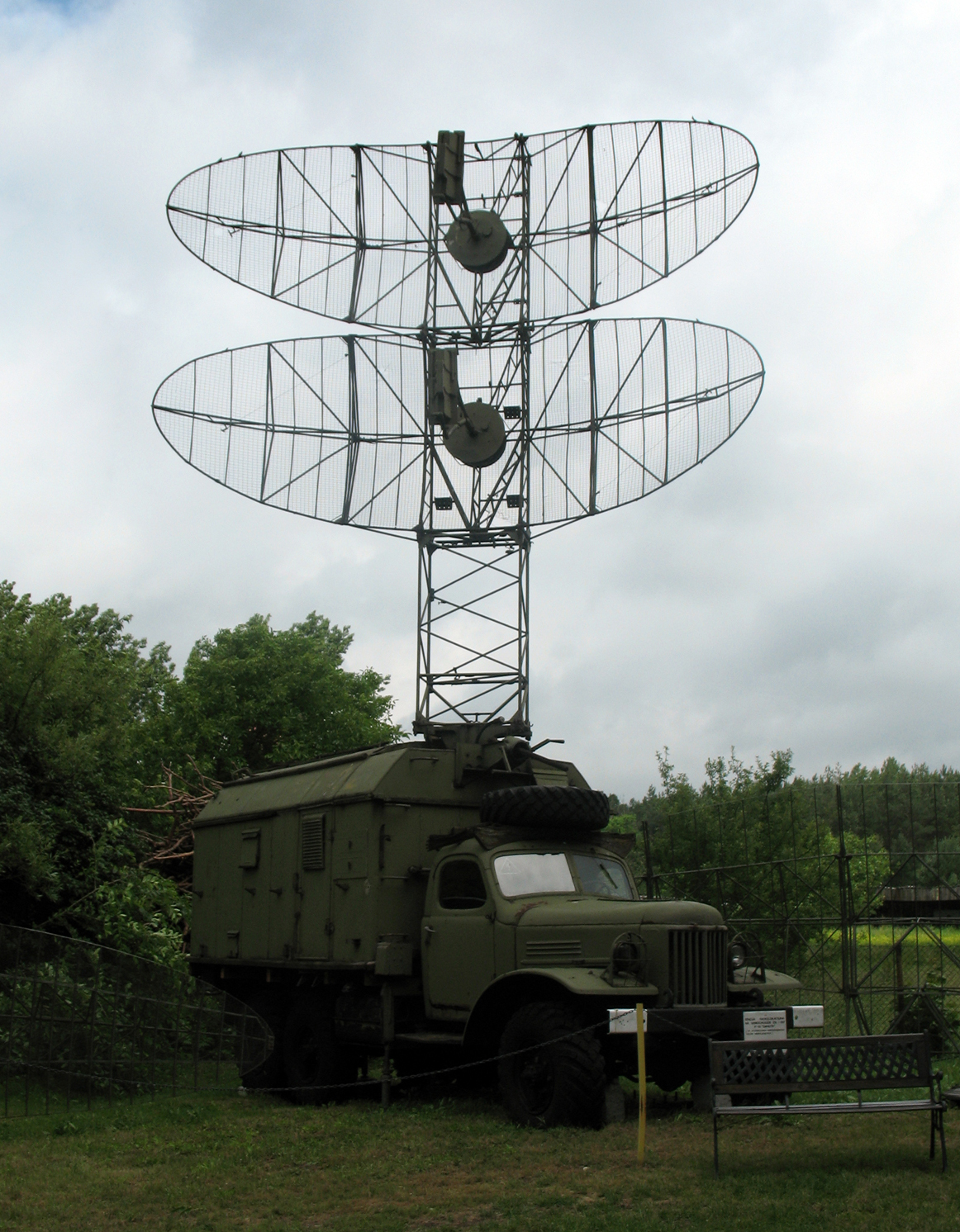
P-15 Radar

The P-15 is a high mobility radar. With the antenna mounted directly on the single truck (Zil-157) used for transport, the system could be deployed and taken down in no more than 10 minutes. The P-15 uses two open frame elliptical parabolic antenna accomplishing both transmission and reception, each antenna being fed by a single antenna feed. The radar can rapidly shift its frequency to one of four pre-set frequencies to avoid active interference, with passive interference being removed by a coherent doppler filter. Azimuth was determined by mechanical scanning with an associated accompanying PRV-11 (NATO reporting name "Side Net") used to determine elevation. A secondary radar for IFF is generally used in conjunction with the P-15, generally the 1L22 "Parol".

== Operators ==
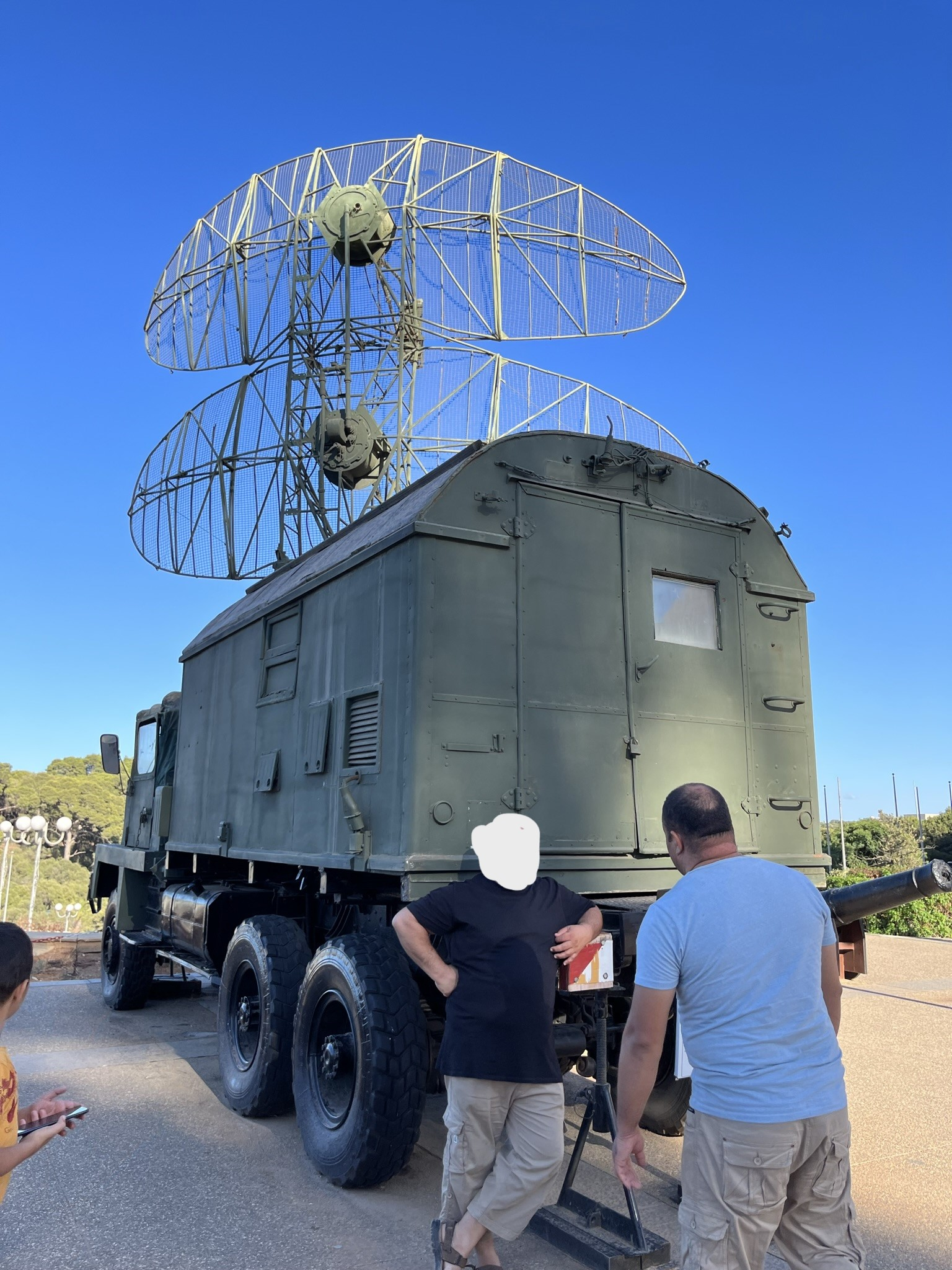
Algerian P-15 radar on display at the Army Museum

- Algeria
- Armenia
- East Germany
- Finland - The P-15 was operated by Finland as part of the S-125 Neva/Pechora system.
- Syria
- Soviet Union – The P-15 was operated by the Soviet Union from 1955. It has since become obsolete, but it was passed down to successor states after the fall of the Soviet Union. It was largely superseded by its successor the P-19.

== See also ==
- P-19 radar
- List of radars
