= Type 500 training mine =

Type 500 training mine was jointly developed by Fengxi Machinery Factory (汾西机器厂) and the First Division of the

. This training mine is very similar to the Training-1 training bottom mine except that Type 500 training mine can be planted by aircraft. It is used to train pilots to drop mines into the ocean. Like the Training-1 training bottom mine, this mine can also be rapidly converted into live round by adopting warheads on regular mines.
