= Xun-1 =

The Training-1 (Chinese: 训-1, Transliterated: Xun-1) training bottom mine is a training naval mine developed by Fengxi Machinery Factory (Chinese: 汾西机器厂) in China, and was accepted into service in November 1982. The Training-1 mine could be used to train for every bottom mine in the Chinese inventory, as well as for minesweeping training. When the training is completed, a high pressure gas valve is released, and the training bottom mine would float to the surface for recovery.

== See also ==
- Type 500 training mine
