= List of anti-ship missiles =

Missile list

This is a list of anti-ship missiles.

== World War II ==
- BHT-38 – France
- Ruhrstahl/Kramer SD 1400 X (Fritz X) — Nazi Germany
- Henschel Hs 293 — Nazi Germany
- Henschel Hs 294 — Nazi Germany
- Blohm & Voss BV 143 — Nazi Germany (prototype)
- Blohm + Voss BV 246 (Hagelkorn) — Nazi Germany (prototype)
- Igo – Empire of Japan
- Ohka piloted suicide missile – Empire of Japan
- Bat – United States Used in combat only once.

== Asia ==
=== India ===
- BrahMos – Supersonic cruise missile (range of 800+ km) jointly developed by India and Russia. (Operational)
- Nirbhay – Anti-ship cruise missile with the range of 1,000 km to 1,500 km at the speed of 0.7 to 0.9 mach.(Operational)
- BrahMos-NG – Miniaturized version of the Brahmos. (Under development)
- BrahMos-II - Mach 7 Hypersonic cruise missile (range of 1000 km). (Under development)
- Dhanush – A system consisting of stabilization platform and missiles, which has the capability to launch
- Agni-P - May be developed into Anti-ship ballistic missile and "carrier killer".
- NASM-SR – DRDO Naval Anti-Ship Missile Short Range (Range 55+ km) for Helicopter. (Under developmental trial)
- NASM-MR – DRDO Naval Anti-Ship Missile Medium Range (Range 290+ km). (Under development)
- LRAShM – Conventional hypersonic missile for anti-ship role (Range >1,500 km). (Under developmental trial)

=== Indonesia ===
- RN01-SS, anti-ship and land attack missile, currently under development.

=== Iran ===
- Ra'ad – Indigenously developed long-range anti-ship missile based on HY-2 Silkworm.
- Noor – upgraded copy of Chinese C-802.
- Tondar – upgraded copy of Chinese C-801. Similar to Noor but powered by solid rocket booster and range of 50 km.
- Thaqeb – Similar to Noor, modified for submarine launch.
- Nasr – Several versions based on TL-6, C-704 and C-705.
- Kowsar 1/2/3 – Several versions based on Chinese C-701, TL-10 and C-704.
- Fajre Darya – copy of Sea Killer II.
- Zafar (anti-ship missile)
- Persian Gulf (Khalij Fars) – Anti ship ballistic missile based on Fateh-110.
- Qader – Iranian anti-ship cruise missile with a range over 200 km.
- Ghader (missile)

=== Iraq ===
Al Salah-Ad-Din

=== Israel ===
- Gabriel (missile)-made by Israel Aircraft Industries (IAI)
- Luz (missile)
- Naval Spike
- Sea Breaker
- LORA - (LOng Range Artillery), a theater quasi-ballistic missile which can be ship-launched from inside of a standard Intermodal container

=== Japan ===
- Type 80 air-to-ship missile (ASM-1)
- Type 88 surface-to-ship missile (SSM-1)
- Type 90 ship-to-ship missile (SSM-1B)
- Type 91 air-to-ship missile (ASM-1C)
- Type 93 air-to-ship missile (ASM-2)
- Type 12 surface-to-ship missile
- XASM-3

=== North Korea ===
- Hwasal-2 (KN-28)
- P-15 (KN-01/Kumsong-1)
- Kumsong-3 (KN-19), land & coastal
- P-35 (Kumsong-2)
- Silkworm (also share KN-01 designation with P-15 variant)
- C-802
- C-602
- Padasuri-6

=== Pakistan ===
- Zarb – Subsonic anti-ship cruise missile
- Hatf-VIII (Ra'ad) – Air-launched anti-ship cruise missile
- Babur – land-attack cruise missile capable of anti-ship roles
- Harbah missile — Anti-ship cruise missile with land attack capability
- P282 SMASH

=== People's Republic of China ===
- Silkworm missile: The SY (Chinese: 上游; pinyin: Shàngyóu; lit. 'Upstream'), and HY (Chinese: 海鹰; pinyin: Hǎiyīng; lit. 'Sea Eagle') series were early anti-ship cruise missiles (ASCM) developed by the People's Republic of China from the Soviet P-15 Termit missile. They entered service in the late 1960s and remained the main ASCMs deployed by the People's Liberation Army Navy through the 1980s. The missiles were used by the PRC and export customers to develop land attack cruise missiles (LACM).
  - SY-1 – Chinese copy of the P-15 Termit. Export name: FL-1.
  - SY-1A – Improved SY-1 with terrian following
  - SY-2 – Redesigned SY-1; no longer a copy of the P-15. It can use the SY-1's launch equipment. Export name: FL-2
  - SY-2A – Extended-range version of the SY-2.
  - SY-2B – Improved SY-2A anti-ship missile with supersonic speed and low-level flight. Export name: FL-7
  - HY-1 – Improved SY-1 with extended range
  - HY-2 – Redesigned HY-1. Export name: C-201.
  - HY-2A – IR-guided version of HY-2
  - HY-2AII – Improved version of HY-2A
  - HY-2B – Improved HY-2 with mono-pulse radar seeker
  - HY-2BII – Improved HY-2B with new radar seeker
  - HY-3 – supersonic design with ramjet engine. Export name: C-301.
  - HY-4 – Turbojet powered version of HY-2. Export name: C-201W.
  - HY-41 – Improved HY-4. Export name: XM-41.
- YJ-1 – Surface/Air-launched supersonic anti-ship missile. Export name: C-101
- YJ-6 – Surface-launched subsonic anti-ship missile. developed from HY-2. 2,400 kg (5,300 lb) class. Export name: C-601.
  - YJ-61 – Air-launched subsonic anti-ship missile. 2,400 kg (5,300 lb) class.
  - YJ-63 – Air-launched subsonic anti-ship missile. 2,000 kg (4,400 lb) class.
  - YJ-62 – Surface-launched subsonic anti-ship missile with a major redesign. 1,400 kg (3,100 lb) class. Export name: C-602
- YJ-8 – Surface-launched subsonic anti-ship missile. 800 kg (1,800 lb) class. Export name: C-801.
  - YJ-8A – Surface-launched subsonic anti-ship missile. 800 kg (1,800 lb) class.
  - YJ-81 – Air-launched subsonic anti-ship missile. 800 kg (1,800 lb) class.
  - YJ-82 – Submarine-launched subsonic anti-ship missile. 800 kg (1,800 lb) class. Export name: CM-708.
- YJ-83 – Surface-launched subsonic anti-ship missile with turbojet. 800 kg (1,800 lb) class. Export name: C-802A.
  - YJ-83K – Air-launched subsonic anti-ship missile with turbojet. 600 kg (1,300 lb) class. Export name: C-802AK.
  - KD-88 – Air-launched subsonic anti-ship missile with turbojet. 600 kg (1,300 lb) class. Export name: CM-802AKG.
- YJ-9 – Surface/Air-launched subsonic anti-ship missile. 100 kg (220 lb) class. Export name: TL-10/FL-8.
  - TL-6 – Surface/Air-launched subsonic anti-ship missile. 350 kg (770 lb) class. Export only. Also called FL-9.
- C-701 – Surface/Air-launched subsonic anti-ship missile. 100 kg (220 lb) class. Export only.
  - C-704 – Surface/Air-launched subsonic anti-ship missile. 350 kg (770 lb) class. Export only.
  - C-705 – Surface/Air-launched subsonic anti-ship missile with turbojet. 350 kg (770 lb) class. Export only.
- CM-103 – Surface/Air-launched supersonic anti-ship missile. 350 kg (770 lb) class. Export only.
- YJ-12 – Surface/Air-launched supersonic anti-ship missile with ramjet. 2,500–3,000 kg (5,500–6,600 lb) class. Export name: CM-302.
- YJ-15 – Surface/Air-launched supersonic anti-ship missile with ramjet. 1,500 kg (3,300 lb) class.
- YJ-18 – Surface/Air-launched subsonic anti-ship missile with turbojet engine and supersonic dash. 1,500 kg (3,300 lb) class.
  - YJ-18C – Surface/Air-launched subsonic anti-ship missile with turbojet engine. 1,500 kg (3,300 lb) class.
- YJ-100 – Surface/Air-launched subsonic anti-ship missile with turbofan engine. 1,000 kg (2,200 lb) class.
- CM-400 – Air-launched supersonic anti-ship missile. 900 kg (2,000 lb) class. Export only.
- HD-1 – Surface-launched supersonic anti-ship missile with ramjet. 2,000 kg (4,400 lb) class. Export only.
- CX-1 – Surface-launched supersonic anti-ship missile with ramjet. 3,000 kg (6,600 lb) class. Export only.
- YJ-17 – Surface-launched hypersonic anti-ship missile.
- YJ-19 – Surface-launched hypersonic anti-ship missile.
- YJ-20 – Surface-launched hypersonic anti-ship missile.
- YJ-21 – Surface/Air-launched hypersonic anti-ship missile. Export name: YJ-21E/CM-401.

=== Republic of China – Taiwan ===
- Hsiung Feng I – Brave Wind I is a subsonic ship-to-ship developed by CIST in the 1970s, said to be based on the Israeli Gabriel missile.
- Hsiung Feng II – Brave Wind II is a subsonic missile with ship-to-ship, surface-to-ship, and air-to-ship versions. It is not an improved version of HF-I, but rather a new design.
- Hsiung Feng III – Brave Wind III is a state of the art supersonic (Mach 2-3) long range nuclear weapons capable scramjet ship-to-ship missile developed by CIST.

=== South Korea ===
- SSM-700K Haeseong
- 400mm-class Air-to-Ship Guided Missile-II

=== Viet Nam ===
- VCM-01

=== Turkey ===
- Atmaca – Atmaca is a long-range, all-weather, precision strike, anti-ship cruise missile developed by the Turkish company ROKETSAN
- SOM - SOM is a modern, autonomous, low observable, high precision air-launched cruise missile along with anti-ship capability.
- Çakır - Çakır is a modern cruise missile that can be used from air, land and sea assets and can be used against ground and naval based targets. It has different variants that can be used in different tasks. Some define it as a "smaller" Atmaca.

== Europe ==
=== Joint development ===
- Kormoran 2 – Germany/France; Used on Tornado IDS (INS and radar guidance)
- IDAS – Germany/Norway/Turkey; Made by Diehl/HDW/Kongsberg/Nammo/ROKETSAN (submarine-launched missile, also against air and land targets)
- Teseo/Otomat/Milas – originally Italian/French; Made by Otomelara, now joint European; Made by MBDA
- Martel – United Kingdom/France; Made by BAe/Matra (radar and video guidance variants)
- Future Cruise/Anti-Ship Weapon – A new missile being developed by MBDA for the Royal Navy, French Navy and Italian Navy
- Rb 08 – Sweden/France; Made by Saab
- RBS-15 Mk. III – originally Sweden; Made by Saab Bofors Dynamics, now joint Germany-Sweden, also produced by Diehl BGT Defence (also used land-attack missile)
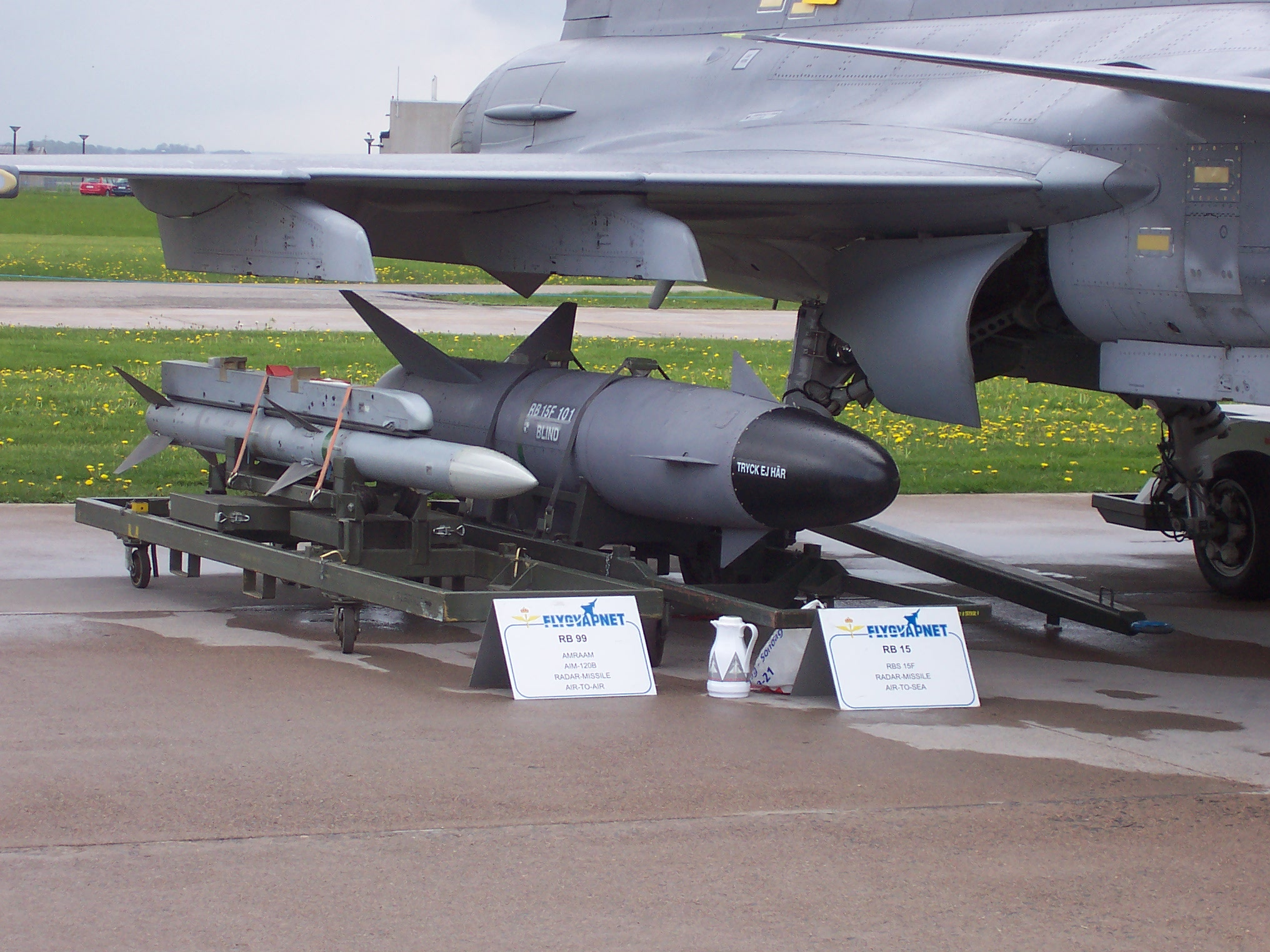
  RBS-15F anti-ship missile (right) under the wing of a JAS 39 Gripen fighter
- Super Sonic Strike Missile (3SM) Tyrfing – Norway/Germany

=== France ===
- Exocet – France; Made by Aérospatiale, now MBDA
  - Exocet MM38 surface-launched
  - Exocet AM39 air-launched
  - Exocet SM39 submarine-launched
  - Exocet MM40 surface-launched
- ANL (Anti-Navire Léger) – France; Anti-ship missile under development
- AS-30
- ARMAT – France; Made by Matra
- AS.12 – France; Built by Aérospatiale/Nord Aviation (visual guidance, wire controlled SACLOS)
- AS.15 – France; Built by Aérospatiale
- Malafon – France; Made by Latécoère
- Malaface – France; Made by Latécoère
- MMP – France; Made by MBDA

=== Italy ===
- Sea Killer/Marte – Italy; Made by MBDA

=== Norway ===
- AGM-119 Penguin – Norway; Made by Kongsberg Defence & Aerospace (KDA) (infrared homing)
- Naval Strike Missile (NSM) – Norway; Made by KDA (imaging infrared)

=== Serbia ===
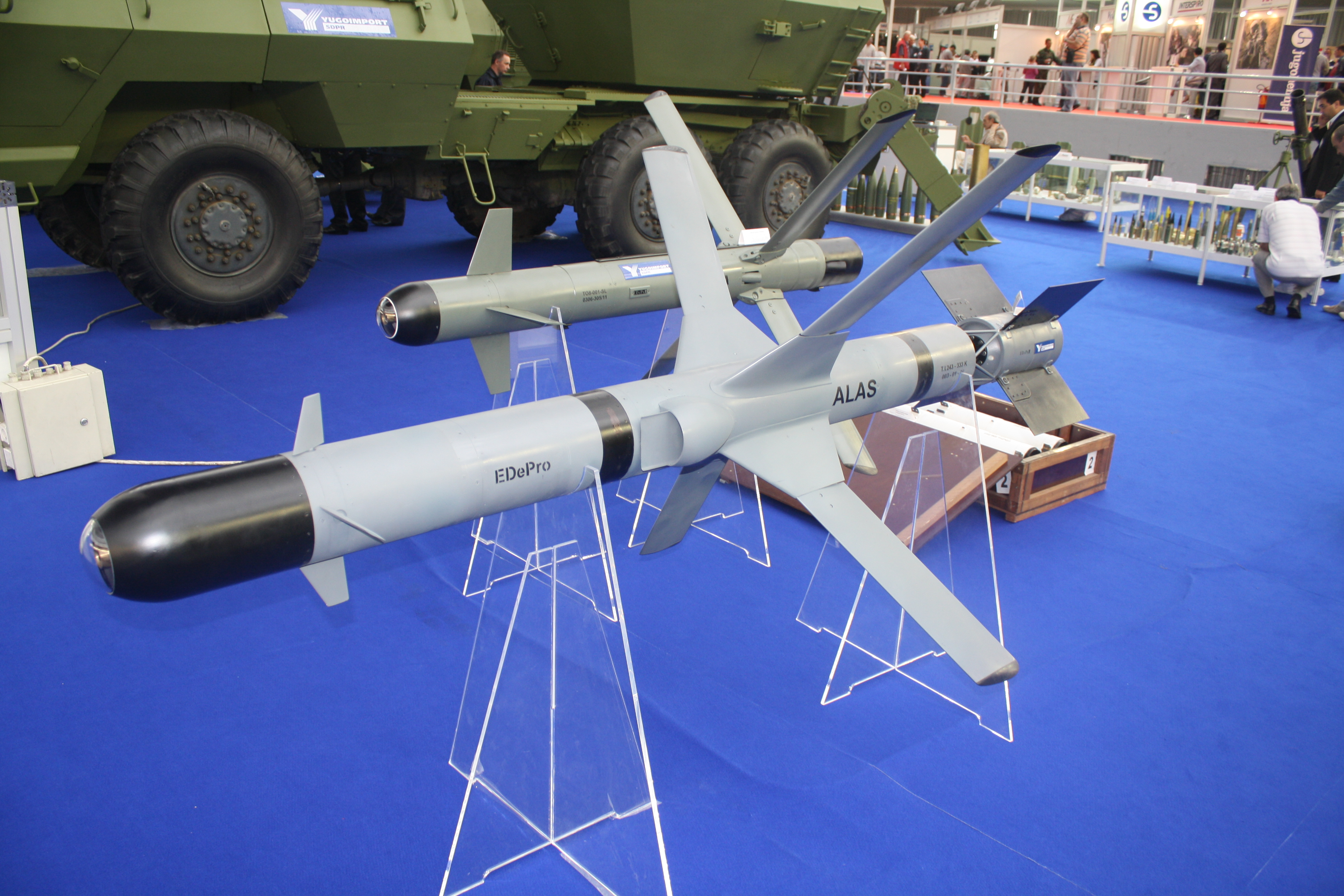
ALAS missile on display at Partner 2011 military fair, Belgrade

ALAS (missile)

=== Sweden ===
- RBS15; made by Saab Bofors Dynamics, now also joint Germany-Sweden, made by Diehl BGT Defence
- RB 04; made by Saab AB (historical use)

=== Ukraine ===
- R-360 Neptune

=== United Kingdom ===
- Sea Eagle – United Kingdom; Made by BAe
- Sea Skua – United Kingdom; Made by BAe
- SPEAR 3 – United Kingdom; Made by MBDA

=== USSR / Russian Federation ===
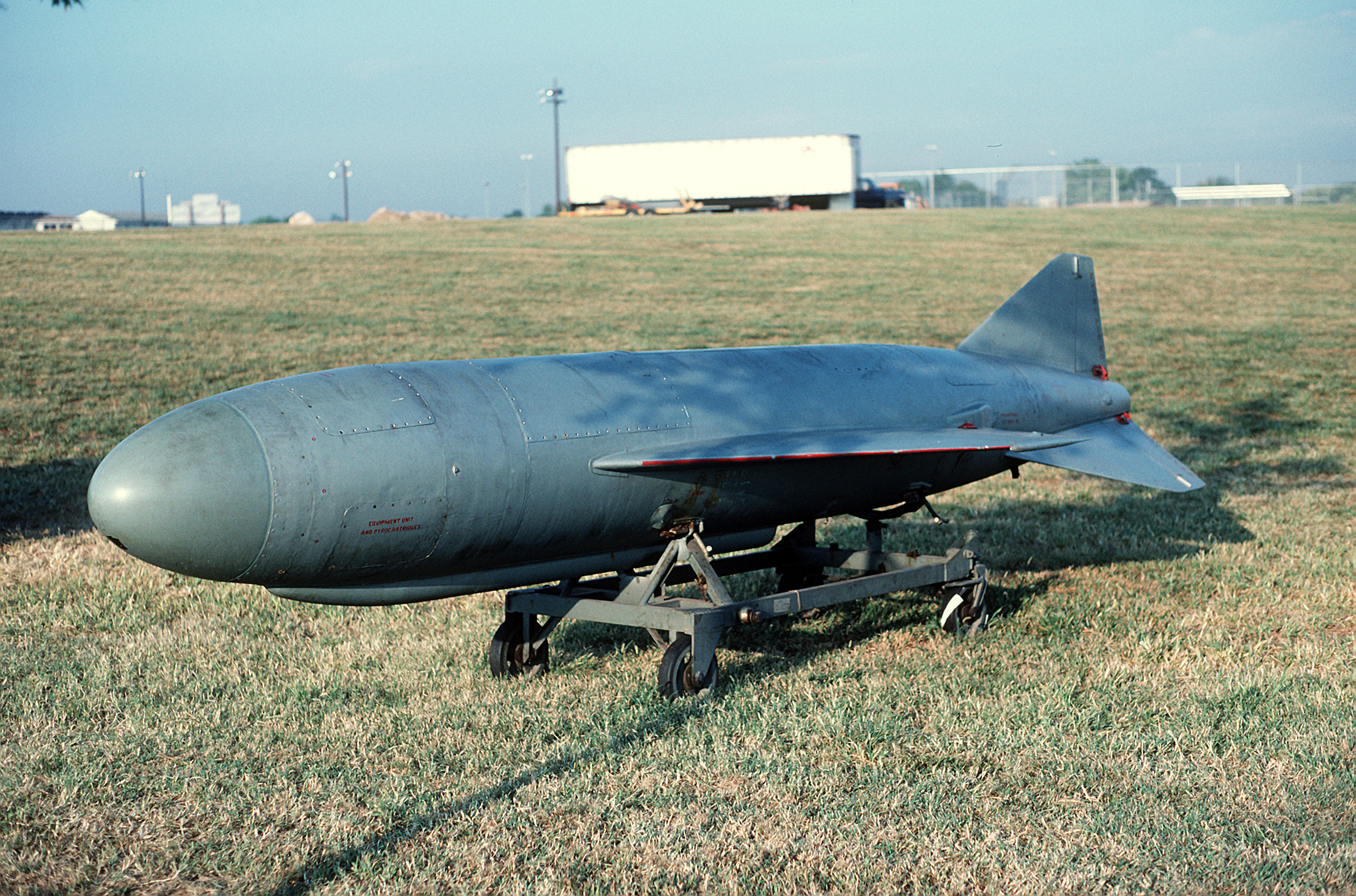
P-15 Termit (SS-N-2 Styx)

(Listed by official Soviet/Russian name, followed by GRAU designation and NATO reporting name in parentheses.)

- 10Kh 14KhK1 14Kh 18Kh 15kh 17kh
- KSShch
- KS-1 Komet
- K-10S
- KSR-5
- P-1 (GRAU: 4K32, NATO: SS-N-1 Scrubber)
- P-5 (GRAU: 4K34, NATO: SS-N-3 Sepal/Shaddock)
- P-15 Termit (GRAU: 4K40, NATO: SS-N-2 Styx)
- P-70 Ametist (GRAU: 4K66, NATO: SS-N-7 Starbright)
- P-80 Zubr (NATO: SS-N-22 Sunburn)
- P-120 Malakhit (GRAU: 4K85, NATO: SS-N-9 Siren)
- P-270 Moskit (GRAU: 3M80, NATO: SS-N-22 Sunburn)
- P-500 Bazalt (GRAU: 4K80, NATO: SS-N-12 Sandbox)
- P-700 Granit (GRAU: 3M45, NATO: SS-N-19 Shipwreck)
- Kh-22
- Kh-31A
- Kh-35 (GRAU 3M24, SS-N-25 Switchblade)
- Kh-59 (antinaval AShM variants)
- P-750 Grom (GRAU: 3M25, NATO: SS-N-24 Scorpion, Kh-80)
- P-800 Oniks (GRAU: 3M55, NATO: SS-NX-26 Oniks/Yakhont)
- K-300P Bastion-P
- PJ-10 BrahMos – Supersonic cruise missile (range of 290 km) jointly developed by India and Russia from SS-NX-26.
- P-900 (GRAU: 3M51, NATO: SS-N-27 Club) (ASW, ASuW and land-attack versions) Klub (SS-N-27) ASCM
- P-900 Alfa
- P-1000 Vulkan (GRAU: 3M70, NATO: SS-N-12 Mod 2 Sandbox)
- Raduga Kh-15 (NATO: AS-16 Kickback)
- RPK-2 Viyuga (NATO: SS-N-15 Starfish) (ASW)
- RPK-3 Metel (NATO: SS-N-14 Silex) (ASW with ASuW mode)
- RPK-6 Vodopad (NATO: SS-N-16 Stallion) (ASW)
- RPK-7 Vorobei (NATO: SS-N-16 Stallion) (ASW)
- RPK-9 Medvedka (NATO: SS-N-29) (ASW) RPK-9 Medvedka SS-N-29
- 3M-54 Klub (NATO: SS-N-27A Sizzler)
- BrahMos-II
- Zircon (missile)
- Kh-47M2 Kinzhal
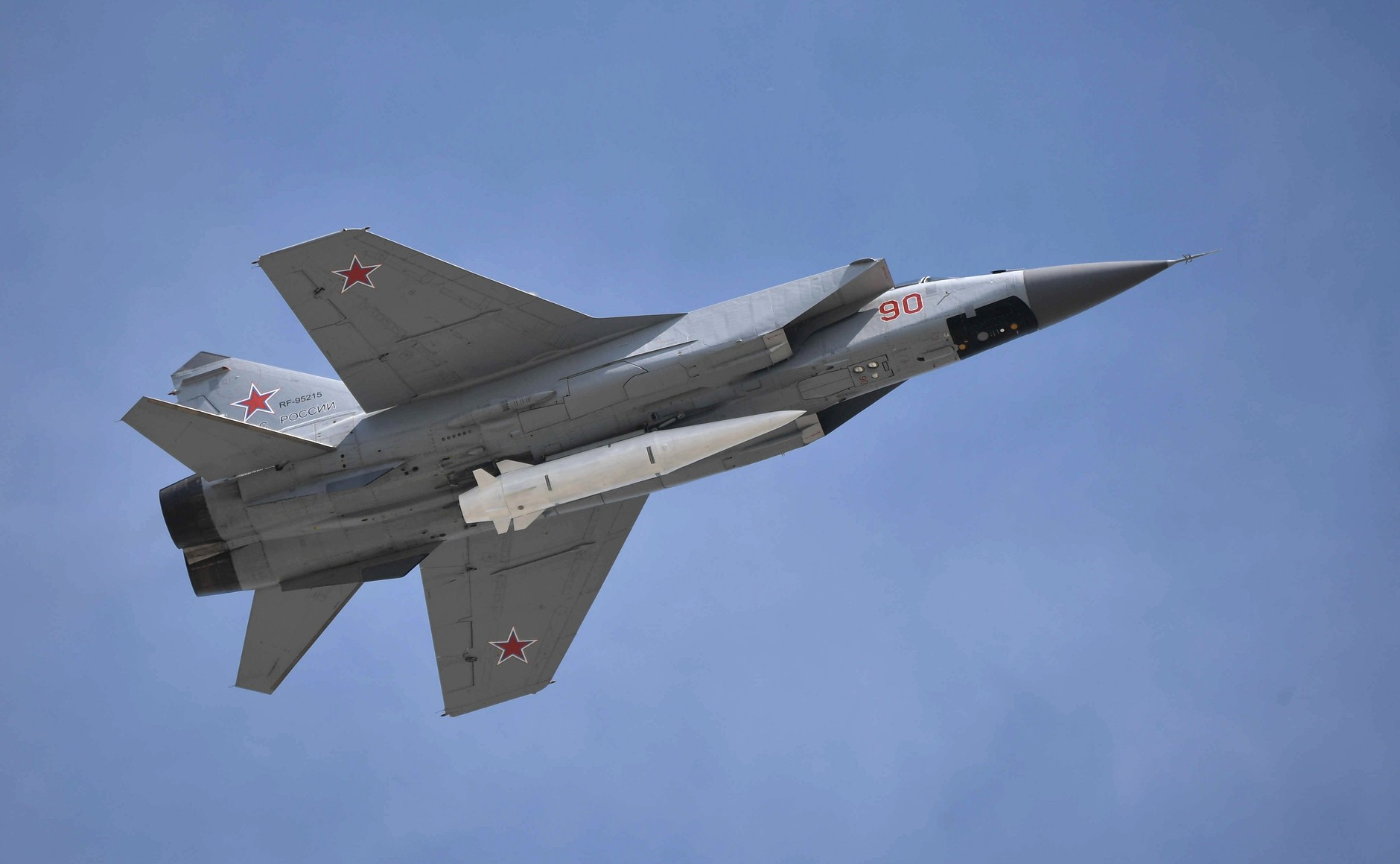
  A Kh-47M2 Kinzhal ALBM being carried by a Mikoyan MiG-31K interceptor

== North America ==
=== United States ===
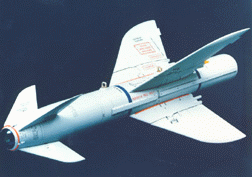
AGM-119 Penguin anti-ship missile.

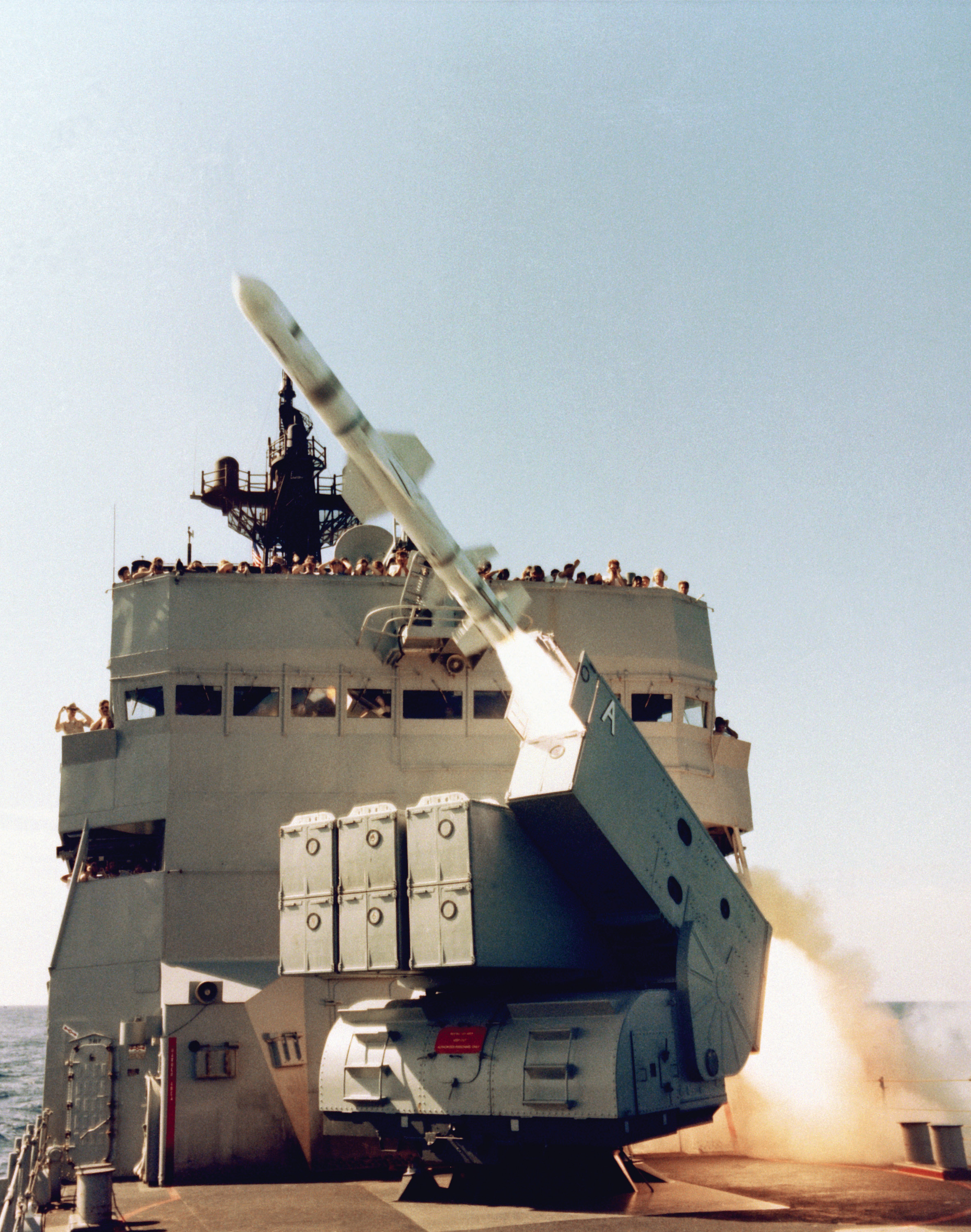
An RGM-84 Harpoon missile is launched from an Mk-16 launcher aboard the Knox class frigate USS Badger (FF-1071).

(All missiles based on radar homing unless otherwise noted.)

- AGM/RGM/UGM-84 Harpoon missile – United States; Made by Boeing/McDonnell Douglas
- AGM-84H/K SLAM-ER (Standoff Land Attack Missile - Expanded Response) – United States; Made by Boeing/McDonnell Douglas
- AGM-123 Skipper – United States; Developed by the U.S. Navy
- BGM-109 Tomahawk (TASM version) & Block Va (Maritime Strike Tomahawk) - United States; Made by Raytheon/General Dynamics
- RIM-67 Standard – U.S., Raytheon (secondary role, SARH, no longer deployed)
- RIM-174 Standard ERAM/SM-6 – U.S., Raytheon (secondary role)
- AGM-158C LRASM Currently under development by Lockheed Martin for DARPA.
- Precision Strike Missile Increment 2 - Joint Australian/American anti-ship ballistic missile

== Oceania ==
=== Australia ===
- Precision Strike Missile Increment 2 - Joint Australian/American anti-ship ballistic missile

== South America ==
=== Argentina ===
- AS-25K
- MP-1000 Martín Pescador

=== Brazil ===
- MANSUP
