= C 14-class missile boat =

Light missile boat of catamaran design

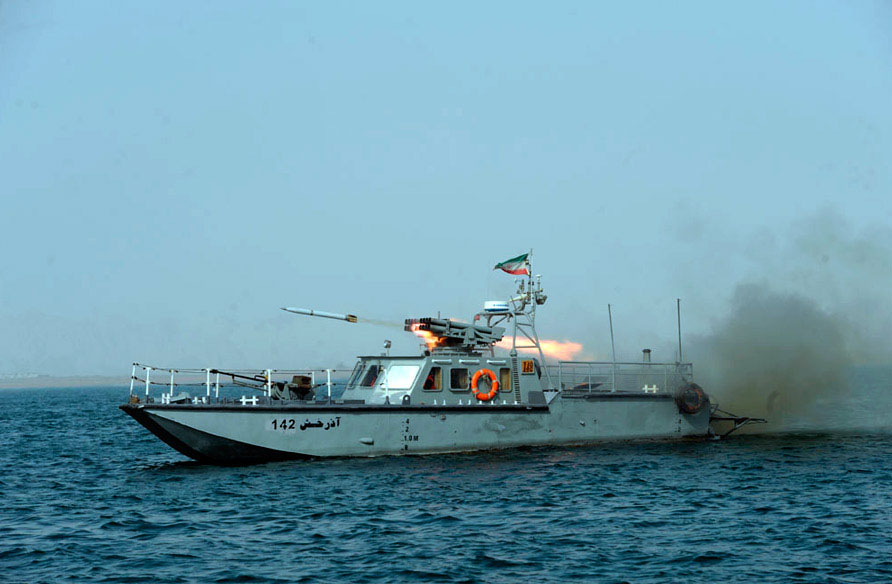
- The Iranian version, named Azarakhsh

Class overview
- Operators: People's Liberation Army Navy; Islamic Republic of Iran Navy
- Succeeded by: Type 022 missile boat
- In commission: Since 2002

General characteristics
- Displacement: 20 tons (fully loaded)
- Length: 23 m (75 ft 6 in)
- Beam: 4 m (13 ft 1 in)
- Height: 3.6 m (11 ft 10 in)
- Draught: 1 m (3 ft 3 in)
- Propulsion: 2 x Isotta V1312 T2 MS diesel engines rated at 880Kw/2700rpm, 2 x ZF Trimax 3200 surface drive with ZF 550 gearbox
- Speed: 50 kn (93 km/h)+
- Range: 300 nmi (560 km)
- Crew: 10
- Sensors & processing systems: Type 351 light surface search radar
- Armament: 4-8 × C-701 / TL-10 / Kowsar or; 2-4 C-704 / Nasr-1; 1 × 12 or 16 round 107mm Rocket Artillery or; 2 × 324mm Torpedo Tubes, 1 × 23mm AAA, 1 × 12.7mm HMG

The C 14-class missile boat is a light missile boat of catamaran designed for use in the Middle East, also known as the China Cat class. The small size of the ship, along with some stealth features provide it with good protection against enemy detection, and it can be armed with a variety of light anti-ship missiles. In addition to the low radar cross section, the boat is also extremely fast with an aluminum monohull with stepped planning.

== Design ==
The catamaran design provides better seaworthiness in comparison to the other boats of similar displacement with a conventional hull. The missile boats have been exported to Iran, where since 2000 it has been in service with the Islamic Revolutionary Guards Navy Corps. In Chinese service, it primarily serves as a trial boat, including testing various light anti-ship missiles and other weaponry for catamarans.

The boats were reportedly first seen in Iran in May 2002, and western sources assumed that a number of these vessels were delivered by China.

== Sources ==
- Global Security
- Iran's Naval Forces
- Combat Fleets 16th Ed.: Iranian Frigates and Patrol Craft
