= Haiying =

Haiying may represent:

- Haiying spacesuit (海鹰号航天服) - a variant of the Orlan-M, see Orlan spacesuit
- Zhang Haiying, an artist
- Wei Haiying, a footballer
- HY-2 Haiying (海鹰) missile ("Sea Eagle" missile), see C-201 Silkworm missile
- China Haiying Electromechanical Technology Academy, manufacturer of the C-802 and C-701
