= Zafar (anti-ship missile) =

Iranian short-range anti-ship cruise missile

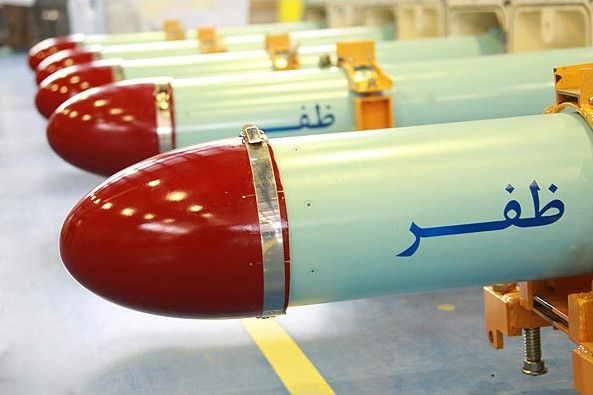
- Zafar ant-ship Missile
- Type: Anti-ship cruise missile
- Place of origin: Iran

Service history
- In service: 2012-present
- Used by: Iranian Navy; Navy of the Revolutionary Guards

Production history
- Manufacturer: Iranian Aviation Industries Organization

Specifications
- Warhead: HE
- Engine: turbojet
- Operational range: 25 km
- Flight altitude: Sea-skimming
- Guidance system: Active radar

Zafar is an Iranian short-range, anti-ship and radar guided cruise missile. It has been designed to be carried inside a launch canister installed on a variety of light vessels and high-speed missile crafts.

The Zafar is claimed to be one of the fastest sea-skimming anti-ship missiles in the Iranian arsenal. The Defense Ministry developed the missile.

== History ==
In response to the United States arms embargo of 1992, Iran turned towards domestically engineered and produced weapon systems. The Zafar (Triumph) cruise missile is one of the missile developed.

It had its first successful test fire in April 2011. It started production and was revealed to be in active duty in February 2012.

== Features ==
It has an active radar homing system and maximum range of 25 km. It is built for an active electronic warfare environment. The Zafar missile's design makes it very difficult to be jammed by electronic warfare techniques. It has an active radar guided-missile equipped with a torpedo warhead.

It is placed in box canisters which may be mounted on shore-based missile launchers or the small, high speed craft used by the navy of Iran. Zafar missiles is preferred for the smaller platforms, such as C14M Azarakhsh and Zolfaghar. Iran has also developed a helicopter, Shahed 285, which has ability to carry two Zafar missiles.

The Zafar is likely based on Chinese C-701R or C-704 and C-705.
