= TL-6 =

- Type: anti-ship / air-to-surface missiles
- Place of origin: China

Service history
- In service: Prior to 2006 – present
- Used by: China

Production history
- Manufacturer: Hongdu Aviation Industry Corporation
- Produced: Prior to 2006

Specifications
- Mass: 350 kg (770 lb)
- Length: 3.4–3.5 m (11–11 ft)
- Diameter: 28 cm (11 in)
- Wingspan: 900 m (35,000 in)
- Warhead: 30 kg (66 lb) warhead
- Detonation mechanism: Semi-armor-piercing
- Engine: Rocket motor
- Propellant: Solid fuel
- Operational range: 35 km (19 nmi)
- Flight altitude: 12 m (39 ft) (cruising)
- Maximum speed: Mach 0.8 – 0.9
- Guidance system: ARH / ImIR IR / TV
- Launch platform: Air & surface

The TL-6 (Chinese: 天龙-6; lit. 'Sky Dragon') is an anti-ship missile developed by Hongdu Aviation Industry Group. The missile was marketed via China National Aero-Technology Import & Export Corporation (CATIC) as FL-9 (Chinese: 飞龙-9; lit. 'Flying Dragon').

== Development ==
During the Falkland War, the Royal Air Force (RAF) used Westland Lynx to launch Sea Skua anti-ship missiles against Argentinian patrol boats. Helicopter-based anti-surface operation was seen as a viable option in any potential Taiwan Strait operation by the Chinese military industry. In the 1990s, China Aerospace Science and Industry Corporation (CASIC) Third Academy and Hongdu Aviation Industry Group (Hongdu) both initiated small anti-ship missile projects, resulting in CASIC's C-701 missile and Hongdu's TL-10 missile. Both missiles shared very similar specifications, but with a slight deviation in launch profile. The initial model of the C-701 focused on surface launch from boats, while TL-10 focused on helicopter air-launch integration.

Hongdu Aviation Industry Corporation (Hongdu) began the development of TL-6 and TL-10 missiles in the mid-1990s, and conducted test fires in the same period. According to a representative of Hongdu in 2004, the TL-6 and TL-10 programs were purely designed for export, and no missiles would be inducted into the People's Liberation Army. Three missile variants were showcased, including the air-to-surface KJ/TL-10B, the surface-to-surface JJ/TL-10A, and the surface-to-surface JJ/TL-6B. TL-6 was tested for fire by both surface systems and aircraft. TL-6B also had a radar-guided version under development. The TL-6 missile was showcased at Zhuhai Airshow 2004.

Jane's Defence Weekly suspected that the reason behind the similar roles, dimensions, and performance of the C-701 and TL-10 was that they were part of a competition bid intended for Iran's Kowsar missile program. Sources conflict regarding which missile variant ultimately entered service with the Iranian military; one account states that the TL-10/FL-8 and TL-6/FL-9 became the Kowsar and Nasar missiles, while another suggests that the C-701 and C-704 were the ones developed into these two systems.

== Variants ==
TL-6
Original variant
FL-9
Alternative name for the TL-6.
TL-2
Rebranded TL-6, showcased at Zhuhai Airshow 2008.

== Specifications ==
Missile specifications of Tianlong (TL) and C-701/C-704 series
	TL-10	C-701	TL-6	C-704
Manufacturer	Hongdu	CASIC	Hongdu	CASIC
Launch mass	105 kg (231 lb)	117 kg (258 lb)	350 kg (770 lb)	360 kg (790 lb)
Warhead	30 kg (66 lb) semi-armor piercing (SAP)	29–30 kg (64–66 lb) SAP	130 kg (290 lb)	130 kg (290 lb) SAP
Length	2.5 m (8.2 ft)	2.685 m (8.81 ft)	3.4–3.5 m (11–11 ft)	3.284 m (10.77 ft)
Diameter	18 cm (7.1 in)	18 cm (7.1 in)	28 cm (11 in)	28 cm (11 in)
Span	568 mm (22.4 in)	586 mm (23.1 in)	900 mm (35 in)	480–1,018 mm (18.9–40.1 in)
Range	25 km (13 nmi)	25 km (13 nmi)	35 km (19 nmi)	38 km (21 nmi)
Seeker	TV / Active radar / imaging infrared			
Motor	Dual thrust / dual chamber solid rocket			
Speed	Mach 0.85	Mach 0.85	Mach 0.9	Mach 0.8

== Operators ==
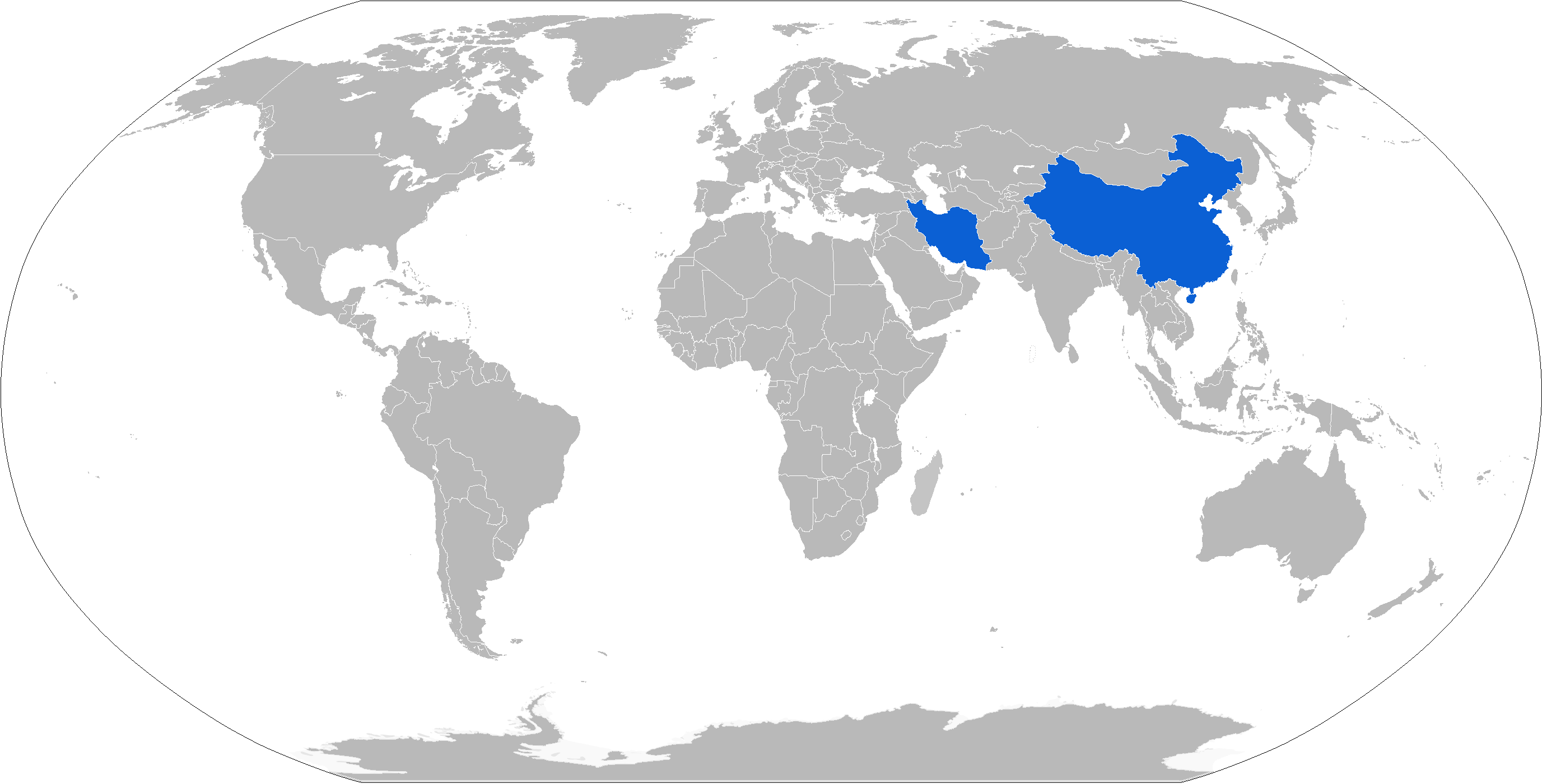
Map with TL-6 operators in blue

=== Current operators ===
- Iran: Islamic Republic of Iran
- China: People's Republic of China

== See also ==
- TL-10 - a smaller anti-ship missile in the TL series
- C-704 - the competitor to the TL-6 missile
- AGM-65 Maverick
- AGM-119
- Kh-25
