= FL 7 =

FL 7 or FL-7 can refer to:

- FL-7 rocket
- Florida's 7th congressional district
- Florida State Road 7
