= Fighting Shark No.1 =

Ship

History

PRC

General characteristics
- Type: Technological research ship
- Propulsion: Marine Diesel
- Sensors & processing systems: Various
- Electronic warfare & decoys: Various
- Armament: None
- Armour: None
- Aircraft carried: UAVs
- Aviation facilities: Flight deck

Fight Shark No. 1 (Bo-Sha-Yi-Hao, 搏鲨1号) is a little known Chinese UAV mother ship built in the People’s Republic of China (PRC) for the People's Liberation Army Navy (PLAN).

Designed by Nanjing Long Peak Aerospace Electronic Science and Technology Corporation (南京长峰航天电子科技有限公司), a subsidiary of China Aerospace Science and Industry Corporation (CASIC), the ship was first revealed during the 13th Zhuhai Airshow in 2021,after launched in May of the same year. The ship is a catamaran design, with helipad on the foredeck in front of the superstructure, with five spots on the helipad to accommodate a total of five unmanned helicopters. Multiple large antenna radomes mounted atop of the superstructure is presumably to house high-band width communication systems to control large numbers of UAVs.According to the information released by the developer at the Zhuhai Airshow, the ship is capable of simulating hostile drone swarms, high-volume anti-ship missile strikes, and electronic warfare attacks.

Type	NATO designation	Pennant No.	Name (English)	Name (Han 中文)	Commissioned	Displacement	Fleet	Status
Type not yet publicized	?	Bo-Sha No.1	Fighting Shark No. 1	搏鲨1号	2021	? t	All fleets	Active
