= FL-7 =

- Type: anti-ship, and air-to-surface missiles
- Place of origin: China

Service history
- In service: late 1980s–present
- Used by: China

Production history
- Manufacturer: Hongdu Aviation Industry Corporation
- Produced: 1980s–1990s

Specifications
- Mass: 1.77 ton
- Length: 6.59 meter
- Diameter: 0.54 meter
- Wingspan: 1.86 meter
- Warhead: 360 kg warhead
- Detonation mechanism: Semi-armor-piercing
- Engine: rocket motor
- Propellant: liquid fuel
- Operational range: 32 km
- Flight altitude: 5 to 50 cruising
- Maximum speed: Mach 1.4
- Guidance system: ARH
- Launch platform: Air & ground

The FL-7 (Chinese: 飞龙-7) is the export version of the SY-2 missile, specifically the liquid propellant prototype of SY-2. The export variant of the solid propellant SY-2 is known as the FL-2.

== Development ==
In addition to developing the C-101 and C-301 supersonic anti-ship missiles which are fairly large in size, China has developed FL-7 (FL: Fei Long, meaning Flying Dragon) supersonic anti-ship missile which can be carried on airplanes and warships. The Feilong-7 has an effective range of 32 kilometers and a speed of Mach 1.4. It has powerful anti-jamming capability and its supersonic flight makes terminal interception difficult. The warhead of the FL-7 can pierce solid armor and destroy large and medium-sized surface warships. This missile can be roughly considered as the supersonic counterpart of the subsonic C-704 anti-ship missile. The missile is powered by a liquid fuel rocket motor and a solid rocket booster, which is under the airframe at the rear.

Along with C-101, FL-7 competed for the air-launched supersonic anti-ship missile program in China during the 1990s. However, C-101 was selected because it flies at faster speed and its range is nearly a third greater than that of FL-7, while it only weighs slightly heavier. Being the last Chinese anti-ship missile with rocket motor powered by liquid fuel, the role of FL-7 is decreasing, but not yet immediately phased out. The reason is that the Chinese coastal defense doctrine when using anti-ship missiles: multi-direction, multi-altitude, multiple waves attacks on targets with both supersonic and subsonic anti-ship missiles to make it difficult for the targets to defend itself from such saturated attacks, FL-7 is thus still have a little role to play in such saturated attacks at shorter range. However, it is safe to conclude that as newer missiles becoming widely available, the role of FL-7 would continuously decrease to its eventual retirement.

Western sources have claimed in 1996, with Chinese help in the forms of technology sales, that Iran had begun indigenous production of a medium-range anti-ship missile, based on the technologies of FL-7.

== Specifications ==
- Length: 6.59 m
- Diameter: 0.54 m
- Weight: 1,770 kg
- Wingspan: 1.86 m
- Warhead: 360 kg
- Speed: > Mach 1.4
- Range: 32 km max.
- Guidance: active radar homing seeker (Other types of seekers being developed)
- Propulsion: one liquid rocket engine with a solid rocket booster
