= TL-10 =

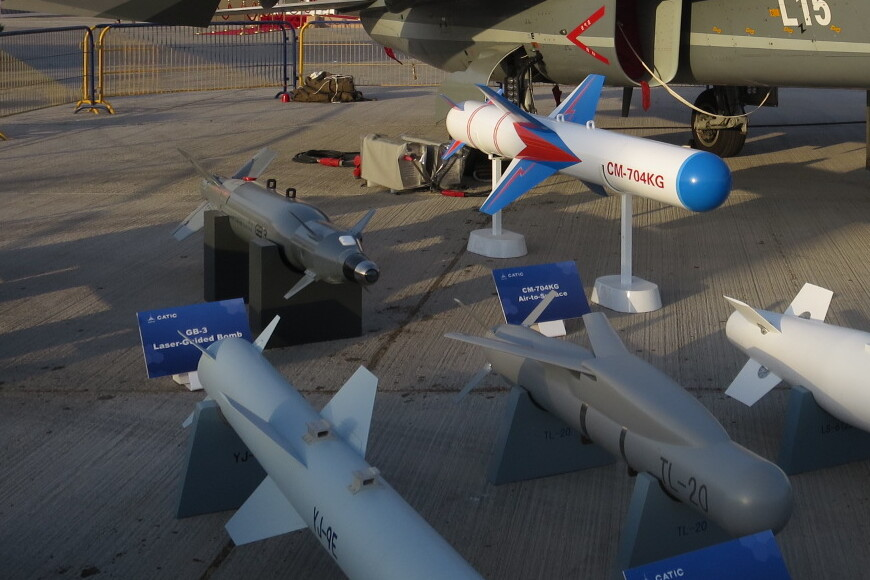
- YJ-9E anti-ship missile (bottom-left) in a display of Hongdu L-15 aircraft
- Type: anti-ship / air-to-surface missiles
- Place of origin: China

Service history
- In service: prior to 2006 – present
- Used by: China

Production history
- Manufacturer: Hongdu Aviation Industry Corporation
- Produced: prior to 2006

Specifications
- Mass: 105 kg (231 lb)
- Length: 2,500 mm (98 in)
- Diameter: 180 mm (7.1 in)
- Wingspan: 568 mm (22.4 in)
- Warhead: 30 kg (66 lb)
- Detonation mechanism: Semi-armor-piercing
- Engine: rocket motor
- Propellant: dual thrust chamber, solid rocket motor
- Operational range: 4–25 km (2.5–15.5 mi)
- Maximum speed: ≈ Mach 0.85
- Guidance system: INS, active radar homing (ARH), imaging infrared (IIR), TV/CCD, semi-active laser (SAL)
- Launch platform: Air & surface

The YJ-9 (Chinese: 鹰击-9; pinyin: yingji-9; lit. 'Eagle Strike 9') is a Chinese lightweight anti-ship missile manufactured by Hongdu Aviation Industry Corporation. The export version of YJ-9 is called TL-10 (Chinese: 天龙-10; lit. 'Sky Dragon-10') anti-ship missile by Hongdu, or FL-8 (lit. 'Flying Dragon-8') by China National Aero-Technology Import & Export Corporation (CATIC). The missile was part of a bidding competition against C-701 missile for Iranian Kowsar missile program.

== Development ==
During the Falkland War, the Royal Air Force (RAF) used Westland Lynx to launch Sea Skua anti-ship missiles against Argentinian patrol boats. Helicopter-based anti-surface operation was seen as a viable option in any potential Taiwan Strait operation by the Chinese military industry. In the 1990s, China Aerospace Science and Industry Corporation (CASIC) Third Academy and Hongdu Aviation Industry Group (Hongdu) both initiated small anti-ship missile projects, resulting in CASIC's C-701 missile and Hongdu's TL-10 missile. Both missiles shared very similar specifications, but with a slight deviation in launch profile. The initial model of the C-701 focused on surface launch from boats, while TL-10 focused on helicopter air-launch integration.

Hongdu Aviation Industry Corporation began the development of TL-10 and TL-6 missiles in the mid-1990s, and conducted test fires in the same period. The TL-10 was unveiled in the 2004 Zhuhai Airshow. According to a representative of Hongdu in 2004, the TL-6 and TL-10 programs were purely designed for export, and no missiles would be inducted into the People's Liberation Army. Three missile variants were showcased in 2004: the air-to-surface KJ/TL-10B, the surface-to-surface JJ/TL-10A, and the surface-to-surface JJ/TL-6B. TL-6B also had a radar-guided version under development.

Jane's Defence Weekly suspected that the reason behind the similar roles, dimensions, and performance of the C-701 and TL-10 was that they were part of a competition bid intended for Iran's Kowsar missile program. Sources conflict regarding which missile variant ultimately entered service with the Iranian military; one account states that the TL-10/FL-8 and TL-6/FL-9 became the Kowsar and Nasar missiles, while another suggests that the C-701 and C-704 were the ones developed into these two systems.

The domestic variant of the TL-10, named YJ-9, first appeared in Chinese media reports in 2013. Four YJ-9 missiles can be carried by a PLA Navy Harbin Z-9D helicopter. In 2025, YJ-9s were carried by Harbin Z-20F helicopters on Chinese ships.

== Design ==
The YJ-9 (TL-10) is a lightweight anti-ship missile designed to engage small targets at sea. The TL-10 is armed with a television seeker, but can be modified to carry other guidance methods.

== Variants ==
TL-10A
TV/CCD version.
TL-10B
Active radar version.
FL-8
Alternaive name for TL-10.
TL-1
Rebranded TL-10, showcased at Zhuhai Airshow 2008.
YJ-9
Active radar version for People's Liberation Army usage. The missile's length is extended for additional range.

== Specifications ==
Missile specifications of Tianlong (TL) and C-701/C-704 series
	YJ-9	TL-10	C-701	TL-6	C-704
Manufacturer	Hongdu	Hongdu	CASIC	Hongdu	CASIC
Launch mass	120 kg (260 lb)	105 kg (231 lb)	117 kg (258 lb)	350 kg (770 lb)	360 kg (790 lb)
Warhead		30 kg (66 lb) semi-armor piercing (SAP)	29–30 kg (64–66 lb) SAP	130 kg (290 lb)	130 kg (290 lb) SAP
Length	2.7 m (8.9 ft)	2.5 m (8.2 ft)	2.685 m (8.81 ft)	3.4–3.5 m (11–11 ft)	3.284 m (10.77 ft)
Diameter	18 cm (7.1 in)	18 cm (7.1 in)	18 cm (7.1 in)	28 cm (11 in)	28 cm (11 in)
Span	568 mm (22.4 in)	568 mm (22.4 in)	586 mm (23.1 in)	900 mm (35 in)	480–1,018 mm (18.9–40.1 in)
Range	50–60 km (27–32 nmi)	25 km (13 nmi)	25 km (13 nmi)	35 km (19 nmi)	38 km (21 nmi)
Seeker	TV / Active radar / imaging infrared				
Motor	Dual thrust / dual chamber solid rocket				
Speed		Mach 0.85	Mach 0.85	Mach 0.9	Mach 0.8

== Operators ==
=== Current operators ===
- Iran: Islamic Republic of Iran
- China: People's Republic of China: YJ-9

== See also ==
- TL-6 - a larger anti-ship missile in the TL series
- C-701 - competitor to the TL-10
- Sea Skua
