= C-101 =

- Type: anti-ship, and air to surface cruise missile
- Place of origin: China

Service history
- Used by: China

Production history
- Manufacturer: China Aerospace Science and Industry Corporation

Specifications
- Mass: 1.85 t (ship launched); 1.5 t (air-launched)
- Length: 6.5 m (ship launched); 7.5 m (air-launched)
- Diameter: 0.54 m
- Wingspan: 1.62 m
- Warhead: 300 kg warhead
- Detonation mechanism: Semi-armor-piercing
- Engine: Ramjet
- Propellant: Kerosene
- Operational range: 50 km
- Flight altitude: 50 m (cruising); 5 m (terminal)
- Maximum speed: Mach 2
- Guidance system: Radar
- Launch platform: Air, surface

The C-101 is a Chinese supersonic anti-ship cruise missile. It is manufactured by the China Aerospace Science and Industry Corporation Third Academy.

== Development ==
The C-101 was an early Chinese supersonic cruise missile. It has been described as unsuccessful.

The People's Liberation Army Navy designation is YJ-1 (Chinese: 鹰击-1; pinyin: yingji-1; lit. 'eagle strike 1'; NATO reporting name: CSS-X-5).

== Design ==
The C-101 is launched with solid-fuel rocket boosters to a speed of Mach 1.8. Two ramjets sustain a cruise and impact speed of Mach 2. At three kilometers from the target, the missile descends from a cruise altitude of 50 meters to 5 meters.

== See also ==
- HY-2
