= CM-102 =

Chinese anti-radiation missile

The CM-102 is an anti-radiation missile produced by the China Aerospace Science and Industry Corporation (CASIC) for the Chinese People's Liberation Army. The missile was revealed by CASIC in 2018 and observed mounted on the Shenyang J-11B fighter aircraft in 2020. The missile can be mounted on fighter aircraft, attack aircraft, and unmanned aerial vehicles. It can target search, targeting, and tracking radar of the air defense systems. It has a range of 100 km (62 mi) and a warhead mass of 80 kg (180 lb).

The CM-103 is an enlarged version of the CM-102 for both anti-ship and land attack missions. CM-103 can be launched from air, surface, and naval platforms, and the missile is multi-purpose, which can target ground targets, naval ships, and air defense systems. The missile shares its steering mechanism with the CM-102, including side strakes and all-moving trailing edges. It has a dimension similar to that of CM-802, supporting more fuel for a range of 290 km (180 mi) and a much larger warhead.
