= YJ-7 =

YJ-7 (C-701)
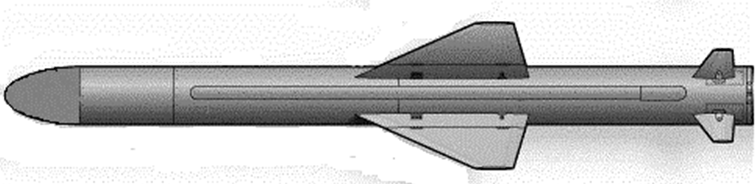
- Type: anti-ship missile
- Place of origin: People's Republic of China

Production history
- Manufacturer: China Aerospace Science and Industry Corporation (CASIC) Third Academy

Specifications
- Mass: 117 kg (258 lb)
- Length: 2,500 mm (8.2 ft)
- Diameter: 180 mm (7.1 in)
- Wingspan: 450 mm (18 in) (folded); 587 mm (23.1 in) (expanded)
- Warhead: 30.5 kg (67 lb) semi armour-piercing high explosive
- Engine: Rocket engine
- Operational range: 15 km (9.3 mi; 8.1 nmi), 25 km (16 mi; 13 nmi) when launched by fixed-wing aircraft
- Flight altitude: 13–20 m (43–66 ft)
- Maximum speed: Mach 0.8
- Guidance system: Active radar, TV/CCD electro-optical, semi-active laser homing (SAL), infrared homing (IR), image infrared homing (IIR), and millimeter wave radar (mmW)
- Launch platform: Air & surface

The YJ-7 (Chinese: 鹰击-7; pinyin: yingji-7; lit. 'Eagle Strike 7') is a Chinese subsonic anti-ship missile. It is manufactured by the Third Academy of the China Aerospace Science and Industry Corporation (CASIC). The export version of the YJ-7 is the C-701.

== History ==
During the Falkland War, the Royal Air Force (RAF) used Westland Lynx to launch Sea Skua anti-ship missiles against Argentinian patrol boats. Helicopter-based anti-surface operation was seen as a viable option in any potential Taiwan Strait operation by the Chinese military industry. In the 1990s, China Aerospace Science and Industry Corporation (CASIC) Third Academy and Hongdu Aviation Industry Group (Hongdu) both initiated small anti-ship missile projects, resulting in CASIC's C-701 missile and Hongdu's TL-10 missile. Both missiles shared very similar specifications, but with a slight deviation in launch profile. The initial model of the C-701 focused on surface launch from boats, while TL-10 focused on helicopter air-launch integration.

The C-701 was first unveiled at Zhuhai Airshow 1996, featuring the first-generation TV seeker built in China.

The radar-guided C-701 was displayed by the China Precision Machinery Import-Export Corporation (CPMIEC) at the 2004 China International Aviation & Aerospace Exhibition. Although the missile was developed by the China Aerospace Science and Industry Corporation, Iran's Aerospace Industries Organisation (AIO) claimed presented the missile as a national program. In April 2006, it was reported that radar-guided C-701s were fired during Iranian military exercises.

Jane's Defence Weekly suspected that the reason behind the similar roles, dimensions, and performance of the C-701 and TL-10 was that they were part of a competition bid intended for Iran's Kowsar missile program. Sources conflict regarding which missile variant ultimately entered service with the Iranian military; one account states that the TL-10/FL-8 and TL-6/FL-9 became the Kowsar and Nasar missiles, while another suggests that the C-701 and C-704 were the ones developed into these two systems.

The missile is sometimes called YJ-7. The YJ-7 missile features a modular seeker, such as TV/CCD, semi-active laser homing, infrared homing (IR), image infrared homing (IIR), and millimeter wave radar (mmW) homing. The seeker can combine multiple tracking modes. The C-701 was not accepted into Chinese military service.

== Specifications ==
Missile specifications of Tianlong (TL) and C-701/C-704 series
	TL-10	C-701	TL-6	C-704
Manufacturer	Hongdu	CASIC	Hongdu	CASIC
Launch mass	105 kg (231 lb)	117 kg (258 lb)	350 kg (770 lb)	360 kg (790 lb)
Warhead	30 kg (66 lb) semi-armor piercing (SAP)	29–30 kg (64–66 lb) SAP	130 kg (290 lb)	130 kg (290 lb) SAP
Length	2.5 m (8.2 ft)	2.685 m (8.81 ft)	3.4–3.5 m (11–11 ft)	3.284 m (10.77 ft)
Diameter	18 cm (7.1 in)	18 cm (7.1 in)	28 cm (11 in)	28 cm (11 in)
Span	568 mm (22.4 in)	586 mm (23.1 in)	900 mm (35 in)	480–1,018 mm (18.9–40.1 in)
Range	25 km (13 nmi)	25 km (13 nmi)	35 km (19 nmi)	38 km (21 nmi)
Seeker	TV / Active radar / imaging infrared			
Motor	Dual thrust / dual chamber solid rocket			
Speed	Mach 0.85	Mach 0.85	Mach 0.9	Mach 0.8

== Variants ==
- YJ-7
- C-701 AR: Export version with active radar seeker
- C-701T: Export version with electro-optical seeker
- FL-10: "Cheaper version" of the C-701
- Kowsar: Iranian version of C-701

== Operators ==
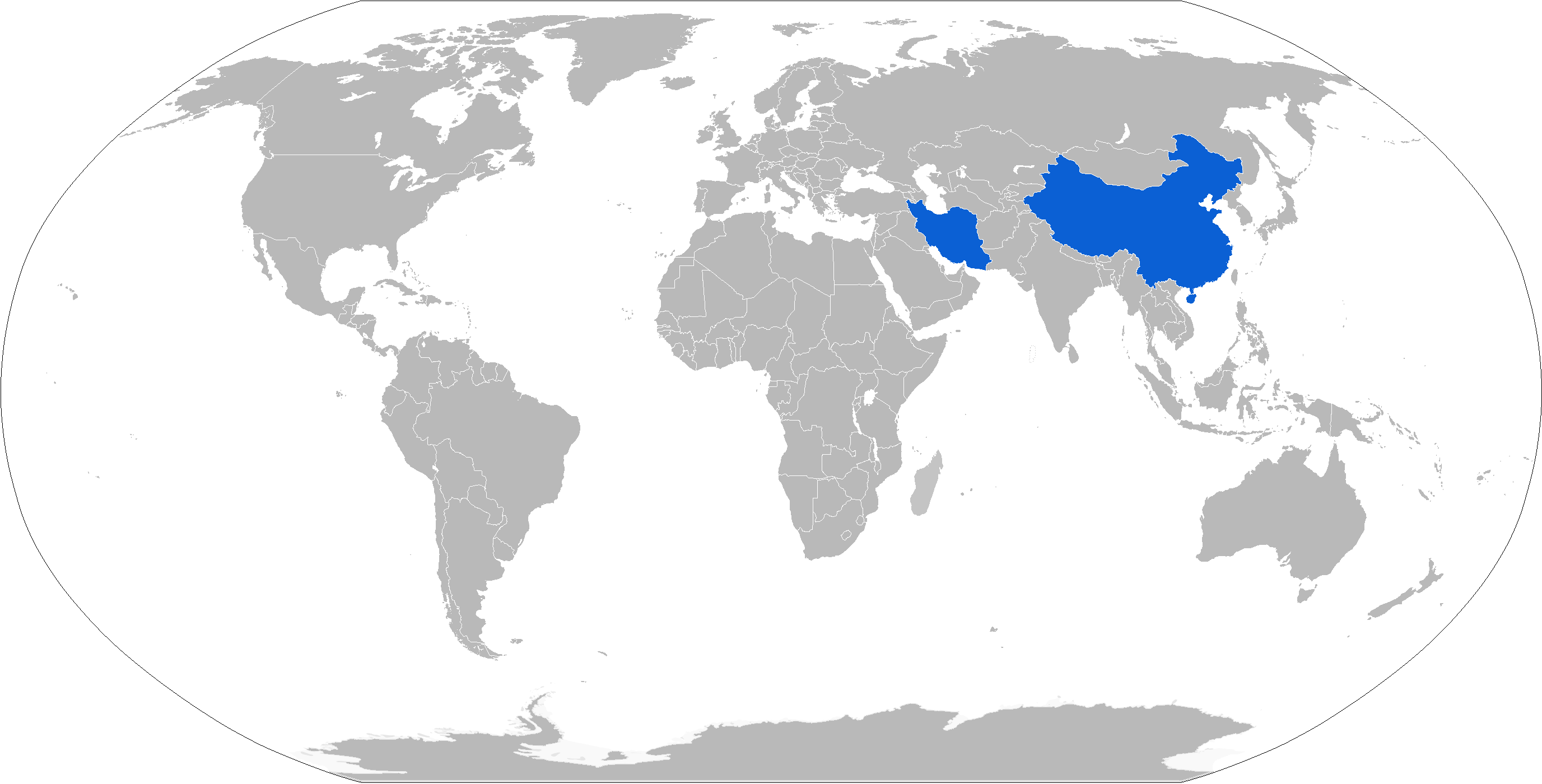
Map with C-701 operators in blue

=== Current operators ===
Iran

- Armed Forces of the Islamic Republic of Iran: C-701, Kowsar (patrol boats, shore batteries.)
- Islamic Revolutionary Guard Corps Navy: C-701, C-704, C-705.

China

- People's Liberation Army Navy: Dennis M. Gormley claimed the C-701 was designated as YJ-7 and fitted on the Harbin Z-8 and Z-9C helicopters. Chinese source claims the C-701 with TV seeker was not accepted into Chinese military service.

== See also ==
- C-704 - a larger anti-ship missile in the C-70X series
- YJ-9 - competitor to the C-701
- Sea Skua
