= Silkworm (missile) =

Series of Chinese anti-ship missiles

SY/HY missiles
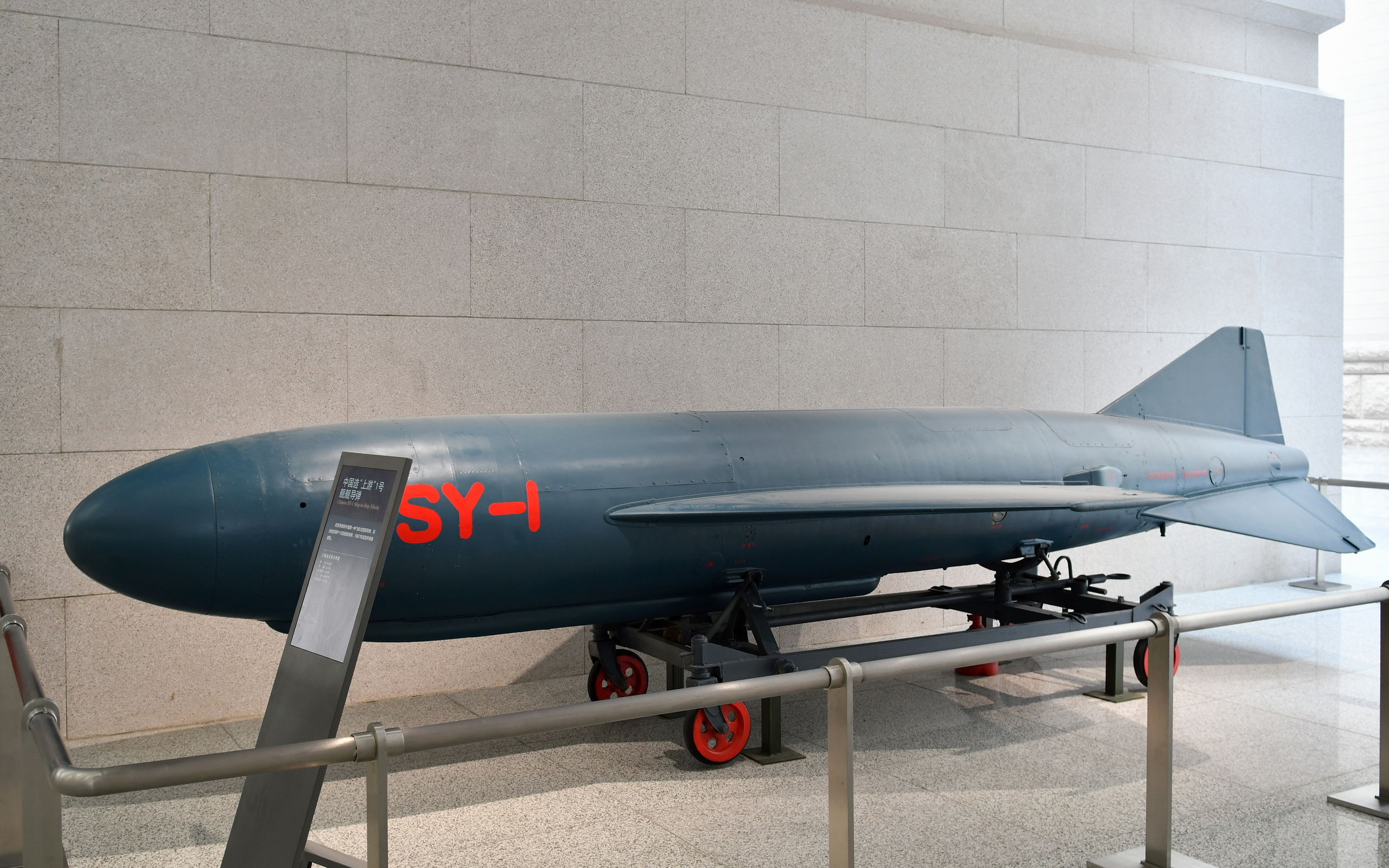
- SY-1 missile
- Type: Anti-ship cruise missile
- Place of origin: China

Production history
- Manufacturer: Nanchang Aircraft Manufacturing Company (Now Hongdu); China Aerospace Science and Industry Corporation Third Academy

The SY (Chinese: 上游; pinyin: Shàngyóu; lit. 'Upstream'), and HY (Chinese: 海鹰; pinyin: Hǎiyīng; lit. 'Sea Eagle') series were early anti-ship cruise missiles (ASCM) developed by the People's Republic of China from the Soviet P-15 Termit missile. They entered service in the late 1960s and remained the main ASCMs deployed by the People's Liberation Army Navy through the 1980s. The missiles were used by the PRC and export customers to develop land attack cruise missiles (LACM).

The name Silkworm is popularly used for the entire SY and HY family. As a NATO reporting name, it applies only to the land-based variant of the HY-1.

== Development ==
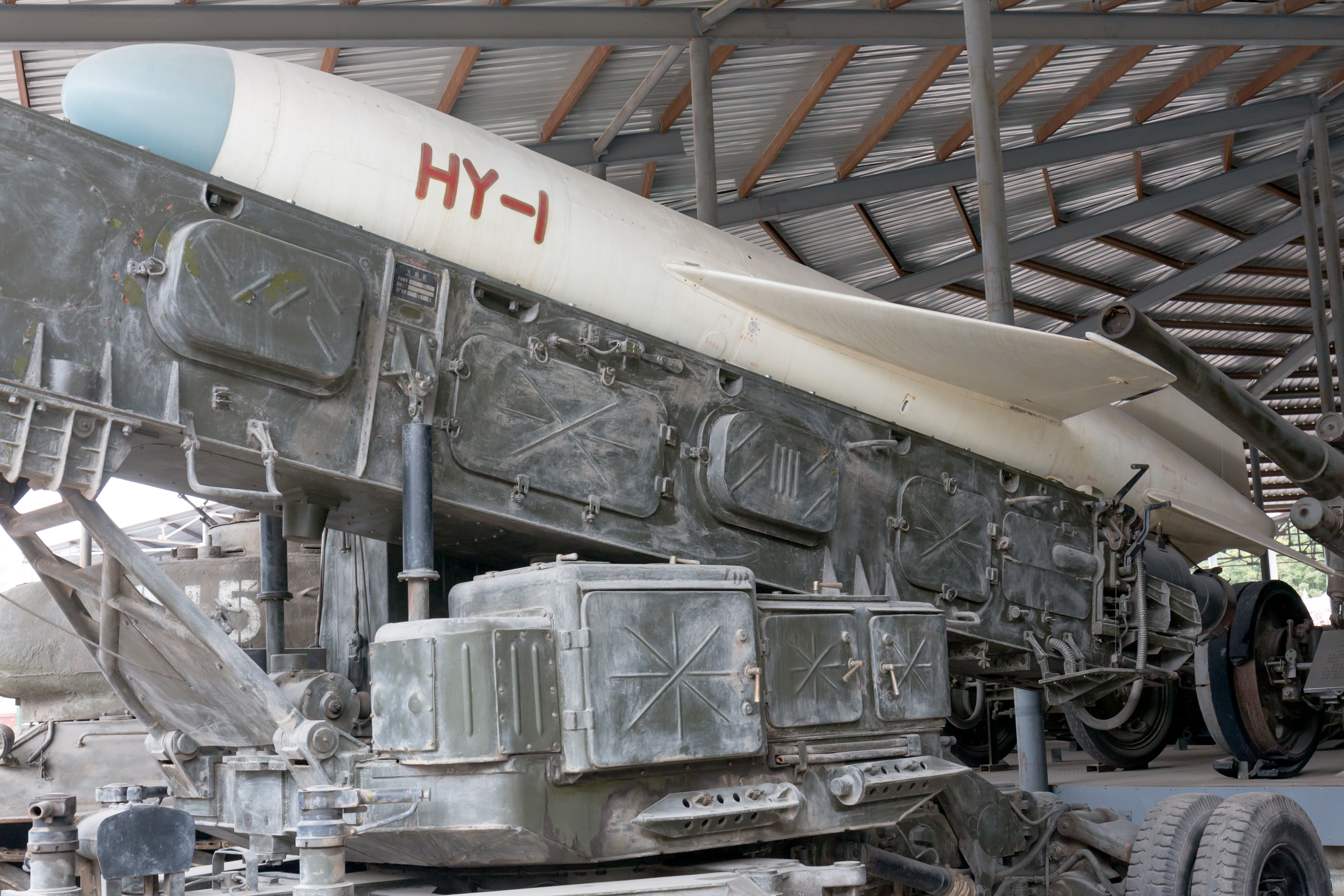
HY-1 missile on its land-based launcher

Chinese preparations were underway before receiving the first P-15s and related technical data from the Soviets in 1959. On 8 October 1956, the Fifth Academy was founded - with Qian Xuesen as director - to pursue missile development. In March 1958 a cruise missile test site was selected at Liaoxi in Liaoning.

In November 1960, the first successful missile test was conducted after the withdrawal of Soviet advisors in September, due to the Sino-Soviet split. The P-15 was copied to become the SY-1. In October 1963, production started at the Nanchang Aircraft Manufacturing Company. In 1965, the first successful test occurred. In August 1967, production was approved. The SY-1 entered service by the end of the decade.

The SY-1 was developed into the improved HY-1. In December 1968, the HY-1 was successfully tested, and entered service in 1974.

== Operational history ==
=== Iran–Iraq War ===
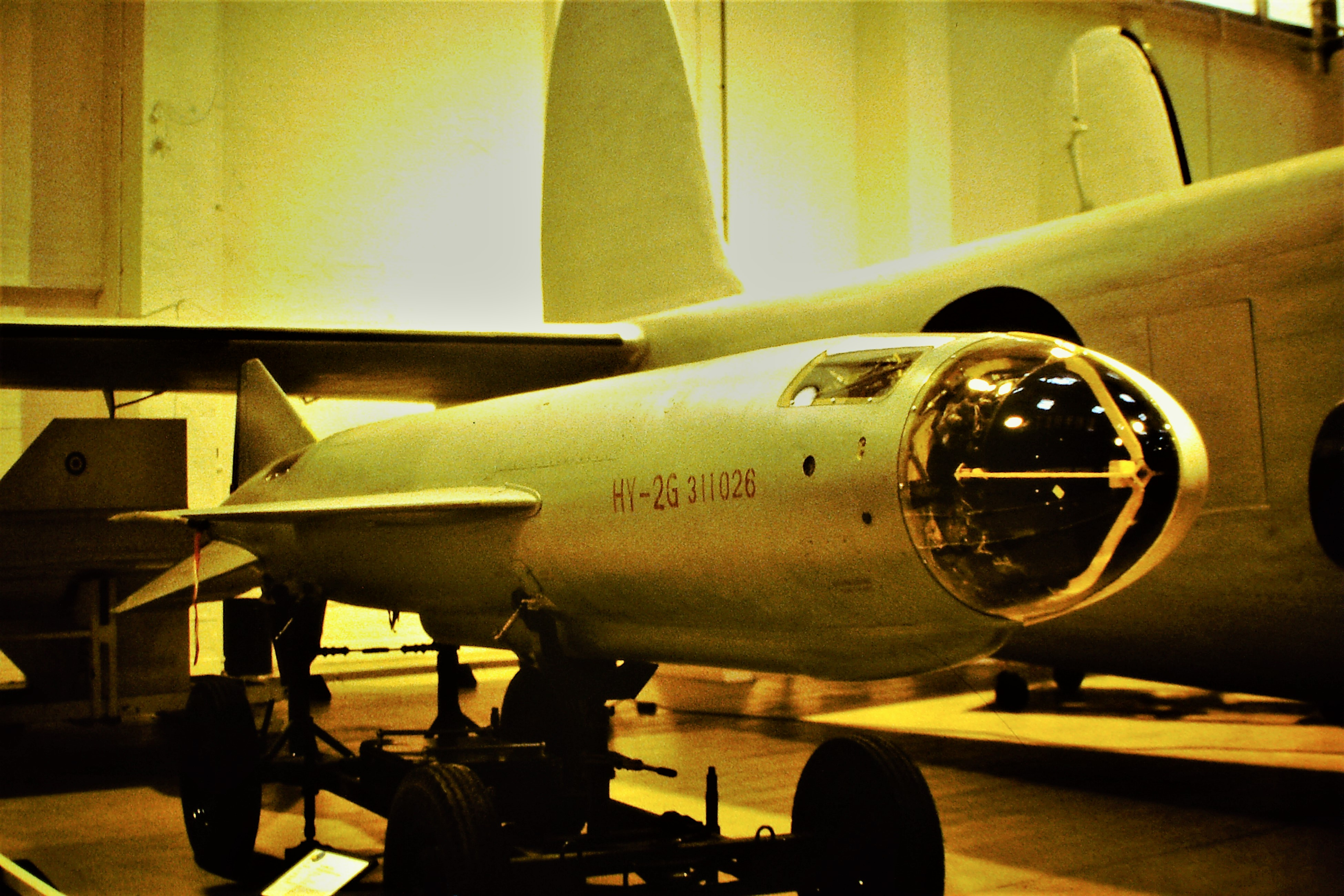
Iraqi HY-2 captured by Coalition force in the Gulf War

The Silkworm gained fame in the 1980s when it was used by both sides in the Iran–Iraq War. Both countries were supplied by China. In 1987, Iran launched a number of Silkworm missiles from the Faw Peninsula, striking the American-owned, Liberian-flagged tanker Sungari and the U.S.-flagged tanker Sea Isle City in October 1987. Five other missiles struck areas in Kuwait earlier in the year.

In October 1987, Kuwait's Sea Island offshore oil terminal was hit by an Iranian Silkworm, which was observed to have originated from the Faw peninsula. The attack prompted Kuwait to deploy a Hawk missile battery on Failaka Island to protect the terminal. In December 1987, another Iranian Silkworm was fired at the terminal, but it struck a decoy barge instead.

Prior to these attacks the missile's range was thought to be less than 80 kilometres (50 mi), but these attacks proved that the range exceeded 100 kilometres (62 mi) with Kuwaiti military observers seeing that the missiles originated from the area and tracking them on radar along with US satellite imagery of the launch sites.

=== Gulf War ===
On February 25, 1991 during Operation Desert Storm, a shore-based Iraqi launcher fired two Silkworm missiles at the USS Missouri which was in company with the USS Jarrett and HMS Gloucester. A Sea Dart missile from HMS Gloucester shot down one Silkworm and the other missed, crashing into the ocean. Royal Air Force officers subsequently recovered an HY-2 missile at Umm Qasr in southern Iraq. It is currently displayed at the Royal Air Force Museum Midlands.

=== Iraq War ===
During the 2003 invasion of Iraq, Iraq used the Silkworm (HY-2 Seersucker) as a surface to surface missile, by firing at least two of them at the coalition positions in Kuwait.

=== Blockade of Yemen ===
On 12 October 2016, during the Blockade of Yemen, two Silkworm missiles were fired from the Houthi-controlled port of Al Hudaydah at the destroyer USS Mason operating in the Bab el-Mandeb strait. Both impacted the sea, possibly due to the countermeasures.

=== Lebanon War ===
Hezbollah forces used anti-ship missiles, including Iranian-modified versions of Chinese designs, to target Israeli vessels during the 2006 Lebanon War. The most notable incident occurred on July 14, 2006, when a C-802 missile (related to the Silkworm/Styx family) struck the INS Hanit off the coast of Lebanon, causing damage and casualties.

== Variants ==
=== SY series ===
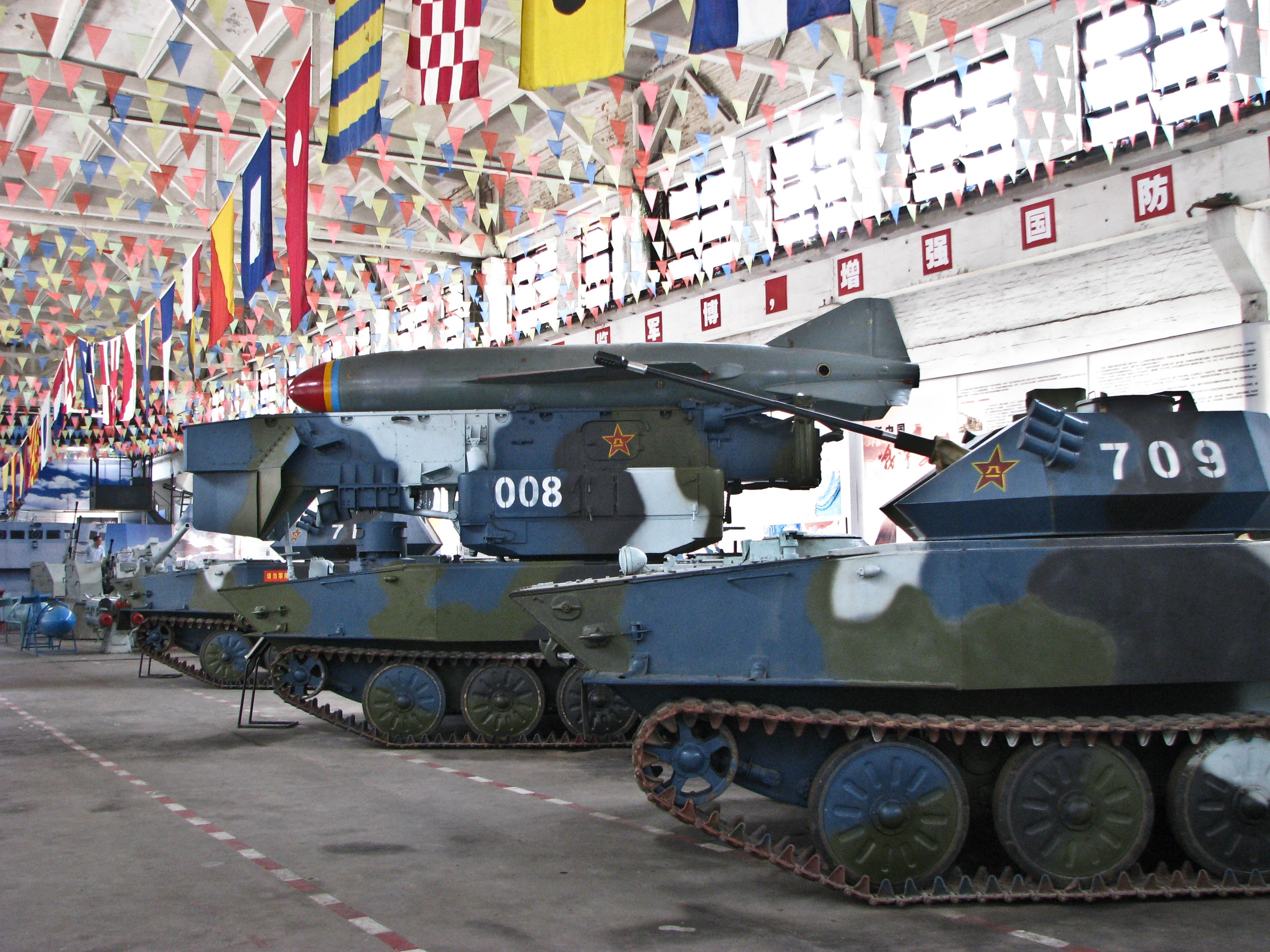
SY-1 missile on mobile launcher

SY-1
License produced version of the P-15 Termit. NATO reporting name CSS-N-1 Scrubbrush.
SY-1A
SY-1 with monopulse seeker and radar altimeter. The missile may or may not have entered service, but it did serve as the basis for the SY-2.
SY-2
NATO reporting names CSS-N-5 Sabot. The SY-2 is a significant redesign of the SY-1 missile and is no longer a copy of the P-15. The missile has a longer, somewhat slimmer airframe and is powered by a solid propellant rocket motor instead of the liquid propellant design from the Styx, granting a range of 50km. Despite being a different, much more modern missile, however, the SY-2 still shares launchers and support equipment with the SY-1 (P-15) and not only armed the 053H1G frigates built in the 1990s but also eventually replaced the old missiles on unmodernized Jianghu class frigates.
SY-2A
An improved SY-2 with a longer range, reportedly by adopting turbojet propulsion.
FL-1
The export version of the SY-1.
FL-2
The export version of the SY-2. Solid-fuel rocket powered.
FL-7
The export supersonic version of the SY-2.

=== HY series ===
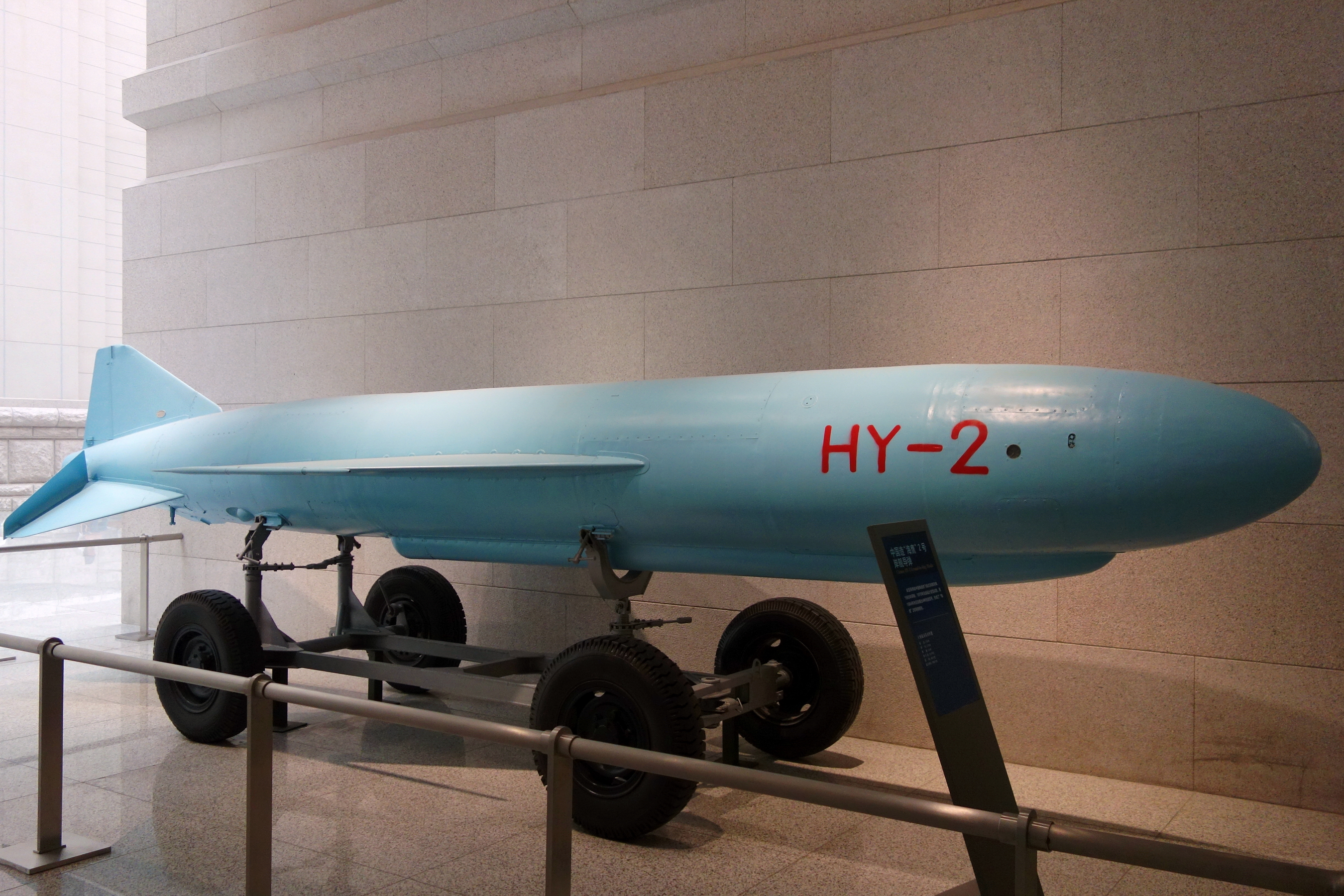
HY-2 missile

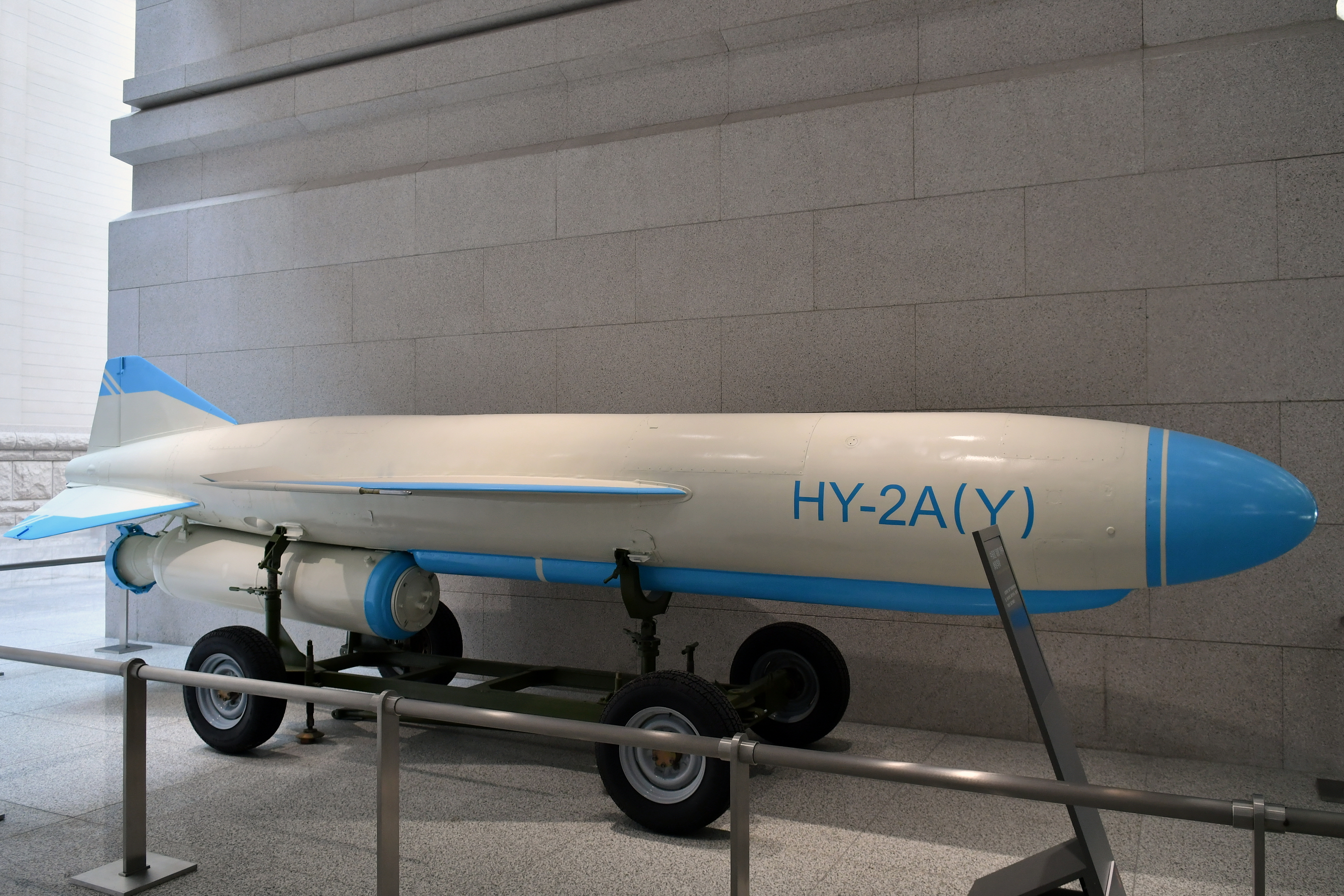
HY-2A missile

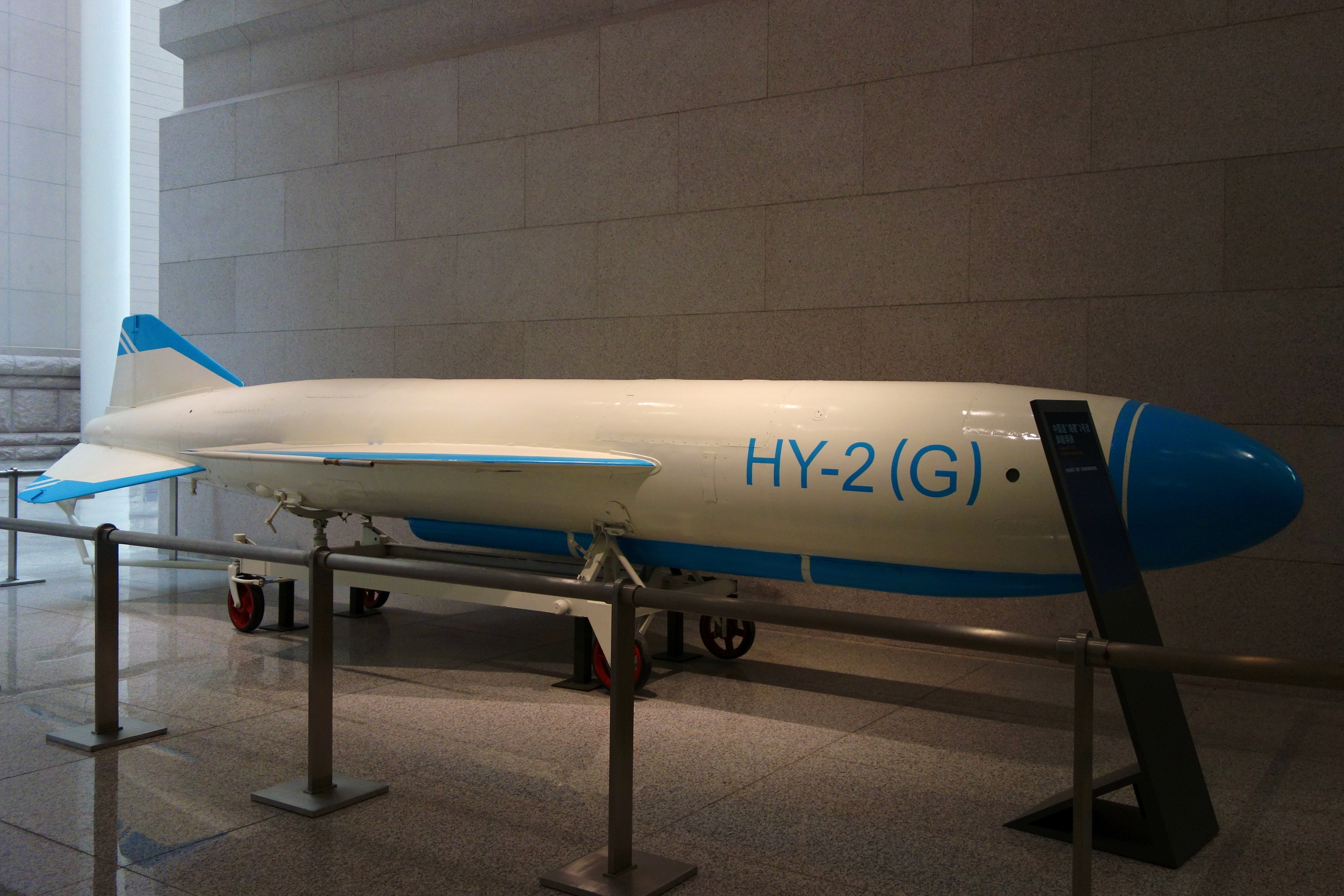
HY-2G missile

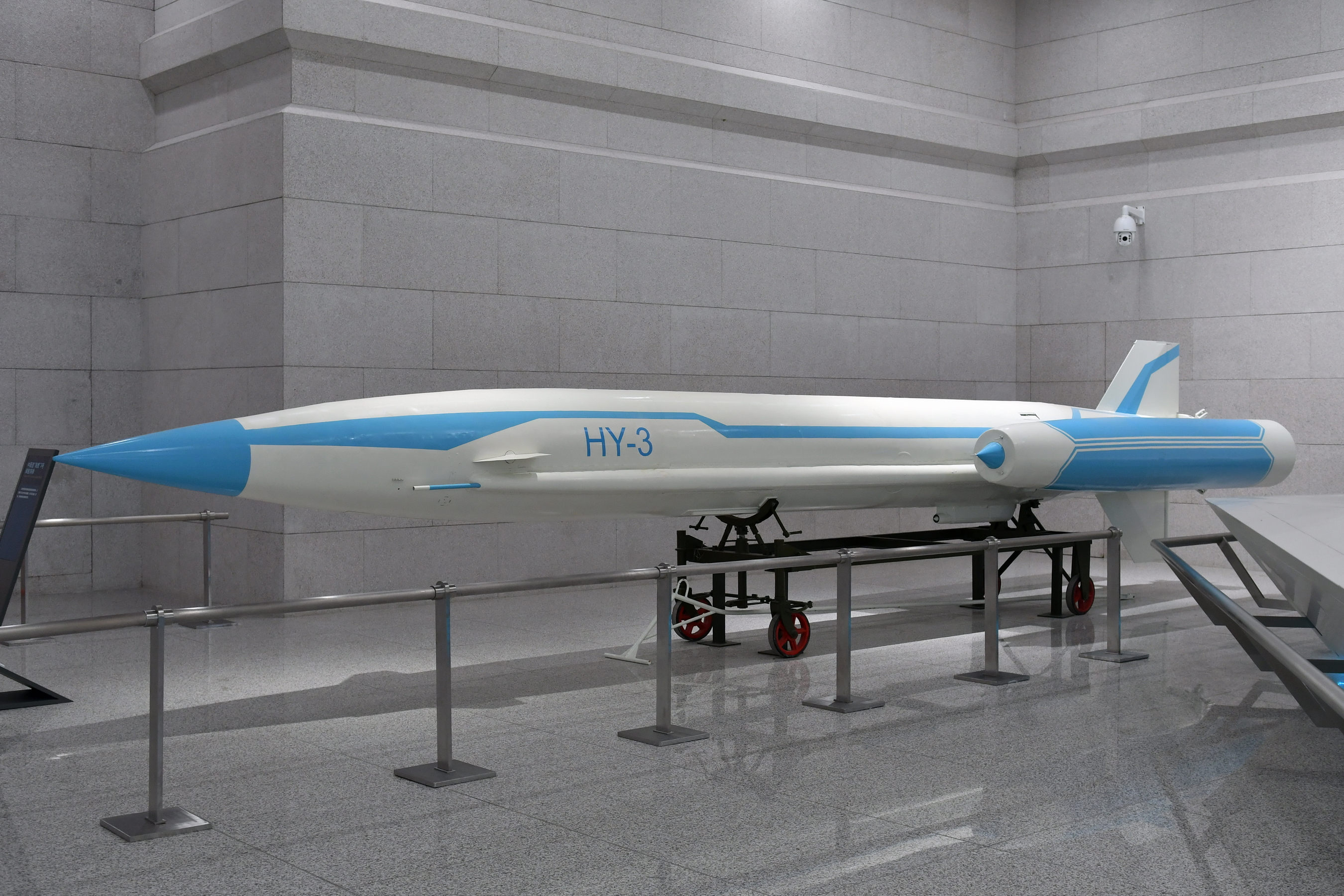
HY-3 missile

HY-1
An extended-range (70km) development of the SY-1 for coastal defense role; lost out to the more-ambitious HY-2 but was adopted for shipboard use due to its size growth from the SY-1 being sufficiently limited. NATO reporting names CSS-N-2 Safflower (ship-based) and CSSC-2 Silkworm (land-based.)
HY-2
A complete re-engineering of the SY-1 design optimized for a maximum range of 100km, resulting in a still larger/longer missile more suitable for coastal defense than the more-conservative HY-1. NATO reporting names CSS-N-3 Seersucker (ship-based) and CSSC-3 Seersucker (land-based.)
HY-3
Unsuccessful supersonic variant.
HY-4
Powered by a WP-11 turbojet, a reverse-engineered Teledyne-Ryan J69-T-41A. Used for LACM development. NATO reporting name Sadsack.
HY-41
An improved HY-4.
C-201
An export version of the HY-2.
C-301
An export version of the HY-3.
C-201W
An export version of the HY-4.
XM-41
An export version of the HY-41.

=== Further development ===
YJ-6
Anti-ship missile developed from the HY-2.
YJ-63
Air-launched LACM sharing visual characteristics of the HY-2, HY-4, and YJ-6. 200 km range.
AG-1
Longer-ranged variant of the HY-2 developed by North Korea.

== Operators ==
China

- People's Liberation Army Navy

Iran

- Islamic Republic of Iran Navy

Iraq

- Iraqi Navy

North Korea

- Korean People's Navy
