= C-704 =

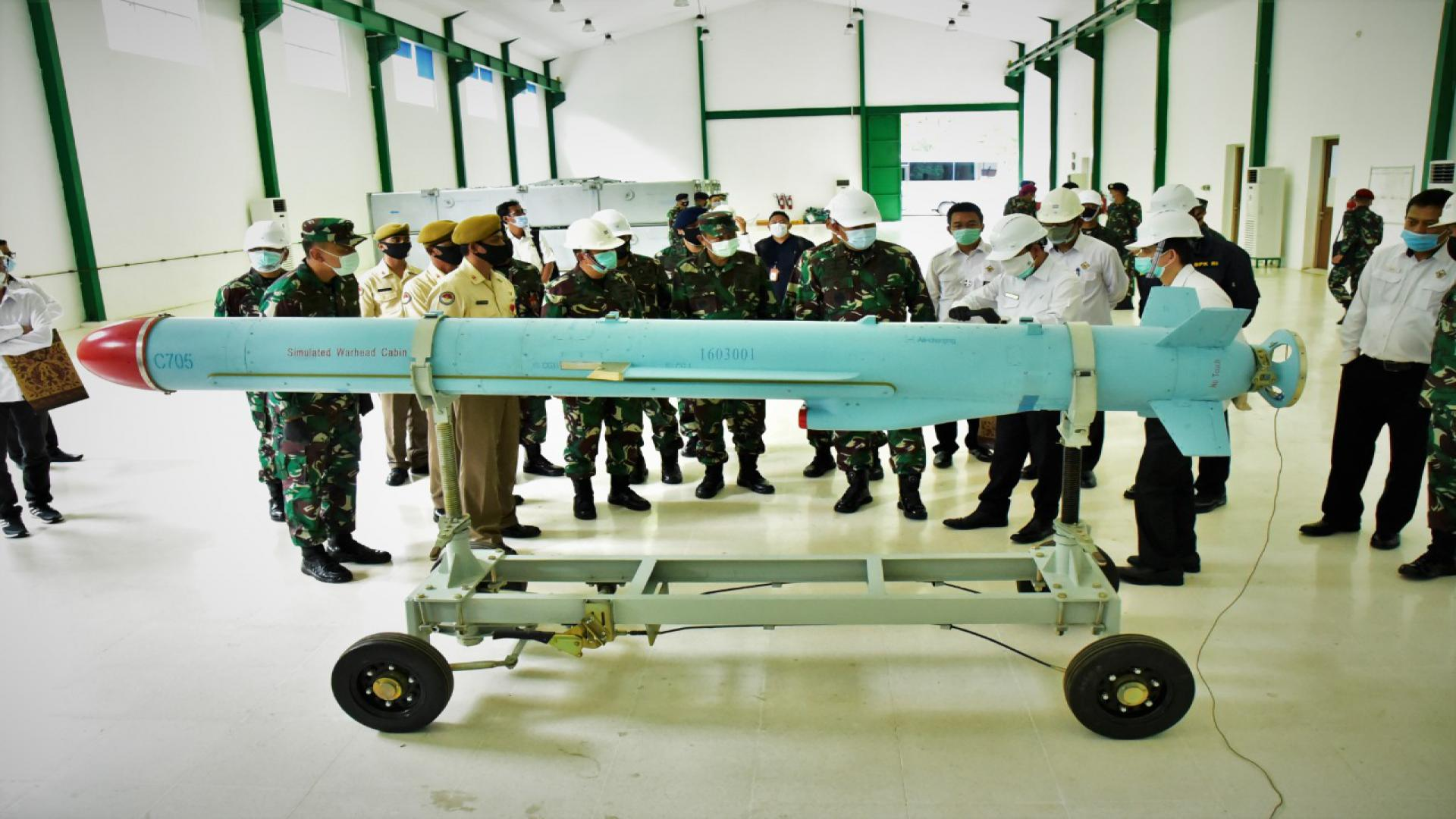
- C-705 missile of the Indonesian Navy at Batuporon naval base
- Type: Anti-ship / air-to-surface
- Place of origin: China

Service history
- In service: Prior to 2006 – present
- Used by: China; Bangladesh; Egypt; Indonesia; Iran; Pakistan

Production history
- Manufacturer: China Aerospace Science and Industry Corporation (CASIC)
- Produced: Prior to 2006

Specifications
- Mass: 360 kg (790 lb) (C-704)
- Length: 3.284 m (10.77 ft) (C-704)
- Diameter: 28 cm (11 in) (C-704)
- Wingspan: 480 mm (19 in) (folded; C-704); 1,018 mm (3.340 ft) (extended; C-704)
- Warhead: 130 kg (290 lb) warhead (C-704); 110–130 kg (240–290 lb) warhead (C-705)
- Detonation mechanism: Semi-armor-piercing
- Engine: Rocket motor (C-704); Turbojet (C-705)
- Propellant: Solid fuel
- Operational range: 38 km (24 mi; 21 nmi) (C-704); 75 km (47 mi; 40 nmi) (C-705; without booster); 170 km (110 mi; 92 nmi) (C-705; with booster)
- Flight altitude: 15–20 m (49–66 ft) (cruising; C-704); 5–7 m (16–23 ft) (terminal strike; C-704); 12.15 m (39.9 ft) (cruising; C-705)
- Maximum speed: Mach 0.8
- Guidance system: Active radar homing / imaging infrared homing / TV
- Launch platform: Air and surface

The C-704 is a Chinese anti-ship missile. The missile was developed by the Third Research Institute of the China Aerospace Science and Industry Corporation (CASIC). It's part of the C-701 series missiles.

== History and development ==
During the Falkland War, the Royal Air Force (RAF) used Westland Lynx to launch Sea Skua anti-ship missiles against Argentinian patrol boats. Helicopter-based anti-surface operation was seen as a viable option in any potential Taiwan Strait operation by the Chinese military industry. In the 1990s, China Aerospace Science and Industry Corporation (CASIC) Third Academy and Hongdu Aviation Industry Group (Hongdu) both initiated small anti-ship missile projects, resulting in CASIC's C-701 missile and Hongdu's TL-10 missile. Both missiles shared very similar specifications, but with a slight deviation in launch profile. The initial model of the C-701 focused on surface launch from boats, while TL-10 focused on helicopter air-launch integration.

In the 1990s, Hongdu developed TL-6, an enlarged TL-10. CASIC also developed the C-704, an enlarged C-701. The C-704 became a general-purpose air-to-surface missile that can engage both naval and land targets, making it a Chinese equivalent of the American AGM-65 Maverick.

Jane's Defence Weekly suspected that the reason behind the similar roles, dimensions, and performance of the C-701 and TL-10 was that they were part of a competition bid intended for Iran's Kowsar missile program. Sources conflict regarding which missile variant ultimately entered service with the Iranian military; one account states that the TL-10/FL-8 and TL-6/FL-9 became the Kowsar and Nasar missiles, while another suggests that the C-701 and C-704 were the ones developed into these two systems.

== Design ==
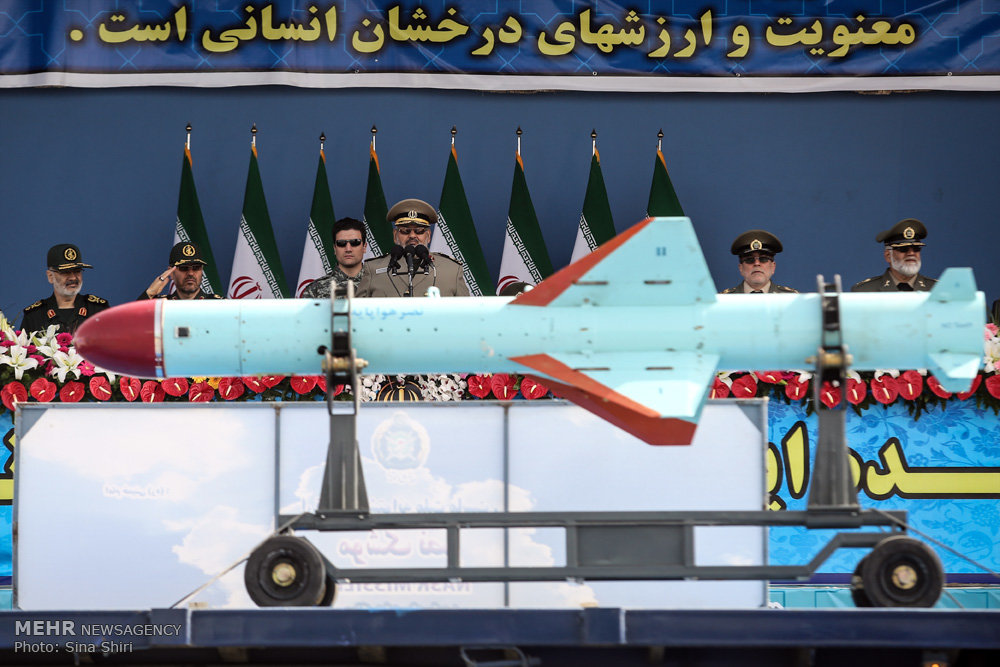
Iranian Nasr-1, based on the C-704

The C-704KD is an air-to-surface version of the C-704.

The C-705 is part of the C-701 series and a direct development of the C-704, resembling a miniaturized C-602. Compared to the C-704, the C-705 has a larger rocket motor with an additional turbojet engine. The C-705 with rocket booster and the engine can have a range of 170 km (92 nmi).

The C-705KD is an air-to-surface version of the C-705. It supports a radar seeker, a TV seeker, or an imaging infrared (IIR). It supports fire-and-forget mode, a data-link mid-course correction and target switching.

== Operational history ==
On 16 March 2011, Israeli Defense Forces allegedly intercepted a shipment of six C-704 missiles with launchers and Kelvin Hughes radar units, along with other munitions aboard the Liberian-flagged cargo vessel Victoria, managed by a French shipping company, en route from Turkey to Alexandria, in international waters. Israeli authorities stated that the weapons were of Iranian origin, and that they were being shipped to Hamas in the Gaza Strip.

In 2013, Bangladesh Navy corvette BNS Dhaleshwari fired four C-704 anti-ship missiles in a domestic naval exercise with all four of them hitting their target successfully.

On 14 September 2016, the Indonesian president witnessed two failed firings of C-705 missiles during a demonstration by the Indonesian Navy. The first missile failed to launch on command and fired unexpectedly five minutes later, missing the target. The second missile fired as expected but failed during flight. Indonesia planned to manufacture the missile locally; however, the project is halted due to the incident.

On 29 June 2016, the Indonesian Navy announced its purchase of the Chinese-made C-705. Indonesia used C-705 against land targets in 2026, the first public display of this capability.

== Variants ==
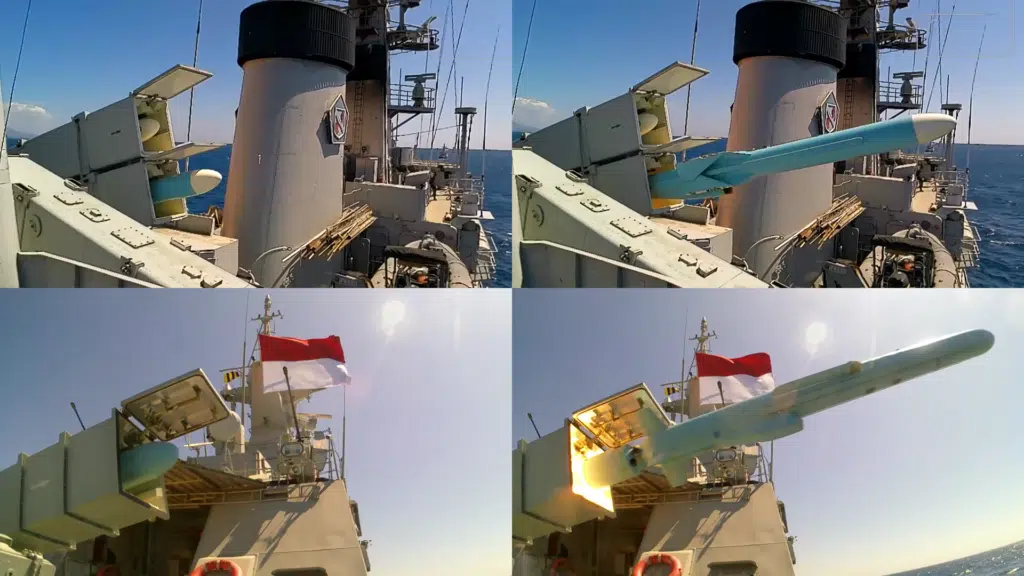
C-802 (top) and C-705 (bottom) missile launches against target ship KRI Slamet Riyadi.

C-704
Original variant
C-704KD
Air-to-surface variant of the C-704.
C-705
Anti-ship missile with a turbojet engine.
C-705KD
Air-to-surface variant of the C-705.

== Specifications ==
Missile specifications of Tianlong (TL) and C-701/C-704 series
	TL-10	C-701	TL-6	C-704	C-705
Manufacturer	Hongdu	CASIC	Hongdu	CASIC	CASIC
Launch mass	105 kg (231 lb)	117 kg (258 lb)	350 kg (770 lb)	360 kg (790 lb)	
Warhead	30 kg (66 lb) semi-armor piercing (SAP)	29–30 kg (64–66 lb) SAP	130 kg (290 lb)	130 kg (290 lb)	110–130 kg (240–290 lb)
Length	2.5 m (8.2 ft)	2.685 m (8.81 ft)	3.4–3.5 m (11–11 ft)	3.284 m (10.77 ft)	
Diameter	18 cm (7.1 in)	18 cm (7.1 in)	28 cm (11 in)	28 cm (11 in)	
Span	568 mm (22.4 in)	586 mm (23.1 in)	900 mm (35 in)	480–1,018 mm (18.9–40.1 in)	
Range	25 km (13 nmi)	25 km (13 nmi)	35 km (19 nmi)	38 km (21 nmi)	140–170 km (76–92 nmi)
Seeker	TV / Active radar / imaging infrared				
Motor	Dual thrust / dual chamber solid rocket				Turbojet engine w/ rocket booster
Speed	Mach 0.85	Mach 0.85	Mach 0.9	Mach 0.8	

== Operators ==
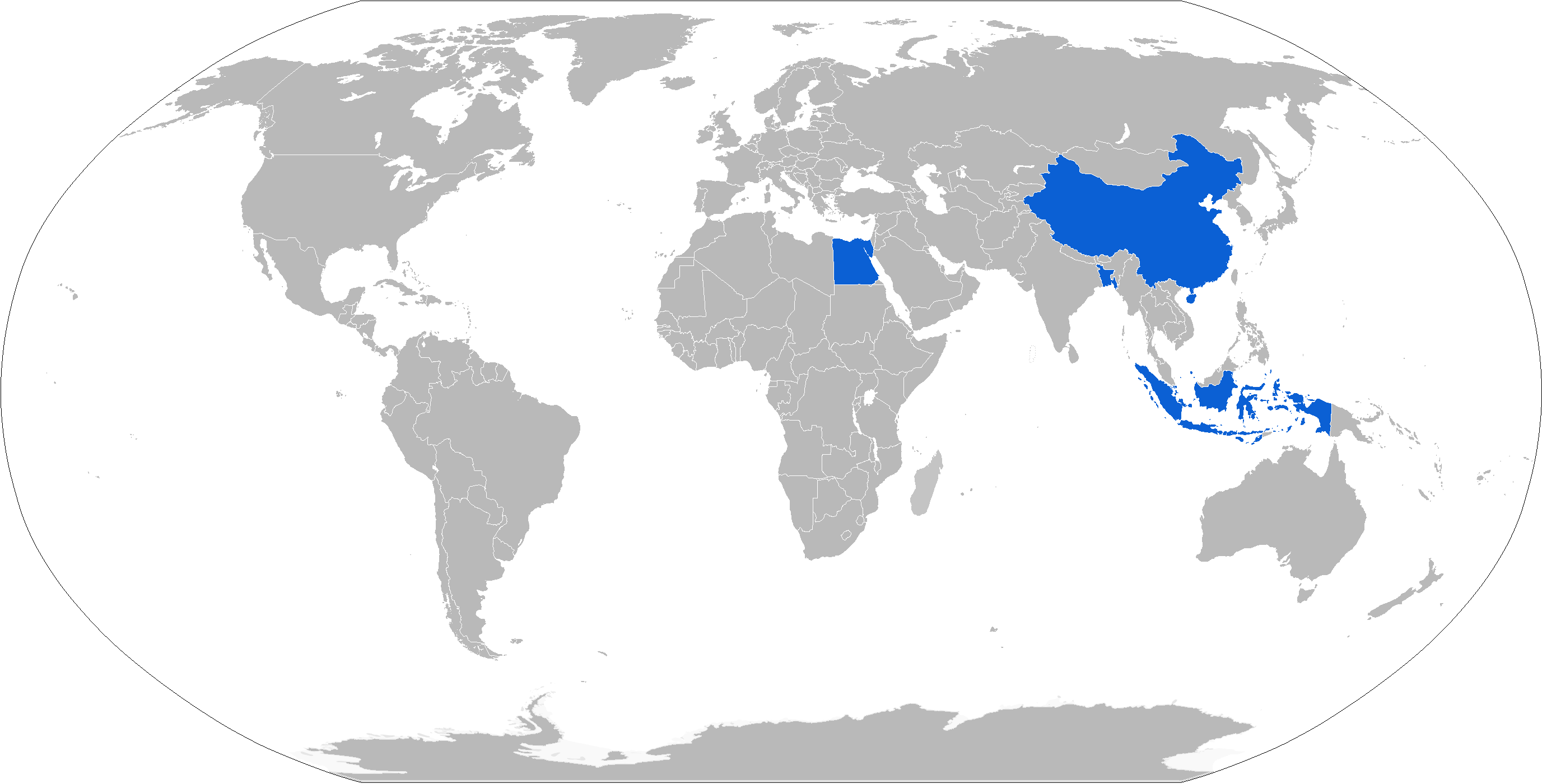
Map with C-704 operators in blue

=== Current operators ===
Bangladesh

- Bangladesh Navy: C-704

China

- People's Liberation Army Naval Air Force

Egypt

- Egyptian Navy

Indonesia

- Indonesian Navy: C-705

Iran

- Iranian navy: C-704 as Nasr-1.
- Islamic Revolutionary Guard Corps Navy: C-701, C-704, and C-705 carried by IRGC warships.

Pakistan

- Pakistan Air Force, C-705KD

== See also ==
- C-701 - a smaller anti-ship missile in the C-701 series
- TL-6 - the competitor to the C-704 missile
- AGM-65 Maverick
- AGM-84E
- AGM-119
- Kh-25
