= China Aerospace Science and Industry Corporation =

Chinese state-owned defense company

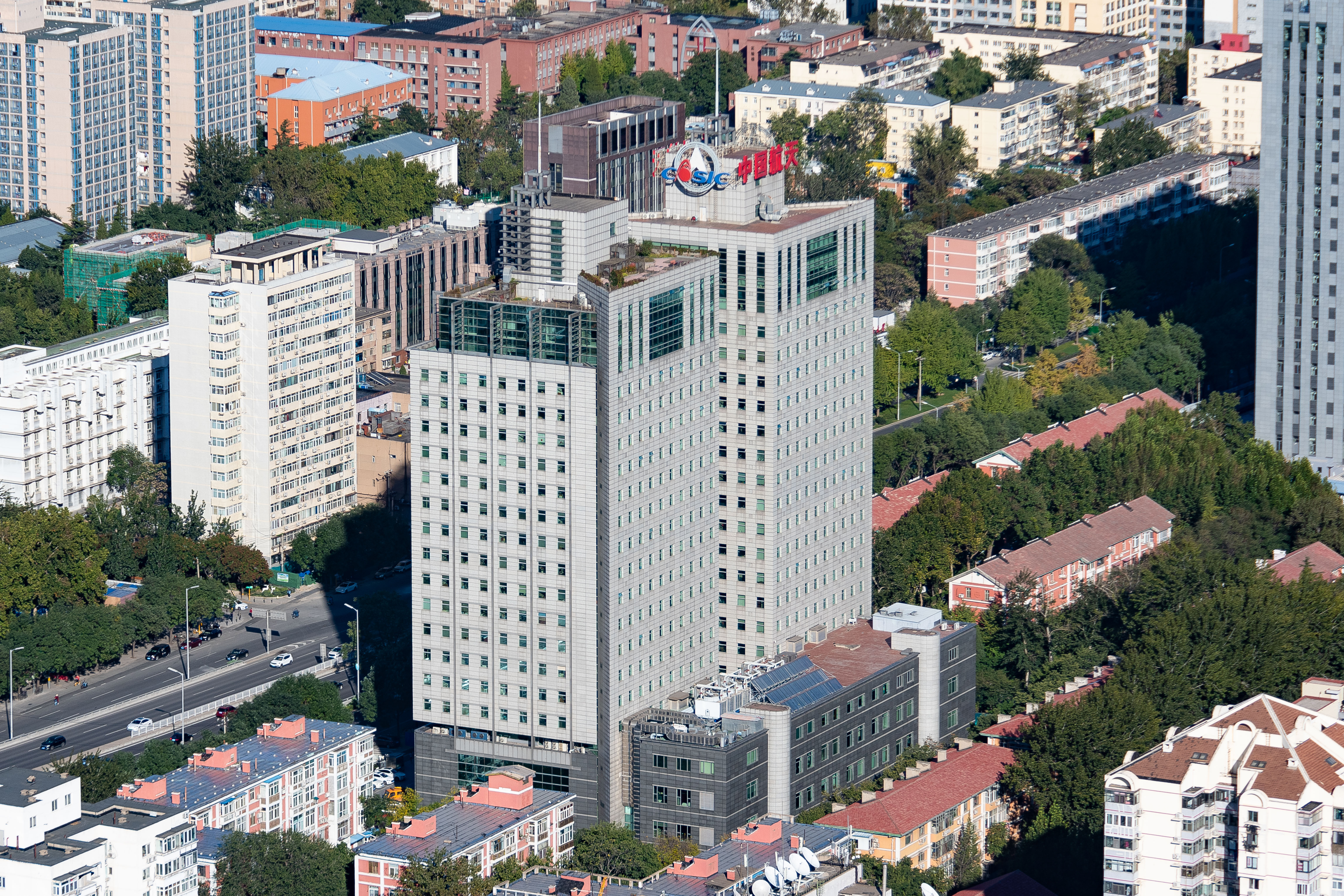
- CASIC headquarters
- Native name: 中国航天科工集团有限公司
- Formerly: China Aerospace Machinery and Electronics Corporation
- Company type: State-owned enterprise
- Industry: Aerospace, Defense, Automotive, Electronics, Telecommunications, Information Technology, construction & Infrastructure
- Predecessor: China Aerospace Corporation
- Founded: July 1, 1999; 26 years ago
- Headquarters: Haidian District, Beijing, China
- Area served: Worldwide
- Key people: Gao Hongwei (Chairman); Li Yue (President)
- Products: Satellite communication, missiles, radars, special vehicles, engines
- Revenue: US$34.07 billion (2017)
- Operating income: US$1.60 billion (2017)
- Total assets: US$44.27 billion (2017)
- Owner: State-owned Assets Supervision and Administration Commission of the State Council
- Number of employees: 145,987 (2017)
- Website: www.casic.com

China Aerospace Science & Industry Corporation
- Simplified Chinese: 中国航天科工集团公司
- Traditional Chinese: 中國航天科工集團公司
Transcriptions
Standard Mandarin
- Hanyu Pinyin: Zhōngguó Hángtiān kēgōng Jítuán Gōngsī
- Yale Romanization: JūngGwó HángTyān KēGūng JíTwán GūngSz̄

The China Aerospace Science and Industry Corporation (CASIC) is a Chinese state-owned enterprise that designs, develops and manufactures a range of spacecraft, launch vehicles, strategic and tactical missile systems, and ground equipment. CASIC is the largest maker of missiles in China.

== History ==
First established as the 5th Academy of the Ministry of National Defense in October 1956, it went through numerous name changes including the Ministry of the 7th Machinery Industry, the Ministry of Aerospace Industry, the Ministry of Aviation and Aerospace Industry, China Aerospace Corporation, China Aerospace Machinery and Electronics Corporation in July 1999, and finally the present name China Aerospace Science & Industry Corporation in July 2001. CASIC owns seven academies, two scientific research and development bases, six public listed companies, and over 620 other companies and institutes scattered nationwide, with more than 145,987 employees.

From 2011 onwards, CASIC has supplied North Korea with 16-wheel and 18-wheel transporter erector launchers in support of North Korea's ballistic missile/nuclear program.

In 2017, the total assets of CASIC were worth US$ 44.27 billion, its revenue was US$34.07 billion, and profit US$1.60 billion.

Since 2020, CASIC has shipped crude oil from Venezuela on tankers that it acquired from PetroChina.

=== U.S. investment prohibition ===
In November 2020, Donald Trump issued an executive order prohibiting any American company or individual from owning shares in companies that the United States Department of Defense has listed as having links to the People's Liberation Army (PLA), which included CASIC.

== Products ==
CASIC is the biggest missile weapon system developing and manufacturing enterprise in China. It is known for developing, researching and manufacturing air defense missile systems, cruise missile systems, solid-propellant rockets, space technological products and other technologies with products covering various fields of land, sea, air, and electromagnetic spectrum. CASIC has provided dozens of advanced missile equipment systems for various nations, and contributed to Chinese crewed space flight, lunar exploration and other Chinese national projects.

CASIC engages in strategic industries concerning Chinese national security.

In early 2019, it was reported that CASIC had developed a "road-mobile laser defense system called the LW-30, which uses a high-energy laser beam to destroy targets." CASIC also introduced the "CM-401 supersonic anti-ship ballistic missile."

The CASIC second academy produces five series of missiles:

- Flying Dragon (FD; Chinese: 飞龙) series of long-range area defense missiles
  - FD-2000 (HQ-9)
- Flying Mongoose (FM; Chinese: 飞獴) series of short-range area defense missiles
  - FM-2000 (HQ-17)
  - FM-3000
- Flying Leopard (FL; Chinese: 飞豹) series of terminal air defense missiles
  - FL-2000
  - FL-3000N
- Quick Wolf (QW; Chinese: 快狼) series of man-portable air-defense systems (MANPADS)
  - QW-2
- Buffalo (B; Chinese: 野牛) series of tactical surface-to-surface missiles
  - B-611

The CASIC also produces other products:

- C series of anti-ship/land-attack missiles
  - C-101 (YJ-1)
  - C-201
  - C-301
  - C-601 (YJ-6)
  - C-602 (YJ-62)
  - C-701 (YJ-7)
  - C-704
  - C-705
  - C-801 (YJ-8)
  - C-802 (YJ-83)
- BP series of guided surface-to-surface missiles
  - BP-12
- SY series of guided rockets
  - SY-400
  - SY-300
- FK series of air defense systems
  - FK-1000
  - FK-2000
  - FK-3000
  - FK-4000
  - FK-3
- CJ series of cruise missiles:
  - CJ-10
- CM series of land-attack missiles:
  - CM-102
  - CM-302 (YJ-12)
  - CM-400
  - CM-400AKG
  - CM-401
  - CM-501G
  - CM-502
  - CM-506
  - CM-602G
  - CM-708
  - CM-802
  - CM-98 (AKF-98)
- WJ series of unmanned aerial vehicles:
  - WJ-100
  - WJ-600
  - WJ-700
- YZ series of guided bombs:
  - YZ-100
  - YZ-200
- AG series air-to-ground missiles:
  - AG-300

== See also ==
- China Aerospace Science and Technology Corporation (CASC)
- China National Space Administration (CNSA)
- Aviation Industry Corporation of China (AVIC)
- People's Liberation Army Air Force
- Commission of Science, Technology and Industry for National Defense
