= Hongdu =

Chinese aircraft manufacturer

Coordinates: 28.634818°N 115.93061°E

Hongdu Aviation Industry Group
- Type: Subsidiary
- Industry: Defence
- Founded: December 1934; 91 years ago, as Sino-Italian National Aircraft Works; 1951; 75 years ago, as Hongdu
- Headquarters: Nanchang, Jiangxi, China
- Key people: Song Chengzhi (Chairman)
- Products: Military aircraft Unmanned aerial vehicles
- Number of employees: 20,000
- Parent: Aviation Industry Corporation of China
- Website: www.hongdu.com.cn

Hongdu Aviation Industry Group Ltd. (HAIG) (Chinese: 洪都航空工业集团), formerly China Nanchang Aircraft Manufacturing Corporation or CNAMC, is a Chinese aircraft manufacturer and supplier to the Chinese military. It is based in Nanchang, Jiangxi and is a subsidiary of the Aviation Industry Corporation of China (AVIC).

== History ==
=== Republic of China ===
Hongdu's predecessor was the Sino-Italian National Aircraft Works (SINAW), established in December 1934 in Nanchang. It was a joint venture between the Republic of China and the Kingdom of Italy, after Chiang Kai-shek signed an agreement with Italian dictator Benito Mussolini a year before. In 1935, factories were built at Qingyunpu Airport (then known as Sanjiadian) and Laoyingfang Airport. Song Ziliang (T. L. Soong) served as the first chairman, and an Italian served as general manager.

After the outbreak of the Second Sino-Japanese War in 1937, SINAW factories were severely damaged by Japanese aerial bombing. When the Chinese government discovered that Italians served as guides for Japanese pilots, it broke off its relationship with Italy, and all Italian employees left the company by the end of the year, with 300 Chinese employees remaining. On 9 December 1937, Chiang Kai-shek confiscated Italian shares and properties and renamed the company Central Nanchang Aircraft Manufacturing Factory (中央南昌飛機製造廠). To evade Japanese attacks, it was relocated to Nanchuan, Chongqing, and was renamed No. 2 Aircraft Manufacturing Factory (第二飛機製造廠). After the end of the war, the company was moved back to Sanjiadian Airport in Nanchang in 1947.

=== People's Republic of China ===
After the founding of the People's Republic of China in 1949, since Hongdu is the ancient name of Nanchang city, the company was re-established in 1951 as the state-run Hongdu Machinery-building Factory and later as Nanchang Aircraft Manufacturing Corporation. In March 1998 the company's name was changed to Hongdu Aviation Industry (Group) Corporation.

Since its founding, Hongdu used Qingyunpu Airport for test flights. On 23 December 2009, the Jiangxi provincial government reached an agreement with Aviation Industry Corporation of China to build the new Nanchang Yaohu Airport in the Nanchang Aviation Industrial City to replace Qingyunpu Airport. Construction began in November 2016, and Yaohu Airport was opened on 16 August 2018.

== Products ==
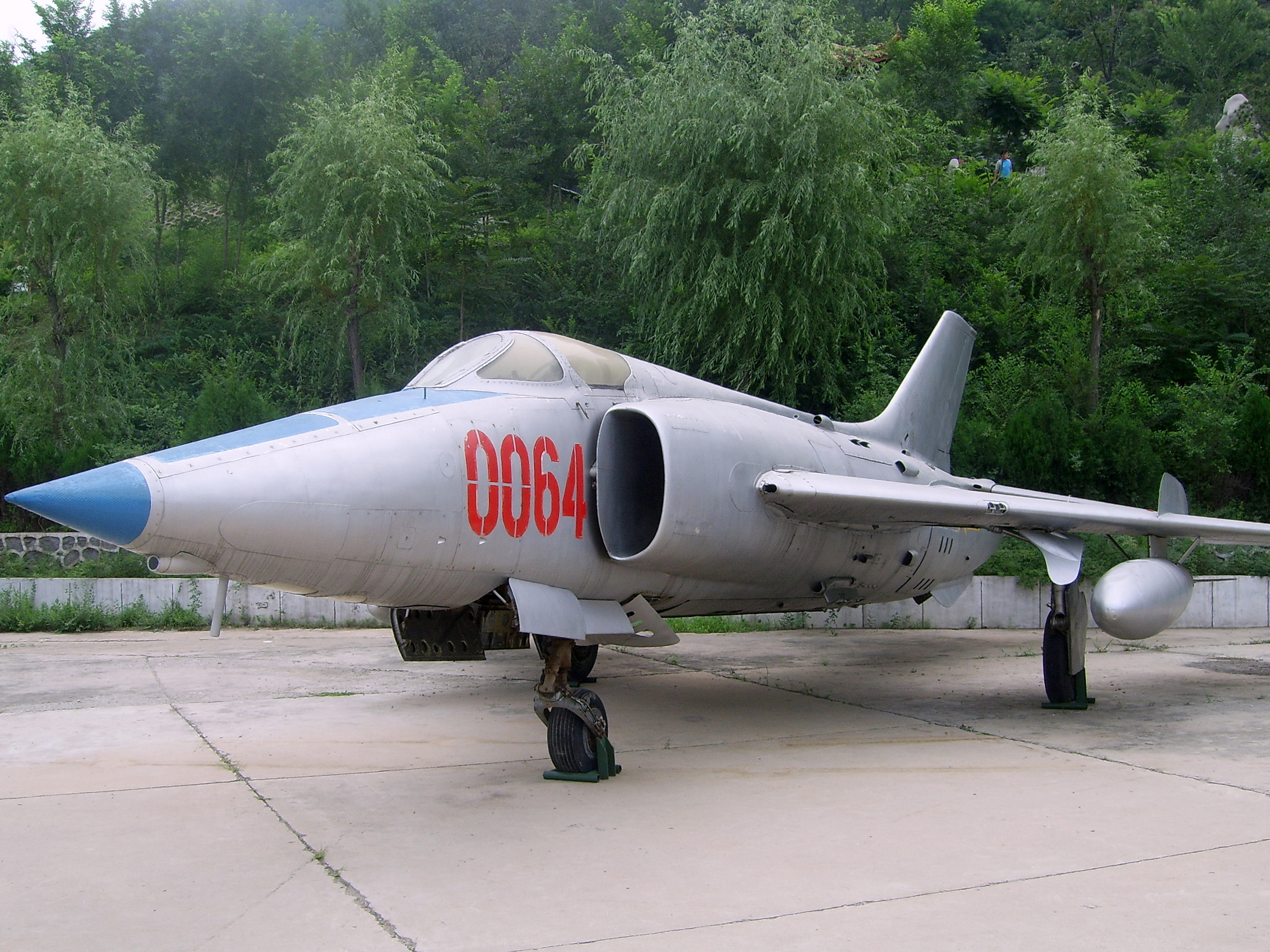
Nanchang Q-5 Fantan

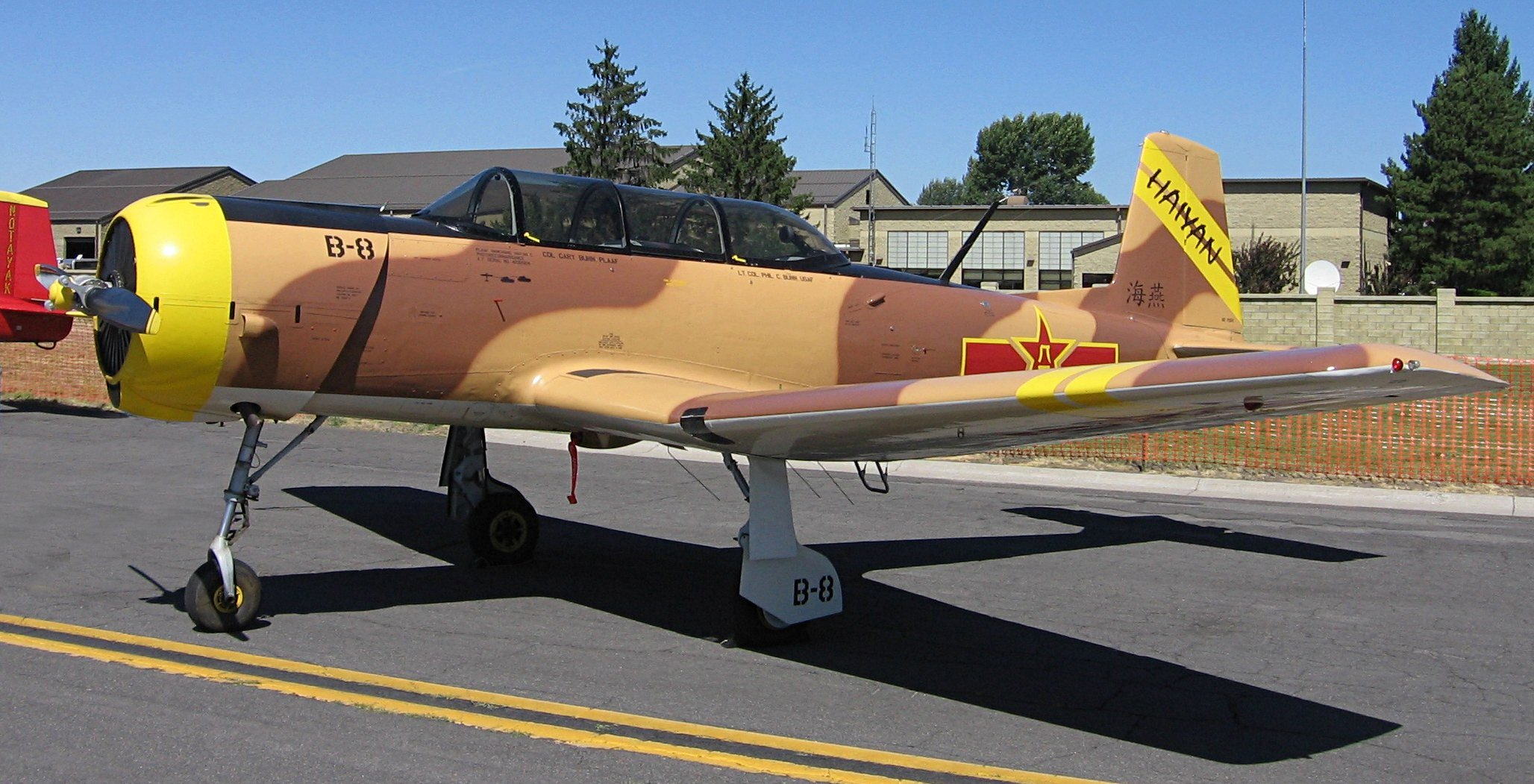
Nanchang CJ-6

Attack aircraft

- Q-5 "Fantan" – single-seat dual-engined supersonic attack aircraft based on the Mikoyan-Gurevich MiG-19, exported under the designation A-5.
- Q-6 – variable sweep-winged attacker, similar to MiG-23BN; cancelled.
- GJ-11 – unmanned combat attack aircraft with stealth design.

Cancelled fighters

- J-12 – a 1970 Chinese lightweight supersonic fighter; development abandoned in 1977. Only prototypes built.

Trainers

- CJ-5 – tandem two-seat military primary trainer aircraft - variant of Yak-18 (1958).
- CJ-6 – basic and advanced trainer, similar to the Yakovlev Yak-18.
- CJ-7 – two-seat piston engined trainer jointly developed by Hongdu and Yakovlev.
- NAMC/PAC K-8 – two seat basic trainer.
- Hongdu JL-8 – two-seat trainer.
- Hongdu L-15 – supersonic trainer.

Utility

- Hongdu N-5 – multi-use agriculture & forest aircraft.

Helicopters

- MD500E – light and multi-purpose helicopter.
- MD520N – light and multi-purpose helicopter.
- MD530F – light and multi-purpose helicopter.
- MD600N – single-turbine engine helicopter, stretched version of MD600.

Transport

- Yun-5 (Y-5) – light utility/transport biplane, licensed version of An-2.

Vehicles

- Chang Jiang 750cc sidecar motorcycles – derived from Soviet copies of the 1938 BMW R71.

Missiles

- Sea Eagle (Chinese: 海鹰), HY series anti-ship missiles
- Upstream (Chinese: 上游), SY series anti-ship missiles
- Sky Dragon (Chinese: 天龙), TL series air-to-surface missiles

  - TL-1
  - TL-2
  - TL-6
  - TL-7/TL-17 (KD-88)
  - TL-10 (YJ-9)
  - TL-20 (small-diameter guided bomb)
  - TL-30 (anti-radiation loitering missile)
