= Nasr-1 =

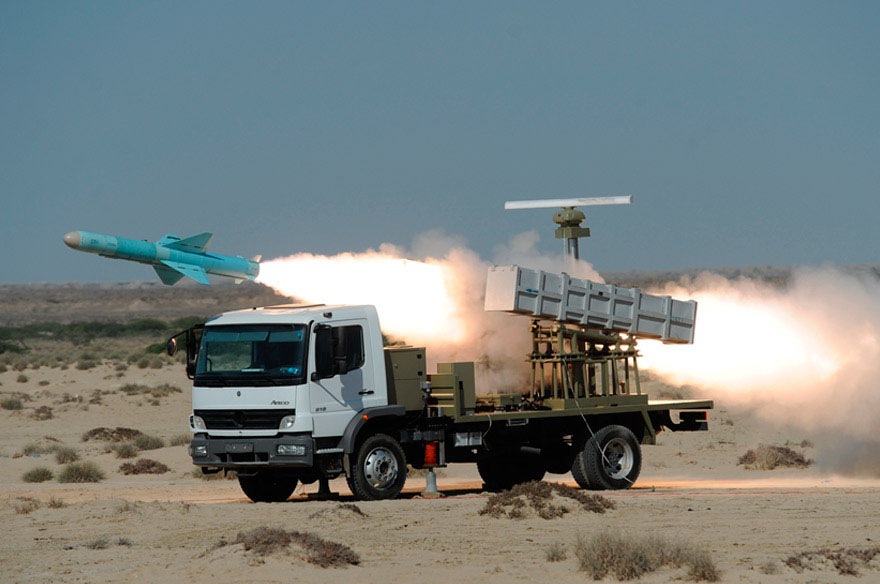
- Firing Nasr-1 Missile from a truck launcher in Velayat-90 Naval Exercise.
- Type: Anti-ship missile
- Place of origin: Iran

Service history
- In service: December 2008
- Used by: Iran

Production history
- Manufacturer: Iran Aviation Industries Organization

Specifications
- Mass: 350 kg
- Length: 3.5 m
- Diameter: 0.28 m
- Wingspan: 0.9 m (unfolded)
- Warhead: 150 kg time-delayed semi-armour-piercing high-explosive
- Engine: Solid rocket engine
- Operational range: 35 km
- Maximum speed: Mach 0.8 to 0.9
- Guidance system: TV-homing, millimetre radar

The Nasr-1 (Persian: نصر-۱) is an Iranian anti-ship cruise missile. According to its export catalog, it can destroy 1,500-tonne targets such as small frigates. Nasr-1 missile can be launched from both inland bases and offshore military vessels, and is being modified to be fired from helicopters and submarines.

The missile has a cigarette shaped body with four large foldable fins attached to the middle part and four smaller ones attached to the end of the missile near the exhaust.

In December 2008, an Iranian naval force successfully test-fired the surface-to-surface Nasr-1 during the final stage of "Unity 87" wargames in the Persian Gulf waters. Following the successful test firing, on 7 March 2010, Iran's defence minister announced mass-production of Nasr-1 missiles.

In early 2012, during Velayet-e 90 wargames, it was tested from land-based TELs. On 10 February 2013, head of Iran Aviation Industries Organization announced that an air-launched version of Qader and Nasr-1 anti-ship cruise missiles will be tested in a week. It also has a submarine launched version called Jask-2.

The Nasr-1 may purportedly be a copy of the Chinese C-704 short range missile.
