= FT PGB =

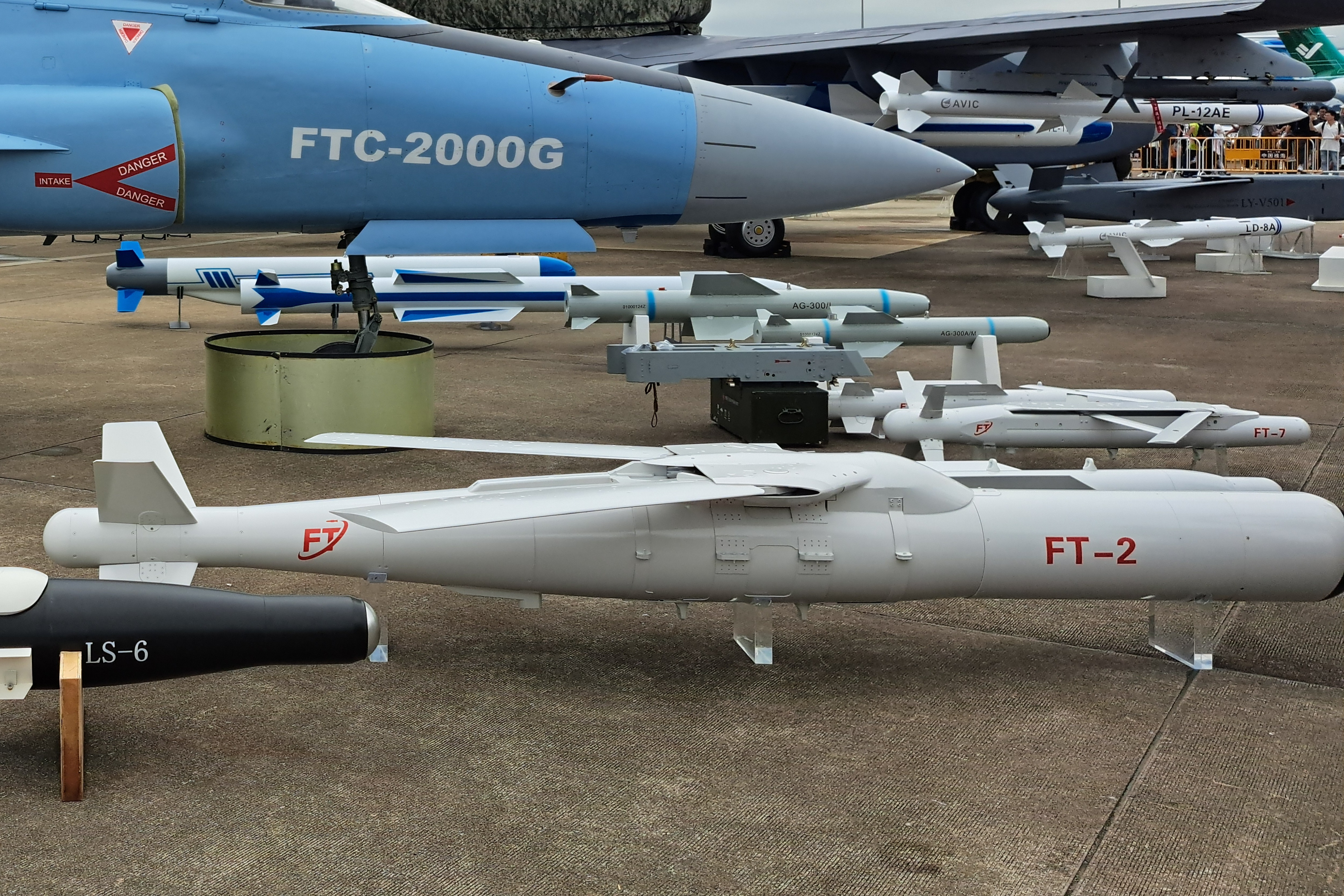
- FT-2 and FT-7 bombs showcased at Zhuhai Airshow 2024
- Type: Precision-guided bomb
- Place of origin: China

Service history
- In service: 2006–present
- Used by: China

Production history
- Manufacturer: China Academy of Launch Vehicle Technology (CALT)
- Produced: 2006–present

Specifications
- Mass: up to 510 kg (1,120 lb)
- Length: depends on the gravity bomb used
- Height: depends on the gravity bomb used
- Diameter: depends on the gravity bomb used
- Wingspan: depends on the gravity bomb used
- Warhead: various gravity bombs
- Detonation mechanism: Impact / Proximity
- Operational range: depends on the altitude released
- Maximum speed: freefall
- Guidance system: inertial + satellite guidance
- Launch platform: aerial platforms

Fei Teng (Chinese: 飞腾; pinyin: fēi téng; lit. 'Soaring'), abbreviated as FT, is a series of precision-guided munitions (PGM) developed by China Academy of Launch Vehicle Technology (CALT), a subsidiary of China Aerospace Science and Technology Corporation (CASC). Competing with the LS series, the FT series bombs serve similar roles to the American JDAM, JDAM-ER, and Laser JDAM bombs.

== Development ==
=== Background ===
The Chinese development of the precision-guided bomb began in the 1970s after the Chinese military observed the American usage of Paveway in the Vietnam War. Factory 624, later known as the Harbin Jiancheng Group, a subsidiary of Norinco, began the development process in 1974, with prototypes completed in 1980. Between 1984 and 1985, the guided bomb was tested via ground laser designation, while in 1986, the bomb was tested with an aerial laser targeting pod prototype. Prototypes were tested on the H-5 bomber. The project was canceled in the late 1980s due to budgetary issues. The prototype guided bomb in the canceled project was designated Type 7712.

A new laser-guided bomb project was initiated in 1992 after Chinese observation of the Gulf War. This project received more budgetary, human, and political resources. The bomb system was tasked to the Luoyang-based China Airborne Missile Academy (CAMA, 612th Research Institute), and the targeting pod was tasked to the Luoyang Optoelectro Technology Development Center (LOTDC, 613th Research Institute), and the production was tasked to the Factory 624 (Harbin Jiancheng Group). The final product was LS-500J laser-guided bomb, later renamed LT-2 laser-guided bomb for export. LS-500J (LT-2) was one of the most widely used guided bombs in China's arsenal.

Eventually, the original LS-500J branched out to the other series of guided bombs, which were manufactured by different defense factories and institutions:

- The LS (Chinese: 雷石; pinyin: léi shí; lit. 'Thunder Stone') and LT (Chinese: 雷霆; pinyin: léi tíng; lit. 'Thunderclap') series guidance bomb kits, with the LS series focusing on satellite glide bomb, whereas the LT focus on laser guidance, produced by Luoyang Optoelectro Technology Development Center of Aviation Industry Corporation of China (AVIC).
- The FT (Chinese: 飞腾; pinyin: Fēi téng; lit. 'Soaring') series of guided bombs, produced by China Aerospace Science and Technology Corporation (CASC).
- The TG (Chinese: 天戈; pinyin: tiān gē; lit. 'Lambda Boötis'), TD (Chinese: 天罡; pinyin: tiān gāng; lit. 'Big Dipper'), and TL (Chinese: 天雷; pinyin: tiān léi; lit. 'Sky Thunder') series of guided bombs, produced by various subsidiaries of Norinco, such as Harbin Jiancheng Group.
- The YL (Chinese: 云雷; pinyin: yún léi; lit. 'Cloud Thunder') and YJ (Chinese: 云箭; pinyin: yún jían; lit. 'Cloud Arrow') series of guided bombs, produced by China South Industries Group and marketed via Norinco.
- The YZ series guided bomb, produced by China Aerospace Science and Industry Corporation (CASIC).

=== FT series ===
FT series precision-guided bomb was first revealed in 2006 Zhuhai Airshow.

Produced by CALT, the Feiteng (FT) series is a direct competitor to the LS series precision bombs produced by the Luoyang AVIC. Similar to the LS series, FT bombs are primarily guided by the satellite and inertial navigation system. The bombs are compatible with Chinese BeiDou, American GPS, and Russian GLONASS. The FT-1 is the satellite/inertial bomb kit in 500 kg (1,100 lb) class with a strap-on strakes, similar to the performance of the GBU-32 JDAM. FT-2 is an FT-1 kit with range extension planar glide wings, boosting its maximum range from 18 km (9.7 nmi) to 90 km (49 nmi). FT-1 and FT-3 were the earliest variants to be publicly revealed. Later, the FT series expanded into more sizes and guidance methods. There are also constant improvements between iterations shown in the expos. For example, the FT-3 revealed in 2006 used a tail kit derived from LS-6, but the design was changed in 2008 to a unique shape.

Lighter bombs, such as FT-9 and FT-10, can be equipped on Chinese unmanned combat aerial vehicle (UCAV) platforms, such as Wing Loong II.

== Variants ==
- FT-1: satellite guided 500 kg (1,100 lb) bombs with cruciform strakes.
- FT-2: satellite guided 500 kg (1,100 lb) bombs with range extension planar glide wings.
- FT-12: satellite guided 500 kg (1,100 lb) bombs with range extension planar glide wings and a rocket booster.
- FT-3: satellite guided 250 kg (550 lb) bombs with cruciform strakes.
- FT-3A: satellite guided 250 kg (550 lb) bombs with cruciform strakes and laser homing module.
- FT-4: satellite guided 250 kg (550 lb) bombs with range extension planar glide wings.
- FT-5: satellite guided 100 kg (220 lb) bombs with cruciform strakes.
- FT-6: satellited guided 250 kg (550 lb) low-drag bombs with range extension planar glide wings.
- FT-6A: satellited guided 250 kg (550 lb) low-drag bombs with range extension planar glide wings and a homing module.
- FT-7: satellite guided 130 kg (290 lb) bombs with diamond wing.
- FT-7A: satellite guided 130 kg (290 lb) bombs with cruciform strakes and modular homing module.
- FT-8C: lightweight laser-guided bomb, 20 kg (44 lb) with a range of 8.85 km (4.78 nmi).
- FT-8D: lightweight laser-guided bomb, 8 kg (18 lb) with a range of 4.5 km (2.4 nmi).
- FT-9: satellite guided 50 kg (110 lb) bombs with cruciform strakes.
- FT-10: satellite guided 25 kg (55 lb) bombs with cruciform strakes.

== Specifications ==
Bomb specifications
	FT-1	FT-2	FT-12	FT-3	FT-3A	FT-6	FT-6A	FT-7	FT-7A	FT-9
Launch mass	510 kg (1,120 lb)	620 kg (1,370 lb)	680 kg (1,500 lb)	240 kg (530 lb)		285 kg (628 lb)	300 kg (660 lb)	95–125 kg (209–276 lb)	100–150 kg (220–330 lb)	42 kg (93 lb)
Warhead	440 kg (970 lb)			210 kg (460 lb)				78 kg (172 lb)		18 kg (40 lb)
Warhead type	Blast						Blast fragmentation	Blast penetration	Blast fragmentation	Blast fragmentation penetration
Max range	19 km (10 nmi)	85 km (46 nmi)	140 km (76 nmi)	19 km (10 nmi)		78 km (42 nmi)	58 km (31 nmi)	58–88 km (31–48 nmi)	14 km (7.6 nmi)	5–20 km (2.7–10.8 nmi)
Release Altitude	5–12 km (16,000–39,000 ft)	3–12 km (9,800–39,400 ft)	6–12 km (20,000–39,000 ft)	3–10 km (9,800–32,800 ft)		6–10 km (20,000–33,000 ft)		3–15 km (9,800–49,200 ft)	3–8 km (9,800–26,200 ft)	3–10 km (9,800–32,800 ft)
Release Speed	600–1,000 km/h (320–540 kn)							120–720 km/h (65–389 kn) (UAV); 600–1,000 km/h (320–540 kn) (Aircraft)	120–370 km/h (65–200 kn)	120–370 km/h (65–200 kn) (UAV); 600–1,000 km/h (320–540 kn) (Aircraft)
Guidance type	GNSS, INS				GNSS, INS, SAL	GNSS, INS	GNSS, INS, ARS	GNSS, INS	GNSS, INS, SAL	GNSS, INS, SAL / TV / IR
Steering	Cruciform trailing edges	Cruciform trailing edges + Panel wings	Cruciform trailing edges + Panel wings + Solid rocket booster	Cruciform trailing edges		Cruciform trailing edges + Panel wings		Cruciform trailing edges + Diamond wings	Cruciform trailing edges	
Accuracy (CEP)	≤20m		≤15m	≤20m	≤3m	≤15m	≤5m	≤15m	≤3m	≤15m (GNSS / INS) ≤5m (TV / IR) ≤3m (SAL)

== Operators ==
- China: People's Liberation Army
  - People's Liberation Army Air Force
  - People's Liberation Army Navy Air Force
- Pakistan: Pakistan Armed Forces
  - Pakistan Air Force

== See also ==
- LS-6, comparable glide bombs developed by AVIC Luoyang.
- TG series, comparable guided bombs developed by Harbin Jiancheng Group.
- Joint Direct Attack Munition
