= YL PGB =

- Type: Precision-guided bomb
- Place of origin: China

Service history
- In service: 2012—present
- Used by: China

Production history
- Manufacturer: China South Industries Group
- Produced: 2012—present

Specifications
- Mass: up to 1,000 kg (2,200 lb)
- Length: depends on model
- Height: depends on model
- Diameter: depends on model
- Wingspan: depends on model
- Warhead: various gravity bombs
- Detonation mechanism: Impact / Proximity
- Operational range: depends on the altitude released
- Maximum speed: freefall
- Guidance system: inertial navigation, laser guidance, satellite guidance
- Launch platform: aerial platforms

Yunlei (Chinese: 云雷; pinyin: yún léi; lit. 'Cloud Thunder'), abbreviated as YL or prefixed with CS/BB, is a series of precision-guided munitions (PGM) and special-purpose bombs developed by China South Industries Group.

== Development ==
=== Background ===
The Chinese development of the precision-guided bomb began in the 1970s after the Chinese military observed the American usage of Paveway in the Vietnam War. Factory 624, later known as the Harbin Jiancheng Group, a subsidiary of Norinco, began the development process in 1974, with prototypes completed in 1980. Between 1984 and 1985, the guided bomb was tested via ground laser designation, while in 1986, the bomb was tested with an aerial laser targeting pod prototype. Prototypes were tested on the H-5 bomber. The project was canceled in the late 1980s due to budgetary issues. The prototype guided bomb in the canceled project was designated Type 7712.

A new laser-guided bomb project was initiated in 1992 after Chinese observation of the Gulf War. This project received more budgetary, human, and political resources. The bomb system was tasked to the Luoyang-based China Airborne Missile Academy (CAMA, 612th Research Institute), and the targeting pod was tasked to the Luoyang Optoelectro Technology Development Center (LOTDC, 613th Research Institute), and the production was tasked to the Factory 624 (Harbin Jiancheng Group). The final product was LS-500J laser-guided bomb, later renamed LT-2 laser-guided bomb for export. LS-500J (LT-2) was one of the most widely used guided bombs in China's arsenal.

Eventually, the original LS-500J branched out to the other series of guided bombs, which were manufactured by different defense factories and institutions:

- The LS (Chinese: 雷石; pinyin: léi shí; lit. 'Thunder Stone') and LT (Chinese: 雷霆; pinyin: léi tíng; lit. 'Thunderclap') series guidance bomb kits, with the LS series focusing on satellite glide bomb, whereas the LT focus on laser guidance, produced by Luoyang Optoelectro Technology Development Center of Aviation Industry Corporation of China (AVIC).
- The FT (Chinese: 飞腾; pinyin: Fēi téng; lit. 'Soaring') series of guided bombs, produced by China Aerospace Science and Technology Corporation (CASC).
- The TG (Chinese: 天戈; pinyin: tiān gē; lit. 'Lambda Boötis'), TD (Chinese: 天罡; pinyin: tiān gāng; lit. 'Big Dipper'), and TL (Chinese: 天雷; pinyin: tiān léi; lit. 'Sky Thunder') series of guided bombs, produced by various subsidiaries of China North Industries Group Corporation, such as Harbin Jiancheng Group.
- The YL (Chinese: 云雷; pinyin: yún léi; lit. 'Cloud Thunder') and YJ (Chinese: 云箭; pinyin: yún jían; lit. 'Cloud Arrow') series of guided bombs, produced by China South Industries Group and marketed via Norinco.
- The YZ series guided bombs, produced by China Aerospace Science and Industry Corporation (CASIC).

=== YL and YJ series ===
In Zhuhai Airshow 2012, China South Industries Group revealed Yunlei / YL (Chinese: 云雷; pinyin: yún léi; lit. 'Cloud Thunder') and Yunjian / YJ (Chinese: 云箭; pinyin: yún jían; lit. 'Cloud Arrow') series of guided bombs. The Yunlei series was showcased again in 2016.

Variants of the series include CS/BBF1 (YL-3) 250 kg (550 lb) thermobaric guided bomb, CS/BBE2 (YL-10) 50 kg (110 lb) blast fragmentation bomb, CS/BBE3 (YL-15) 25 kg (55 lb) laser-guided bomb, CS/BBM1 (YL-13) 100 kg (220 lb) laser-guided bomb, CS/BBM2 (YL-14) 100 kg (220 lb) satellite-guided glide bomb, CS/BBM3 (YL-12) 50 kg (110 lb) satellite-guided bomb, CS/BBC5 (YJ-6) 500 kg (1,100 lb) guided munition dispenser, CS/BBC7 (YJ-7) 50 kg (110 lb) guided cluster bomb.

The CS/BBC5 cargo bomb (also known as the YJ-6 Chinese: 云箭-6; lit. 'Cloud Arrow-6'; not to be confused with the YJ-6 anti-ship missile) can carry sub-munitions or a unitary warhead. It's designed as a stand-off weapon and is fire-and-forget. The bomb weighs 500 kg (1,100 lb). The CS/BBC5 (YJ-6) is similar to the TL500 (GB6) munition dispensers, and two weapons could be closely related, or the same weapons' respective domestic and export version. During a showcase by Chinese state-owned China Central Television (CCTV) in 2020, the CS/BBC5 (YJ-6) was shown to have six tail strakes for increased aerodynamic control. In contrast, the older TL500 (GB6) dispenser only has four tail edges. According to the manufacturer representative, CS/BBC6 (YJ-6) can carry 240 submunitions in six variants, such as anti-armor submunition with 200 mm (7.9 in) penetration, area denial submunition mines with proximity/timed fuses, and carbon fiber submunitions.

== Variants ==
Guided bomb variants produced by China South Industries Group include:

CS/BBF1 (YL-3)
250 kg (550 lb) thermobaric bomb.
YL-5 (YJ-1000-1)
laser-guided 1,000 kg (2,200 lb) bunker buster bomb with high-explosive penetrator warhead. Initially known as the YL-5, but was later renamed to YJ-1000-1. Launched from a JH-7A2 aircraft.
CS/BBD3 (YL-8)
laser-guided 250 kg (550 lb) bomb.
CS/BBE2 (YL-10)
50 kg (110 lb) blast fragmentation bomb.
CS/BBM3 (YL-12)
satellite / laser-guided 50 kg (110 lb) bomb.
CS/BBM1 (YL-13)
laser-guided 100 kg (220 lb) bomb.
CS/BBM2 (YL-14)
satellite-guided 100 kg (220 lb) satellite-guided glide bomb. It's analogous to the GBU-39 Small Diameter Bomb (SDB).
YL-16
100 kg (220 lb) blast fragmentation bomb.
YL-18
aerial bomb.
CS/BBC2 (YJ-1C)
250 kg (550 lb) blockade cluster bomb.
CS/BBC5 (YJ-6)
satellite-guided 500 kg (1,100 lb) munition dispenser. Closely related to TL500 (GB6) airborne munitions dispenser. The Chinese equivalent of AGM-154 Joint Standoff Weapon.
CS/BBC7 (YJ-7)
50 kg (110 lb) cluster bomb.
CS/BBE3 (YJ-15A)
laser-guided 25 kg (55 lb) bomb.

== Operators ==
- China: People's Liberation Army
  - People's Liberation Army Air Force

== See also ==
- FT series, comparable guided bombs developed by CASC.
- TG/GB series, comparable guided bombs produced by China North Industries Group.
- Paveway
- Joint Direct Attack Munition
- AGM-154 Joint Standoff Weapon
