= YZ PGB =

- Type: Precision-guided bomb
- Place of origin: China

Service history
- In service: 2010—present
- Used by: China

Production history
- Manufacturer: China Aerospace Science and Industry Corporation (CASIC)
- Produced: 2010—present

Specifications
- Mass: depends on model
- Length: depends on model
- Height: depends on model
- Diameter: depends on model
- Wingspan: depends on model
- Warhead: various gravity bombs
- Detonation mechanism: Impact / Proximity
- Operational range: depends on the altitude released
- Maximum speed: freefall
- Guidance system: inertial navigation, laser guidance, satellite guidance
- Launch platform: aerial platforms

YZ is a series of precision-guided munitions (PGM) developed by China Aerospace Science and Industry Corporation (CASIC).

== Development ==
=== Background ===
The Chinese development of the precision-guided bomb began in the 1970s after the Chinese military observed the American usage of Paveway in the Vietnam War. Factory 624, later known as the Harbin Jiancheng Group, a subsidiary of Norinco, began the development process in 1974, with prototypes completed in 1980. Between 1984 and 1985, the guided bomb was tested via ground laser designation, while in 1986, the bomb was tested with an aerial laser targeting pod prototype. Prototypes were tested on the H-5 bomber. The project was canceled in the late 1980s due to budgetary issues. The prototype guided bomb in the canceled project was designated Type 7712.

A new laser-guided bomb project was initiated in 1992 after Chinese observation of the Gulf War. This project received more budgetary, human, and political resources. The bomb system was tasked to the Luoyang-based China Airborne Missile Academy (CAMA, 612th Research Institute), and the targeting pod was tasked to the Luoyang Optoelectro Technology Development Center (LOTDC, 613th Research Institute), and the production was tasked to the Factory 624 (Harbin Jiancheng Group). The final product was LS-500J laser-guided bomb, later renamed LT-2 laser-guided bomb for export. LS-500J (LT-2) was one of the most widely used guided bombs in China's arsenal.

Eventually, the original LS-500J branched out to the other series of guided bombs, which were manufactured by different defense factories and institutions:

- The LS (Chinese: 雷石; pinyin: léi shí; lit. 'Thunder Stone') and LT (Chinese: 雷霆; pinyin: léi tíng; lit. 'Thunderclap') series guidance bomb kits, with the LS series focusing on satellite glide bomb, whereas the LT focus on laser guidance, produced by Luoyang Optoelectro Technology Development Center of Aviation Industry Corporation of China (AVIC).
- The FT (Chinese: 飞腾; pinyin: Fēi téng; lit. 'Soaring') series of guided bombs, produced by China Aerospace Science and Technology Corporation (CASC).
- The TG (Chinese: 天戈; pinyin: tiān gē; lit. 'Lambda Boötis'), TD (Chinese: 天罡; pinyin: tiān gāng; lit. 'Big Dipper'), and TL (Chinese: 天雷; pinyin: tiān léi; lit. 'Sky Thunder') series of guided bombs, produced by various subsidiaries of Norinco, such as Harbin Jiancheng Group.
- The YL (Chinese: 云雷; pinyin: yún léi; lit. 'Cloud Thunder') and YJ (Chinese: 云箭; pinyin: yún jían; lit. 'Cloud Arrow') series of guided bombs, produced by China South Industries Group and marketed via Norinco.
- The YZ-100 and YZ-200 series guided bomb, produced by China Aerospace Science and Industry Corporation (CASIC).

=== YZ-100 series ===
The YZ-100 series debuted at Zhuhai Airshow 2010. In 2012, YZ-100 showcased three different weight class, including 30 kg (66 lb), 50 kg (110 lb), and 100 kg (220 lb).

YZ-100 are cluster bombs with precision-guided sub-munitions, and different guidance systems, such as inertial, satellite, laser, infrared, and millimeter wave radar, can be adopted for each sub-munition.

YZ-102A was showcased with the CAIG Wing Loong drone in Egyptian military service.

=== YZ-200 series ===
The YZ-200 series also debuted at Zhuhai Airshow 2010. One variant within the YZ-200 series is called YZ-212, which is laser-guided. In 2012, YZ-200 showcased three different weight class, including 50 kg (110 lb), 125 kg (276 lb), and 250 kg (550 lb).

== Variants ==
YZ-100
Cluster bombs.
YZ-200
Precision-guided bombs.

== Operators ==
- China: People's Liberation Army
  - People's Liberation Army Air Force
  - People's Liberation Army Navy Air Force
- Egypt: Egyptian Armed Forces
- Pakistan: Pakistan Armed Forces
  - Pakistan Air Force

== See also ==
- CM-506KG, another precision guided bomb developed by CASIC.
