= LS PGB =

Chinese precision bombs

LS
- A model of the LS-6 on display at the Farnborough International Airshow 2010 along with a JF-17 Thunder
- Type: Precision-guided munition, glide bomb
- Place of origin: China

Service history
- In service: 2006–present
- Used by: See § Operators

Production history
- Manufacturer: Luoyang Optoelectro Technology Development Center
- Produced: 2006–present

Specifications
- Mass: 50 kg, 100 kg, 250 kg, 500 kg
- Warhead: Various gravity bombs
- Detonation mechanism: Impact or Proximity
- Maximum speed: Free-fall
- Guidance system: INS with GNSS/laser guidance/scene matching area correlator
- Launch platform: Aircraft

Lei Shi (Chinese: 雷石; pinyin: Léi shí; lit. 'Thunder Stone'), abbreviated as LS, is a series of precision-guided munitions (PGM) developed by Luoyang Optoelectro Technology Development Center (LOTDC), a subsidiary of Aviation Industry Corporation of China (AVIC). Leishi is a type of guidance kit that can modify existing unguided bomb into guided standoff munition.

== Development ==
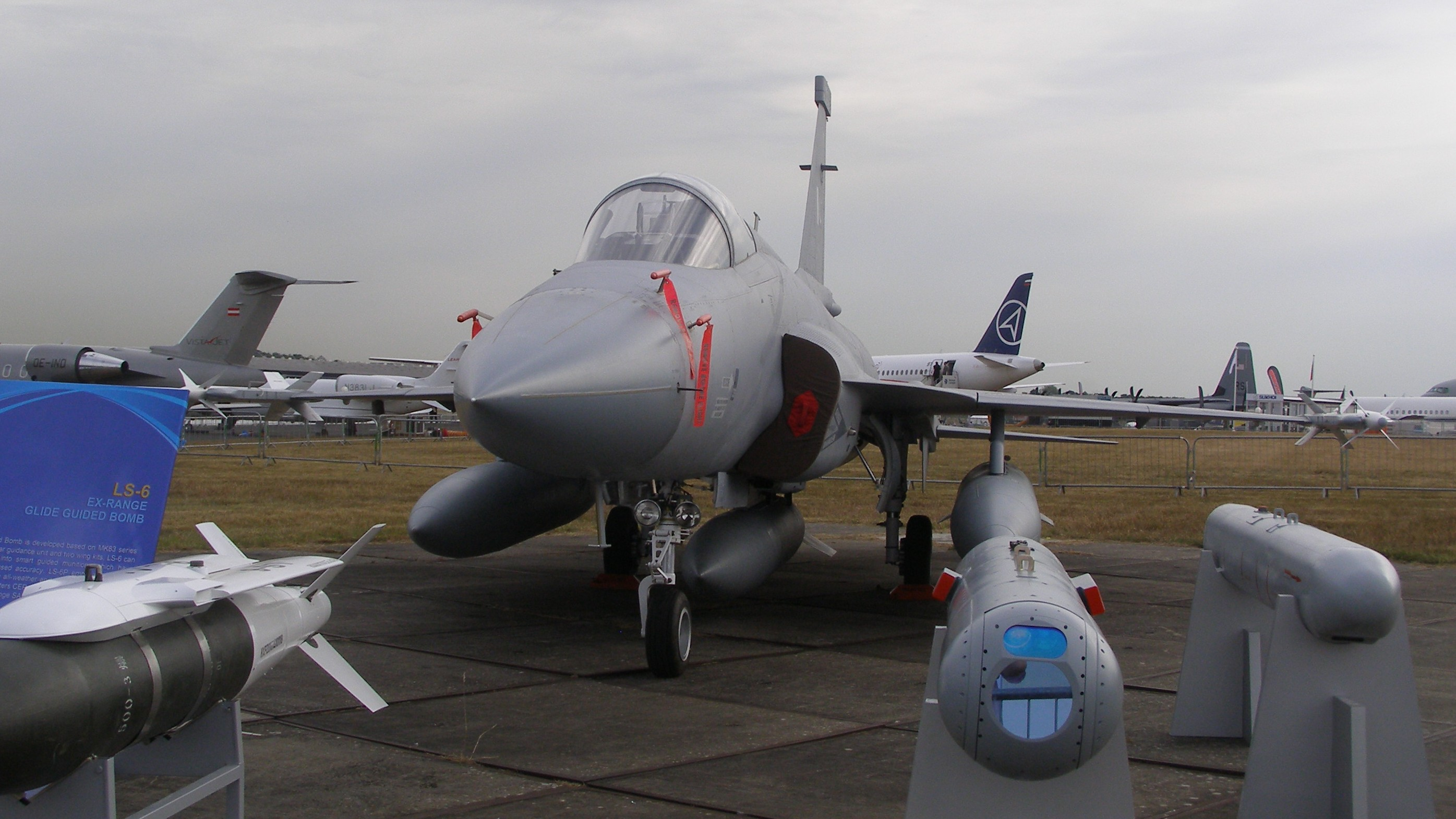
A model of the LS-6 precision-guided glide bomb (left). The folding wings on top of the bomb can be seen, as well as the tail kit, both colored white.

=== Background ===
The Chinese development of the precision-guided bomb began in the 1970s after the Chinese military observed the American usage of Paveway in the Vietnam War. Factory 624, later known as the Harbin Jiancheng Group, a subsidiary of Norinco, began the development process in 1974, with prototypes completed in 1980. Between 1984 and 1985, the guided bomb was tested via ground laser designation, while in 1986, the bomb was tested with an aerial laser targeting pod prototype. Prototypes were tested on the H-5 bomber. The project was canceled in the late 1980s due to budgetary issues. The prototype guided bomb in the canceled project was designated Type 7712.

A new laser-guided bomb project was initiated in 1992 after Chinese observation of the Gulf War. This project received more budgetary, human, and political resources. The bomb system was tasked to the Luoyang-based China Airborne Missile Academy (CAMA, 612th Research Institute), and the targeting pod was tasked to the Luoyang Optoelectro Technology Development Center (LOTDC, 613th Research Institute), and the production was tasked to the Factory 624 (Harbin Jiancheng Group). The final product was LS-500J laser-guided bomb, later renamed LT-2 laser-guided bomb for export. LS-500J (LT-2) was one of the most widely used guided bombs in China's arsenal.

Eventually, the original LS-500J branched out to the other series of guided bombs, which were manufactured by different defense factories and institutions:

- The LS (Chinese: 雷石; pinyin: léi shí; lit. 'Thunder Stone') and LT (Chinese: 雷霆; pinyin: léi tíng; lit. 'Thunderclap') series guidance bomb kits, with the LS series focusing on satellite glide bomb, whereas the LT focus on laser guidance, produced by Luoyang Optoelectro Technology Development Center of Aviation Industry Corporation of China (AVIC).
- The FT (Chinese: 飞腾; pinyin: Fēi téng; lit. 'Soaring') series of guided bombs, produced by China Aerospace Science and Technology Corporation (CASC).
- The TG (Chinese: 天戈; pinyin: tiān gē; lit. 'Lambda Boötis'), TD (Chinese: 天罡; pinyin: tiān gāng; lit. 'Big Dipper'), and TL (Chinese: 天雷; pinyin: tiān léi; lit. 'Sky Thunder') series of guided bombs, produced by various subsidiaries of Norinco, such as Harbin Jiancheng Group.
- The YL (Chinese: 云雷; pinyin: yún léi; lit. 'Cloud Thunder') and YJ (Chinese: 云箭; pinyin: yún jían; lit. 'Cloud Arrow') series of guided bombs, produced by China South Industries Group and marketed via Norinco.
- The YZ series guided bomb, produced by China Aerospace Science and Industry Corporation (CASIC).

=== LS-6 series ===
The LS-6 precision-guided bomb was initially revealed at the 2006 Zhuhai Airshow.

The LS kit is a strap-on upgrade package to provide general-purpose bomb with range extension and precision strike capabilities. The kit consists of two modules: the guidance module and gliding wings. The guidance module includes inertial/satellite guidance, typically mounted in the tail cone of the weapon, and electro-optical seeker with scene matching area correlator or laser guidance seeker, which is mounted at the tip of the bomb. The gliding module, including the folding wings and cruciform tail control surfaces, is made of composite material and comes in different versions for different sizes of gravity bomb, such as 500 kg (1,100 lb), 250 kg (550 lb), 100 kg (220 lb), and 50 kg (110 lb). The range for the 500 kg (1,100 lb) bomb is 60 km (37 mi) at 900 km/h (490 kn) with release attitude of 11 km (36,000 ft). A miniaturized turbojet kit can be mounted at the aft end, boosting LS-6's range to 300 km (190 mi; 160 nmi).

The LS kit series uses the GJV289A standard, the Chinese equivalent of MIL-STD-1553B. The adaptation of such military standards means that the weapon can be readily deployed on any Western platform. The 100 kg (220 lb) and 50 kg (110 lb) variants of the LS-6 are externally similar to the GBU-39 Small Diameter Bomb, which can be carried in the internal weapons bays of stealth fighters such as the Chengdu J-20.

LS-6 munitions were first seen on Serbian MiG-29s in March 2026, around the same time that photographs revealed the integration of CM-400s on the same type of aircraft.

== Variants ==
Type 7712
Prototype laser-guided bomb. Marketed as LT-1 for export by Norinco in the early 1990s. The marketing was halted after the project cancellation.
LS-500J
First generation of the laser-guided bomb. Renamed to LT-2 for export. In PLAAF service, the LS-500J (LT-2) is designated K/YGB500.
LS-6/500
LS-6 glide bomb kit with a pair of horizontal wings mounted on a 500 kg (1,100 lb) unguided bomb. The guidance module consists of GNSS and INS.
LS-6/250
LS-6 glide bomb kit with a pair of horizontal wings mounted on a 250 kg (550 lb) unguided bomb. The guidance module consists of GNSS and INS.
LS-6/100
LS-6 glide bomb with compact control surfaces and a nose-mounted electro-optical seeker mounted on a 100 kg (220 lb) unguided bomb. The guidance module consists of INS and satellite guidance, with either laser-homing or scene-matching area correlator terminal seeker.
LS-6/50
LS-6 glide bomb with compact control surfaces and a nose-mounted electro-optical seeker mounted on a 50 kg (110 lb) unguided bomb. The guidance module consists of INS and satellite guidance, with either laser-homing or scene-matching area correlator terminal seeker.

== Specifications ==
Bomb specifications.
	LS-6/500
Launch mass	Approx. 540 kg (1,190 lb)
Warhead	440 kg (970 lb) HE Blast
Length	Approx. 3.5 m (11 ft)
Diameter	0.377 m (1.24 ft)
Span	Approx. 2.5 m (8.2 ft)
Range	40 km (22 nmi) at 8 km (26,000 ft); 65 km (35 nmi) at 11 km (36,000 ft)
Release altitude	4–11 km (13,000–36,000 ft)
Release speed	600–1,000 km/h (320–540 kn)
Steering	Cruciform trailing edges + folded high-wing
Guidance	GNSS + INS
Accuracy (CEP)	≤15m

== Operators ==
- China: People's Liberation Army
  - People's Liberation Army Air Force
  - People's Liberation Army Navy Air Force
- Serbia: Serbian Air Force - Deployed on MiG-29s in 2026.
- Pakistan: Pakistan Air Force
- Bangladesh: Bangladesh Air Force
- Egypt: Egyptian Air Force - Deployed on MiG-29s in 2026

== See also ==
- LT series, laser-guided bombs developed by AVIC Luoyang
- FT series, comparable glide bombs developed by CASC
- TD series, comparable glide bombs developed by Harbin Jiancheng Group
- Joint Direct Attack Munition
