= AKF-98 =

Chinese anti-ship missile

- Type: Air-launched cruise missile
- Place of origin: People's Republic of China

Service history
- Used by: People's Liberation Army

Specifications
- Mass: Approx. 1,000 kg (2,200 lb)
- Length: Approx. 4 m (13 ft)
- Width: 750 mm (30 in)
- Height: 490 mm (19 in)
- Warhead: Approx. 500 kg (1,100 lb)
- Engine: jet engine
- Propellant: liquid fuel
- Operational range: 500–1,000 km (270–540 nmi)
- Guidance system: GNSS, INS, IIR, TERPROM
- Launch platform: Aerial platforms; Shenyang J-16; Xi'an JH-7A2

AKF-98 (Chinese: AKF-98防区外巡航导弹; pinyin: Jiǔbā Fángqū wài xúnháng dǎodàn; lit. 'Standoff cruise missile') is a stand-off land-attack cruise missile of Chinese origin. It was debuted at Airshow China 2022.

== Development ==
The AKF-98A was displayed at Zhuhai Airshow in 2022. It's a jet-powered stand-off cruise missile carried by fighter aircraft in a similar class to AGM-158 JASSM or Storm Shadow/SCALP-EG. The missile has a stealth enclosure that reduces radar-cross sections. The low observable design features a diamond-shaped nose section and trapezoid body, and a tail section containing two horizontal tailfins and two downward vertical tailfins. The nose contains a terminal seeker that possibly includes imaging infrared (IIR), satellite navigation (GNSS), inertial guidance computers (INS), and a radio altimeter for terrain following.

Two variants of AKF-98A were identified, carried separately by an Xi'an JH-7A2 and a Shenyang J-16. Two missiles feature different body sections, which might carry different types of warheads, such as unitary warheads or submunition dispensers. One variant was also identified with foldable fins, indicating intentions for internal carriage. The bottom of the missile is reportedly where the recessed ventral intake locate.

According to Janes Information Services, Ta Kung Pao, and International Institute for Strategic Studies (IISS), the missile is speculated to have a weight around 1,000 kg (2,200 lb), a length of 4 m (13 ft), a height of 490 mm (19 in), a width of 750 mm (30 in), a range of 500–1,000 km (270–540 nmi), and a warhead payload of 500 kg (1,100 lb).

== Variants ==
AKF-98A
Two variants of the AKF-98A with different missile body and tail design have been identified.
CM-98
Export variant.

== Operators ==
China

- People's Liberation Army Air Force
- People's Liberation Army Naval Air Force

== See also ==
- GB6A
- AGM-158 JASSM
- Apache
- Storm Shadow
- Taurus KEPD 350
