= LT PGB =

Chinese precision-guided bomb

LT Laser-guided bomb
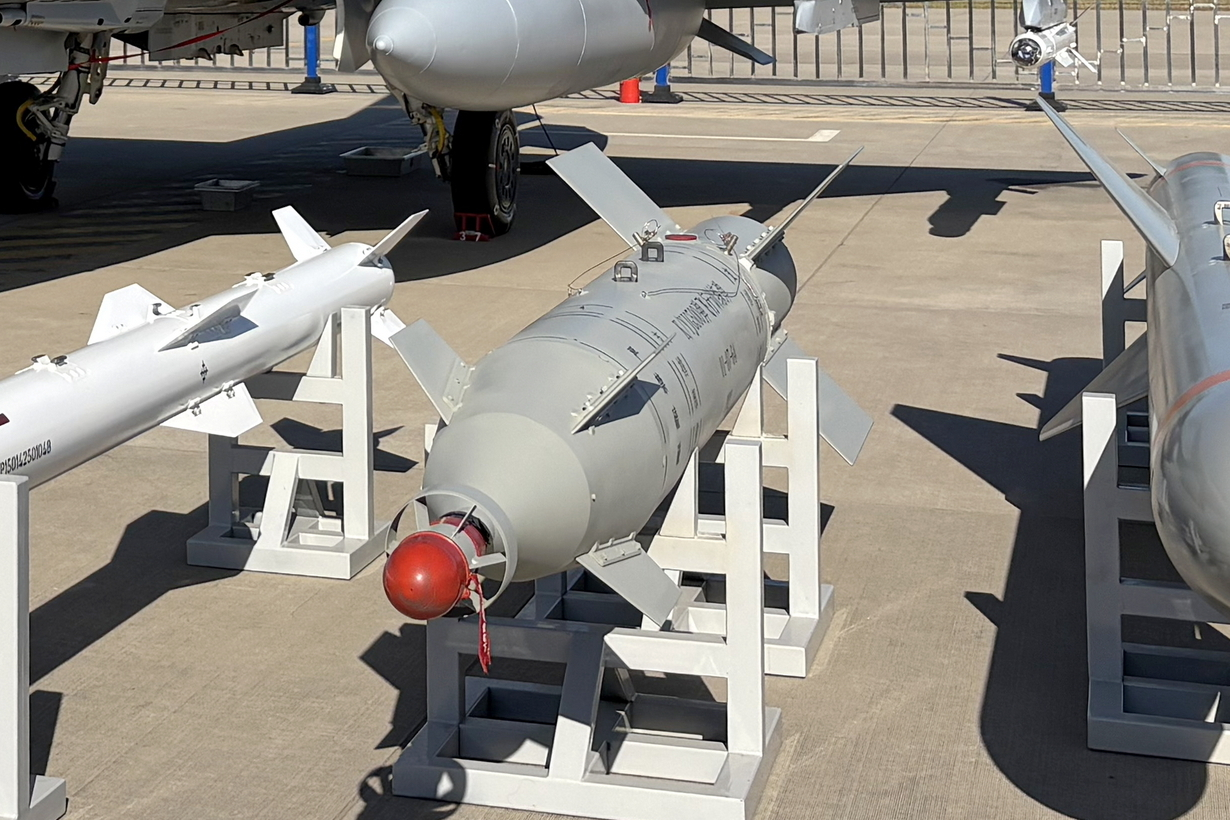
- LT-2 (LS-500J) bomb in front of the Chengdu J-10
- Type: LGB / Precision-guided bomb
- Place of origin: China

Service history
- In service: 2004—present
- Used by: People's Liberation Army Air Force

Production history
- Produced: 2004—present

Specifications
- Mass: 570kg
- Length: 3580mm
- Diameter: 380mm
- Wingspan: 950mm (tail fin)
- Warhead: various gravity bombs
- Detonation mechanism: Impact / Proximity
- Maximum speed: ≥230m/s (at launch)
- Guidance system: laser guidance
- Launch platform: aerial platforms

Lei Ting (Chinese: 雷霆; pinyin: Léi tíng; lit. 'Thunderclap'), abbreviated as LT, is a series of precision-guided munitions (PGM) developed by Luoyang Optoelectro Technology Development Center (LOTDC), a subsidiary of Aviation Industry Corporation of China (AVIC). The first variant, LT-2, was one of the most produced laser-guided bombs in the Chinese military. The role and performance of the Lei Ting series are roughly equivalent to the Paveway.

== Development ==
=== Background ===
The Chinese development of the precision-guided bomb began in the 1970s after the Chinese military observed the American usage of Paveway in the Vietnam War. Factory 624, later known as the Harbin Jiancheng Group, a subsidiary of Norinco, began the development process in 1974, with prototypes completed in 1980. Between 1984 and 1985, the guided bomb was tested via ground laser designation, while in 1986, the bomb was tested with an aerial laser targeting pod prototype. Prototypes were tested on the H-5 bomber. The project was canceled in the late 1980s due to budgetary issues. The canceled guided bomb was called Type 7712.

A new laser-guided bomb project was initiated in 1992 after Chinese observation of the Gulf War. This project received more budgetary, human, and political resources. The bomb system was tasked to the Luoyang-based China Airborne Missile Academy (CAMA, 612th Research Institute), and the targeting pod was tasked to the Luoyang Optoelectro Technology Development Center (LOTDC, 613th Research Institute), and the production was tasked to the Factory 624 (Harbin Jiancheng Group). The final product was LS-500J laser-guided bomb, later renamed LT-2 laser-guided bomb for export. LS-500J (LT-2) was one of the most widely used guided bombs in China's arsenal.

Eventually, the original LS-500J branched out to the other series of guided bombs, which were manufactured by different defense factories and institutions:

- The LS (Chinese: 雷石; pinyin: léi shí; lit. 'Thunder Stone') and LT (Chinese: 雷霆; pinyin: léi tíng; lit. 'Thunderclap') series guidance bomb kits, with the Leishi series focusing on satellite glide bomb, whereas the LT focus on laser guidance, produced by Luoyang Optoelectro Technology Development Center of Aviation Industry Corporation of China (AVIC).
- The FT (Chinese: 飞腾; pinyin: Fēi téng; lit. 'Soaring') series of guided bombs, produced by China Aerospace Science and Technology Corporation (CASC).
- The TG (Chinese: 天戈; pinyin: tiān gē; lit. 'Lambda Boötis'), TD (Chinese: 天罡; pinyin: tiān gāng; lit. 'Big Dipper'), and TL (Chinese: 天雷; pinyin: tiān léi; lit. 'Sky Thunder') series of guided bombs, produced by various subsidiaries of Norinco, such as Harbin Jiancheng Group.
- The YL (Chinese: 云雷; pinyin: yún léi; lit. 'Cloud Thunder') and YJ (Chinese: 云箭; pinyin: yún jían; lit. 'Cloud Arrow') series of guided bombs, produced by China South Industries Group and marketed via Norinco.
- The YZ series guided bomb, produced by China Aerospace Science and Industry Corporation (CASIC).

=== LT series ===
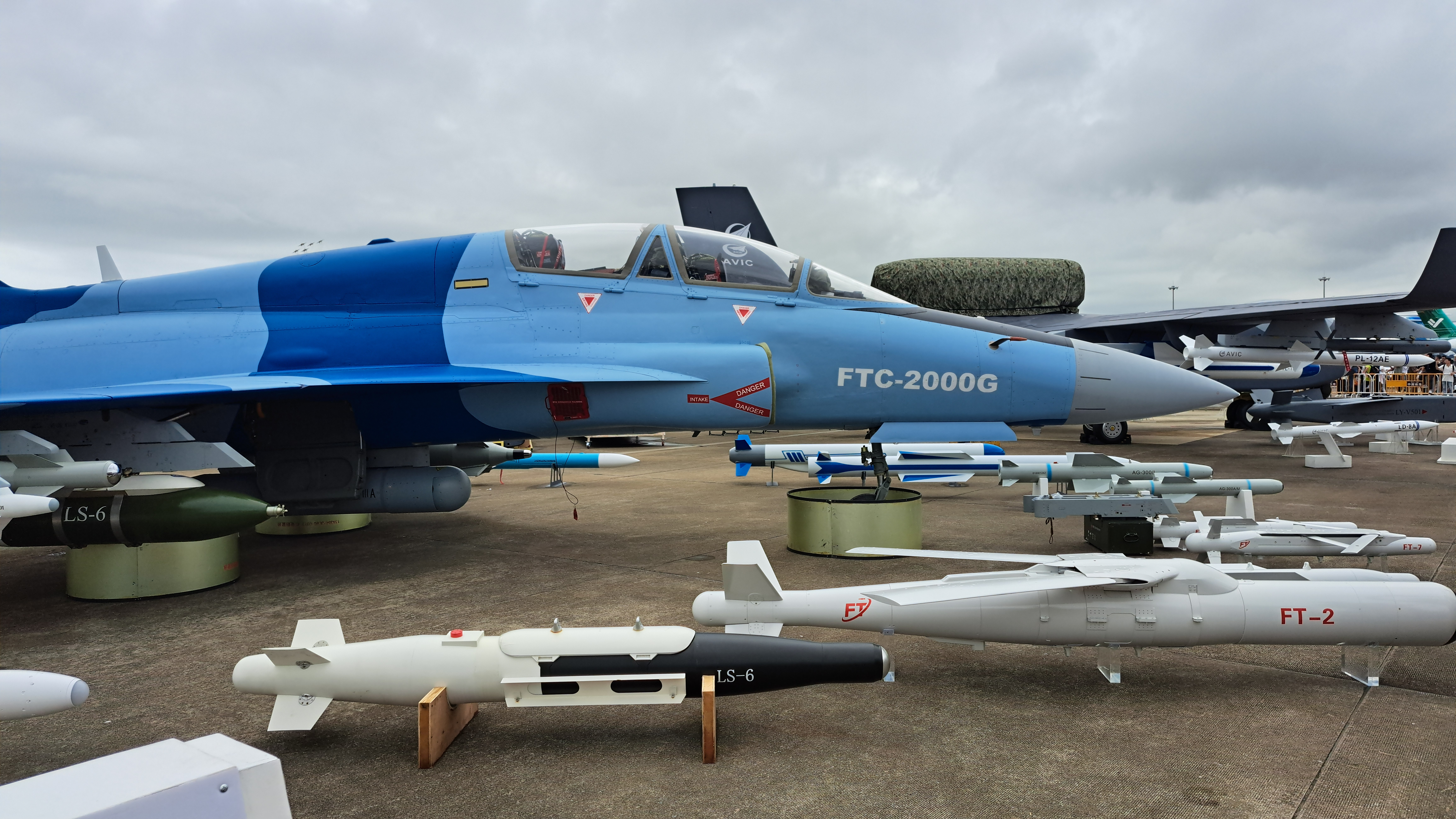
LT-3 (marked as LS-6) bomb (bottom) displayed at Zhuhai Airshow 2024

LT-2 was the first bomb in the LT series, which was renamed from the LS-500J guided bomb. The LT-2 is a strap-on bomb kit that can be mounted on any 500 kg (1,100 lb) class general-purpose bomb. The seeker is an annular airfoil seeker with a quadrant detection assembly similar to that of Paveway I and II. The tail kit is in a similar configuration to the Paveway I. The guidance system is unstabilized in roll, relying on bang–bang control like the Paveway II, and the cruciform tail assembly provides maneuverability.

LT-3 is a sophisticated upgrade of LT-2. The LT-3 has a dual-mode seeker, combining a satellite / inertial guidance tail kit with a gimbaled laser guidance module. Weighing 564 kg (1,243 lb) and ranging 24 km (13 nmi), the warhead can penetrate 1.5 meters thick reinforced concrete. The mounting bracket and tail structure of the LT-3 is derived from the LS-6 250kg version, though the two bombs have different guidance methods and masses. The concept of the LT-3 is very close to the Paveway III or GBU-55 Laser JDAM. According to the Industry Corporation of China (AVIC) representative at Zhuhai Airshow 2008, the upgrade was substantial. The LT-3 uses a wide field-of-view (FOV) laser beam-riding gimbal, similar to Paveway III. In contrast, the older LT-2 relies on the bang–bang control system that was common in the 1960s on bombs such as Paveway I.

== Targeting pod ==
In the 1990s, multiple targeting pods were developed for the laser-guided bombs. One of the earliest types was called Blue Sky (Chinese: 蓝天; pinyin: Lán tiān), and was publicly revealed in the late 1990s. The Blue Sky targeting pod is externally similar to the American LANTIRN. The targeting range for LT-2 is 15 km (8.1 nmi). Alternatively, LT PGB can be guided by forward-looking targeting pods, such as FILAT.

== Variants ==
There are several variants in the LT family:

- LT-1 (Type 7712): Prototype guided bomb. Marketed as LT-1 for export by Norinco in the early 1990s. The marketing was halted after the project cancellation.
- LT-2: Laser-guided 500 kg (1,100 lb) bombs, originally called LS-500J. In PLAAF service, LS-500J (LT-2) is designated K/YGB500.
- LT-3: Laser + satellite / inertial navigation dual moddule guided 500 kg (1,100 lb) bombs with a wide FOV seeker, incorporating technologies from LS-6 series.

== Specifications ==
Bomb specifications.
	LT-1 (Type 7712)	LT-2 (LS-500J)	GB1 (GB500)	LT-3
Launch mass	498 kg (1,098 lb)	570 kg (1,260 lb)	572 kg (1,261 lb)	564 kg (1,243 lb)
Warhead			280 kg (620 lb)	
Length	4.68 m (15.4 ft)	3.53 m (11.6 ft)	3.5 m (11 ft)	3.58 m (11.7 ft)
Diameter	0.37 m (1.2 ft)	0.377 m (1.24 ft)	0.38 m (1.2 ft)	0.38 m (1.2 ft)
Span		0.95 m (3.1 ft)	0.55 m (1.8 ft)	0.95 m (3.1 ft)
Range		10 km (5.4 nmi)	8 km (4.3 nmi)	24 km (13 nmi)
Release altitude	0.9–7 km (3,000–23,000 ft)		5–10 km (16,000–33,000 ft)	
Seeker design	Annular airfoil with flexible mount (Gen 1)	Annular airfoil with flexible mount (Gen 1)	Gyrostabilized proportional navigation (Gen 2)	Gimballed scan array (Gen 3)
Seeker FOV	25°	25°		
Seeker range	4 km (2.2 nmi)	7–15 km (3.8–8.1 nmi)		
Guidance	SAL	SAL	SAL	GNSS + INS + SAL
Steering	Cruciform trailing edges			
Accuracy (CEP)	≤5m	≤5m (ground) ≤6.5m (air)	≤3m (ground) ≤5m (air)	≤3m

== Operator ==
- China: People's Liberation Army
  - People's Liberation Army Air Force
  - People's Liberation Army Navy Air Force

== See also ==
- LS-6, glide bombs also developed by AVIC Luoyang
- TG/GB series, laser-guided bombs developed by Haribin Jiancheng Group, successor to the LS-500J (LT-2)
- Paveway / Paveway III
- GBU-55 LJDAM
