= TG PGB =

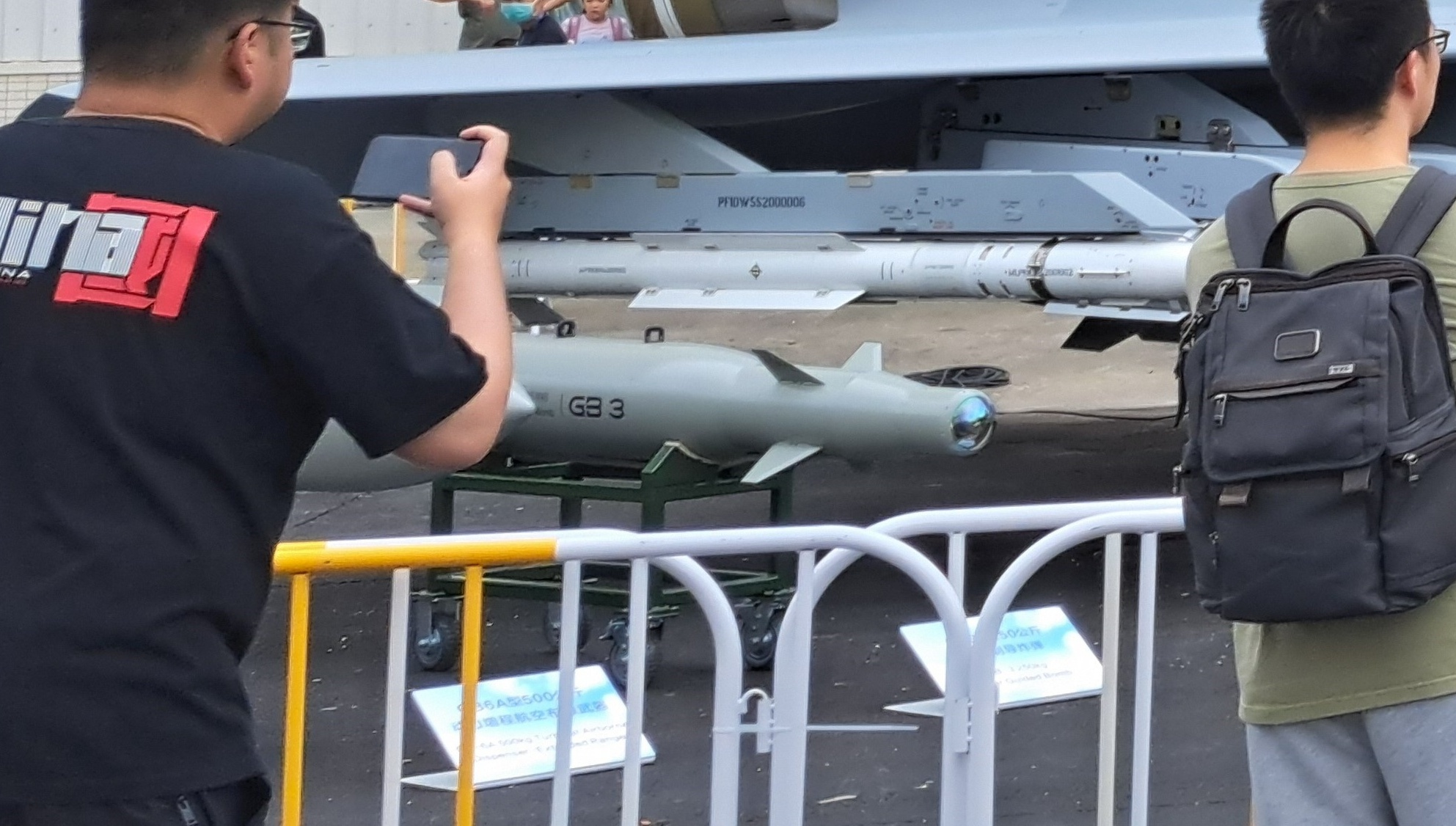
- GB3 (GB250) bomb displayed at Zhuhai Airshow
- Type: Precision-guided bomb
- Place of origin: China

Service history
- In service: 2006—present
- Used by: China

Production history
- Manufacturer: Harbin Jiancheng Group
- Produced: 2006—present

Specifications
- Mass: up to 1,000 kg (2,200 lb)
- Length: depends on model
- Height: depends on model
- Diameter: depends on model
- Wingspan: depends on model
- Warhead: various gravity bombs
- Detonation mechanism: Impact / Proximity
- Operational range: depends on the altitude released
- Maximum speed: freefall
- Guidance system: inertial navigation, laser guidance, satellite guidance
- Launch platform: aerial platforms

Tian Ge (Chinese: 天戈; pinyin: tiān gē; lit. 'Lambda Boötis'), abbreviated as TG or GB, is a series of precision-guided munitions (PGM) developed by Harbin Jiancheng Group, a subsidiary of China North Industries Group Corporation (Norinco).

== Development ==
=== Background ===
The Chinese development of the precision-guided bomb began in the 1970s after the Chinese military observed the American usage of Paveway in the Vietnam War. Factory 624, later known as the Harbin Jiancheng Group, a subsidiary of Norinco, began the development process in 1974, with prototypes completed in 1980. Between 1984 and 1985, the guided bomb was tested via ground laser designation, while in 1986, the bomb was tested with an aerial laser targeting pod prototype. Prototypes were tested on the H-5 bomber. The project was canceled in the late 1980s due to budgetary issues. The prototype guided bomb in the canceled project was designated Type 7712.

A new laser-guided bomb project was initiated in 1992 after Chinese observation of the Gulf War. This project received more budgetary, human, and political resources. The bomb system was tasked to the Luoyang-based China Airborne Missile Academy (CAMA, 612th Research Institute), and the targeting pod was tasked to the Luoyang Optoelectro Technology Development Center (LOTDC, 613th Research Institute), and the production was tasked to the Factory 624 (Harbin Jiancheng Group). The final product was LS-500J laser-guided bomb, later renamed LT-2 laser-guided bomb for export. LS-500J (LT-2) was one of the most widely used guided bombs in China's arsenal.

Eventually, the original LS-500J branched out to the other series of guided bombs, which were manufactured by different defense factories and institutions:

- The LS (Chinese: 雷石; pinyin: léi shí; lit. 'Thunder Stone') and LT (Chinese: 雷霆; pinyin: léi tíng; lit. 'Thunderclap') series guidance bomb kits, with the LS series focusing on satellite glide bomb, whereas the LT focus on laser guidance, produced by Luoyang Optoelectro Technology Development Center of Aviation Industry Corporation of China (AVIC).
- The FT (Chinese: 飞腾; pinyin: Fēi téng; lit. 'Soaring') series of guided bombs, produced by China Aerospace Science and Technology Corporation (CASC).
- The TG (Chinese: 天戈; pinyin: tiān gē; lit. 'Lambda Boötis'), TD (Chinese: 天罡; pinyin: tiān gāng; lit. 'Big Dipper'), and TL (Chinese: 天雷; pinyin: tiān léi; lit. 'Sky Thunder') series of guided bombs, produced by various subsidiaries of China North Industries Group Corporation, such as Harbin Jiancheng Group.
- The YL (Chinese: 云雷; pinyin: yún léi; lit. 'Cloud Thunder') and YJ (Chinese: 云箭; pinyin: yún jían; lit. 'Cloud Arrow') series of guided bombs, produced by China South Industries Group and marketed via Norinco.
- The YZ series guided bomb, produced by China Aerospace Science and Industry Corporation (CASIC).

=== TG/GB series ===
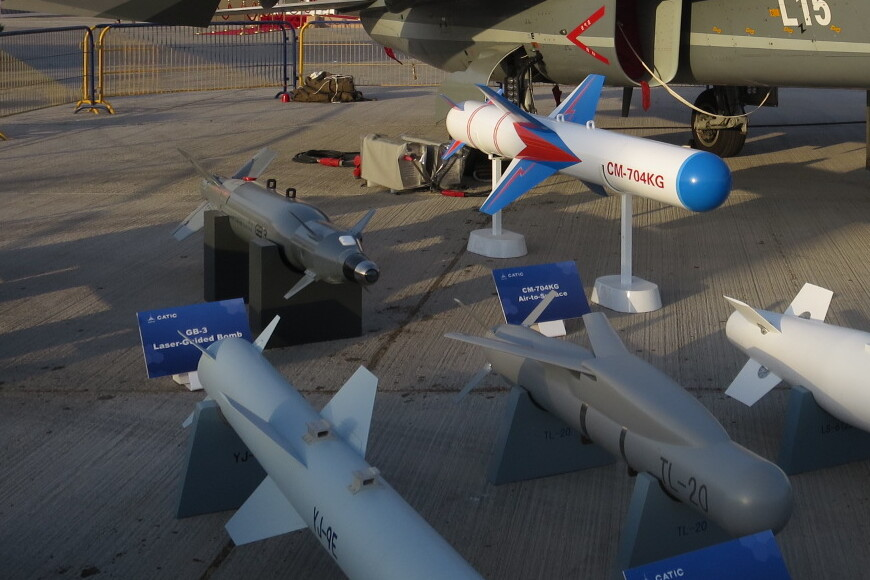
GB3 (GB250) bomb (top-left) displayed at the Dubai Air Show 2021

GB1 is the second-generation laser-guided bomb with a design based on LS-500J (LT-2). Unlike LS-500J (LT-2), it has a proportional navigation seeker that is gyrostabilized. The new seeker provides GB1 with a longer detection range and a wider field of view. GB1 was revealed at Zhuhai Airshow 2008 and was expanded into a series of bombs with different sizes. The series was renamed at Zhuhai Airshow 2012 as the Tian Ge (Chinese: 天戈; pinyin: tiān gē; lit. 'Lambda Boötis') series, which included TG100, TG250, TG500, and TG1000, corresponding to their mass. The GB1 was renamed TG500. TG series bombs can also be mounted with glide wings, which are denoted with the ER suffix. At Zhuhai Airshow 2014, TG series was renamed again to be GB series, with TG500, TG100 becoming GB500, GB100, etc. Later variants of the GB series bomb, such as GB25, GB50, GB100 and GB1000, has third- and fourth-generation gimbaled seeker with dual model guidance module, combining laser with satellite / inertial navigation.

Tiange bomb designations
Original (2008)	GB1							
TG series (2012)	TG500	Tiangang(TD500)-ER	TG250	TG250-ER	TG100	TG1000	Tianlei(TL)500	TG50
GB series (2014)	GB500	GB2A	GB250 (GB3)	GB250A (GB3A)	GB100 (GB4)	GB1000 (GB5)	GB6	GB50 (GB7)
Bomb class	500 kg (1,100 lb)		250 kg (550 lb)		100 kg (220 lb)	1,000 kg (2,200 lb)	500 kg (1,100 lb)	50 kg (110 lb)

The GB series bombs are deployed by the People's Liberation Army Air Force (PLAAF).

The GB500 bomb in PLAAF service is designated K/YGB500B. The predecessor, LS-500J (LT-2) is designated K/YGB500.

=== TD series ===
At the Zhuhai Airshow 2012, Harbin Jiancheng Group also revealed Tiangang (Chinese: 天罡; pinyin: tiān gāng; lit. 'Big Dipper') series bombs, abbreviated as the TD series. TD series bombs can also be mounted with glide wings, which are denoted with the ER suffix. TD series are satellite-guided bombss, with options to fit panel wing-glider, similar to the roles and performance of the LS-6 series.

=== TL series ===
At the Zhuhai Airshow 2012, Harbin Jiancheng Group also revealed Tianlei (Chinese: 天雷; pinyin: tiān léi; lit. 'Sky Thunder') series bombs, specifically the TL500, a 500 kg (1,100 lb) airborne munitions dispensers. In 2014, the weapon was renamed as the GB6 or Tianlei-1 (TL-1). Tianlei series bombs are multi-purpose airborne munitions dispensers with glide wings, which serves as a universal platform with customizable payloads, including various types of submunutions. The TL500 has a cube-shaped stealth enclosure that reduces radar cross section (RCS) and increasing internal volume for payload, a launch mass of 500 kg (1,100 lb), and a reported range of more than 60 km (37 mi; 32 nmi) or 80 mi (130 km; 70 nmi).

Each dispenser contains 240 submunitions and has an effective area of 6,000 m^{2} (65,000 sq ft). Six variants of submunitions are available, including armor-penetrating submunitions for attacking armored columns, anti-runway submunitions that create bulges and pits on the targeted surface and serves as mines to delay repair, area blockade submunitions with fuzed acoustic and optical sensors targeting infrastructures, fuel air explosive submunitions for cleaning out minefields, combined effect submunitions with both armor-piercing and incendiary effect, and self-propelled loitering submunitions containing reconnaissance and transmission equipment. Submunitions can be loaded in separate bombs or mixed together in a single bomb. Aside from carrying submunitions, TL500 can also load supplies or distribute leaflets.

TL500 is the same or very similar to the K/YBS500 multi-purpose airborne munitions dispensers in the People's Liberation Army service, which is also developed by the 624th Factory (Harbin Jiancheng Group) of Norinco. The TL500 and the Chinese service variants are capable of all-weather operations, autonomous flight, smart target acquisition, and long-range strike. Overall, the capabilities of the TL500 is similar to the AGM-154A-1 Joint Stand-Off Weapon (JSOW).

The TL500 (GB6) is also similar to the CS/BBC5 (YJ-6), which is shown to have six tail strakes. In contrast, the TL500 (GB6) dispenser only has four tail edges. The CS/BBC5 (YJ-6) is reportedly a newer design.

The Tianlei-2 (TL-2) or GB6A variant was showcased at Zhuhai Airshow 2016, which is a GB6 guided bomb fitted with a miniature turbojet engine. The jet engine provides extended range and offering capabilities similar to that of Storm Shadow and Taurus KEPD 350. GB6A (TL-2) has two engine options, a solid rocket booster for more than 150 km (81 nmi) of range, and a turbojet engine for more than 280 km (150 nmi) of range. The guidance system and warhead customization options are similar to that of GB6.

=== TJ series ===
Harbin Jiancheng Group also produces guided modules for the rocket. The Tianjian (Chinese: 天箭; pinyin: tiān jiàn; lit. 'Sky Arrow') 90 mm (3.5 in) rocket debuted on Zhuhai Airshow 2012. The rocket has the provision for guided seekers. The guided rocket was designated BRM-1. The BRM-1 weighs 16.8–25 kg (37–55 lb), has a warhead of 4.8–5.6 kg (11–12 lb) with 1.3 kg (2.9 lb) TH50-50 high explosives. The range of the rocket is 8 km (4.3 nmi), and it uses semi-active laser guidance. The weapon can be fired in a salvo of 7 on the HF-7 launcher or a salvo of 20 on the HF-20 launcher.

== Variants ==
Guided bomb variants produced by Harbin Jiancheng Group include:

TG500/GB500/GB1
laser-guided 500 kg (1,100 lb) bomb, the original variant with a second-generation seeker. SAL guidance.
TG250/GB250/GB3
laser-guided 250 kg (550 lb) bomb, the original variant with a second-generation seeker, dual mode guidance with INS / GNSS + SAL.
TG250-ER/GB250A/GB3A
laser-guided 250 kg (550 lb) glide bomb, it's a GB250 bomb fitted with additional gliding wings. Dual mode guidance with INS / GNSS + SAL.
TG100/GB100/GB4
laser-guided 100 kg (220 lb) bomb, the updated variant with a newer generation seeker, dual mode guidance with INS / GNSS + SAL.
TG1000/GB1000/GB5
laser-guided 1,000 kg (2,200 lb) bomb, updated variant with a newer generation seeker, dual mode guidance with INS / GNSS + SAL.
TG50/GB50/GB7
laser-guided 50 kg (110 lb) bomb, updated variant with a newer generation seeker, dual mode guidance with INS / GNSS + SAL.
TG25/GB25
laser-guided bomb, updated variant with a newer generation seeker, dual mode guidance with INS / GNSS + SAL.
TD500-ER/GB2A
satellite-guided 500 kg (1,100 lb) glide bomb, INS / GNSS + SAL terminal guidance.
TL-1/TL500/GB6
satellite-guided 500 kg (1,100 lb) multi-purpose airborne munitions dispensers.
TL-2/GB6A
satellite-guided 500 kg (1,100 lb) multi-purpose airborne munitions dispensers with turbojet engine. Cruise missile.

== Specifications ==
Bomb specifications
	GB500/GB1	GB2A	GB250/GB3	GB250A/GB3A	GB100/GB4	GB1000/GB5	GB50/GB7	GB25
Launch mass	572 kg (1,261 lb)		260 kg (570 lb)	275 kg (606 lb)	130 kg (290 lb)	1,050 kg (2,310 lb)		
Warhead	280 kg (620 lb)		90 kg (200 lb)		44 kg (97 lb)	210 kg (460 lb) PBX (GB5-I); 420 kg (930 lb) (GB5-II)	10 kg (22 lb)	3 kg (6.6 lb)
Length	3.5 m (11 ft)	3.4 m (11 ft)	3 m (9.8 ft)		2.35 m (7.7 ft)	4.15–4.75 m (13.6–15.6 ft)	1.6 m (5.2 ft)	1.3 m (4.3 ft)
Diameter	0.38 m (1.2 ft)	0.38 m (1.2 ft)	0.3 m (0.98 ft)		0.23 m (0.75 ft)	0.377–0.457 m (1.24–1.50 ft)	0.13 m (0.43 ft)	0.13 m (0.43 ft)
Span	0.55 m (1.8 ft)	3.15 m (10.3 ft)	0.68 m (2.2 ft)		0.95 m (3.1 ft)	1.659 m (5.44 ft)	0.42 m (1.4 ft)	0.34 m (1.1 ft)
Range	8 km (4.3 nmi)	80 km (43 nmi)	20 km (11 nmi)	80 km (43 nmi)	15–30 km (8.1–16.2 nmi)	25 km (13 nmi)	10–25 km (5.4–13.5 nmi)	
Release altitude	5–10 km (16,000–33,000 ft)	3–12 km (9,800–39,400 ft)				4–15 km (13,000–49,000 ft)		
Seeker	gyrostabilized proportional navigation (Gen 2)	N/A	gyrostabilized proportional navigation (Gen 2)		Gimballed scan array (Gen 3/4)			
Guidance	SAL	GNSS	INS + GNSS + SAL					
Steering	Cruciform trailing edges	Cruciform trailing edges + Panel wings	Cruciform trailing edges	Cruciform trailing edges + Panel wings	Cruciform trailing edges			
Accuracy (CEP)	≤3m (ground) ≤5m (air)	≤15m	≤4m		≤3m			

== Operators ==
- China: People's Liberation Army
  - People's Liberation Army Air Force
  - People's Liberation Army Navy Air Force
- Pakistan: Pakistan Armed Forces
  - Pakistan Air Force
- Myanmar
- Rapid Support Forces

== See also ==
- LT series, comparable laser-guided bombs by Luoyang AVIC.
- LS-6, comparable glide bombs developed by Luoyang AVIC.
- FT series, comparable glide bombs developed by CASC.
- YL series, comparable guided bombs produced by China South Industries Group.
- Paveway II / Paveway III / Paveway IV
- GBU-54/56 LJDAM
