= JL-10A =

Type of aircraft radar

The JL-10A airborne radar is a highly digitized pulse-Doppler radar with slotted planar array developed for the People's Liberation Army Air Force (PLAAF) as a replacement for the older Type 232H radar employed by the Chinese air force. The radar is built to MIL-STD-1553 standard so it is compatible with western electronics and weaponry. Originally, the radar is capable of simultaneously tracking 10 targets (later to be upgraded to 15) and engaging 2 (later to be upgraded to 6) of the 10 tracked when using semi-active radar homing air-to-air missiles, or 4 of the 10 tracked when using active radar homing air-to-air missiles.

A version of JL-10A

Although the radar has the terrain following and terrain avoidance capabilities, they are rarely used, instead, it is compatible with navigational pods such as the Chinese Blue Sky low altitude navigation pod that enable the aircraft to have these two capabilities. The reason for using navigational pod with terrain following / avoidance radar in conjunction with JL-10A is to have a dedicated terrain following / avoidance mode purely for low level flight, while the fire control modes are continuous and separated from navigational modes such terrain following /avoidance, so that JL-10A would constantly stay at fire control modes instead of switching between terrain following / avoidance modes and other modes of operation. Unlike the much more advanced electronically scanned phased array airborne radars with each scan lasts only milliseconds, the JL-10A is a slotted planar array radar with each scan last from several seconds to a dozen seconds or greater, switching between different operational modes would take too long and thus deemed unacceptable under intense combat situations, so it would be far better to stay in the same operational mode to avoid any interruption under these situations. Reportedly, the terrain following / avoidance technology of JL-10A was developed from those originally obtained from captured terrain following radars from downed A-6 Intruders and General Dynamics F-111s during the Vietnam War.

In 2001, JL-10A achieved a 32:1 DBS (Doppler beam sharpening) capability, but it still lagged behind the 48:1 DBS capability of AN/APG-66, and it was not several years later when the JL-10A was finally upgraded with 64:1 DBS capability like that of AN/APG-68. Around the same time, JL-10A was also upgraded with the capability to simultaneously track 15 targets and engage 6 of the 15 tracked targets. By 2004, SAR capability was incorporated, and inverse SAR (ISAR) capability is reportedly under development.

The radar has been tested and installed on JH-7A Flying Leopard fighter-bombers and is capable of launching a scope of weapons including the C-802 anti-ship missile and the Russian Kh-31.

Specification:

- Frequency: X band
- Maximum detection range: 104 km
- Maximum look-up tracking range: 80 km
- Maximum look-down tracking range: 54 km
- Maximum look-up engagement range: 40 km
- Maximum look-down engagement range: 32 km
- Total modes of operation: 11
- Sector of scan: +/- 60 degrees
- Maximum targets tracked: 15
- Maximum targets engaged: 6
- Developer: CLETRI (607th Institute)
