= China International Aviation & Aerospace Exhibition =

Biennial military and civil aircraft exhibition

- Status: Active
- Genre: Air show
- Dates: November
- Frequency: Biennial: Even years
- Venue: Zhuhai Jinwan Airport
- Locations: Zhuhai, Guangdong
- Coordinates: 22°00′25″N 113°22′34″E
- Country: China
- Established: 1996; 30 years ago
- Most recent: 2024
- Next event: 2026
- Major events: Aerobatic displays
- Organizer: Zhuhai Airshow Co., Ltd.
- Website: airshow.com.cn

China International Aviation & Aerospace Exhibition
- Simplified Chinese: 中国国际航空航天博览会
- Traditional Chinese: 中國國際航空航天博覽會
Transcriptions
Standard Mandarin
- Hanyu Pinyin: Zhōngguó Guójì Hángkōng Hángtiān Bólǎnhuì
Yue: Cantonese
- Jyutping: zung1 gwok3 gwok3 zai3 hong4 hung1 hong4 tin1 bok3 laam5 wui6*2

Airshow China
- Simplified Chinese: 中国航展
- Traditional Chinese: 中國航展
Transcriptions
Standard Mandarin
- Hanyu Pinyin: Zhōngguó Hángzhǎn
Yue: Cantonese
- Jyutping: zung1 gwok3 hong4 zin2

Zhuhai Airshow
- Chinese: 珠海航展
Transcriptions
Standard Mandarin
- Hanyu Pinyin: Zhūhǎi Hángzhǎn
Yue: Cantonese
- Jyutping: zyu1 hoi2 hong4 zin2

China International Aviation & Aerospace Exhibition (中国国际航空航天博览会), also known as the Airshow China (中国航展) and Zhuhai Airshow (珠海航展), is a biennial international aerospace trade expo held in Zhuhai, Guangdong, since 1996. It is the largest airshow in China.

The show typically features aerobatics displays, especially by the August 1st team of the People's Liberation Army Air Force, Russian Knights, and Surya Kiran. It has also displayed elements of the Chinese space program, such as a flown Mengzhou capsule, Moon rocks retrieved by the Chinese Lunar Exploration Program, and future models of the Long March rocket family and Tiangong space station.

== History ==
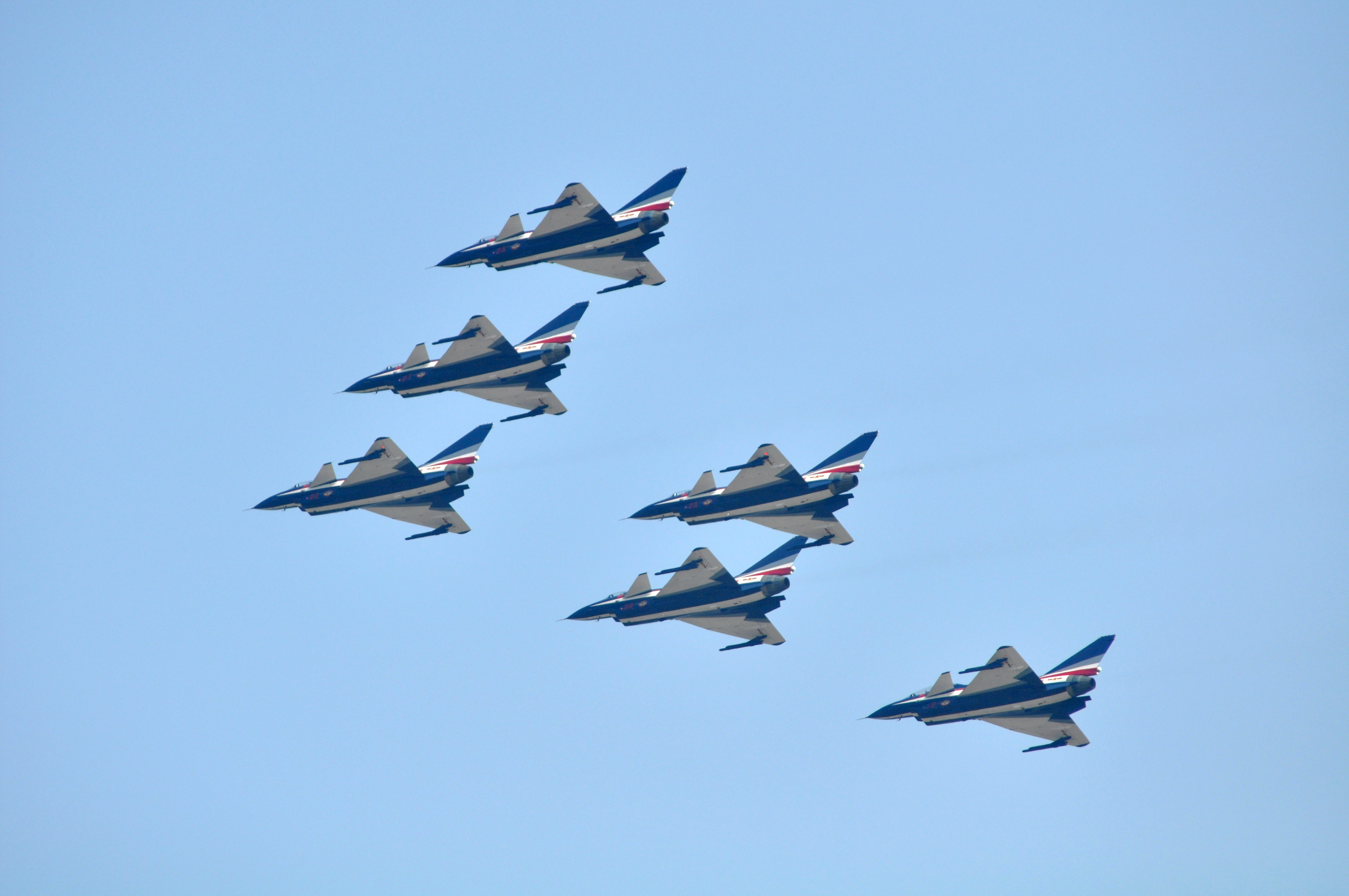
August 1st Chengdu J-10 flying in a delta formation

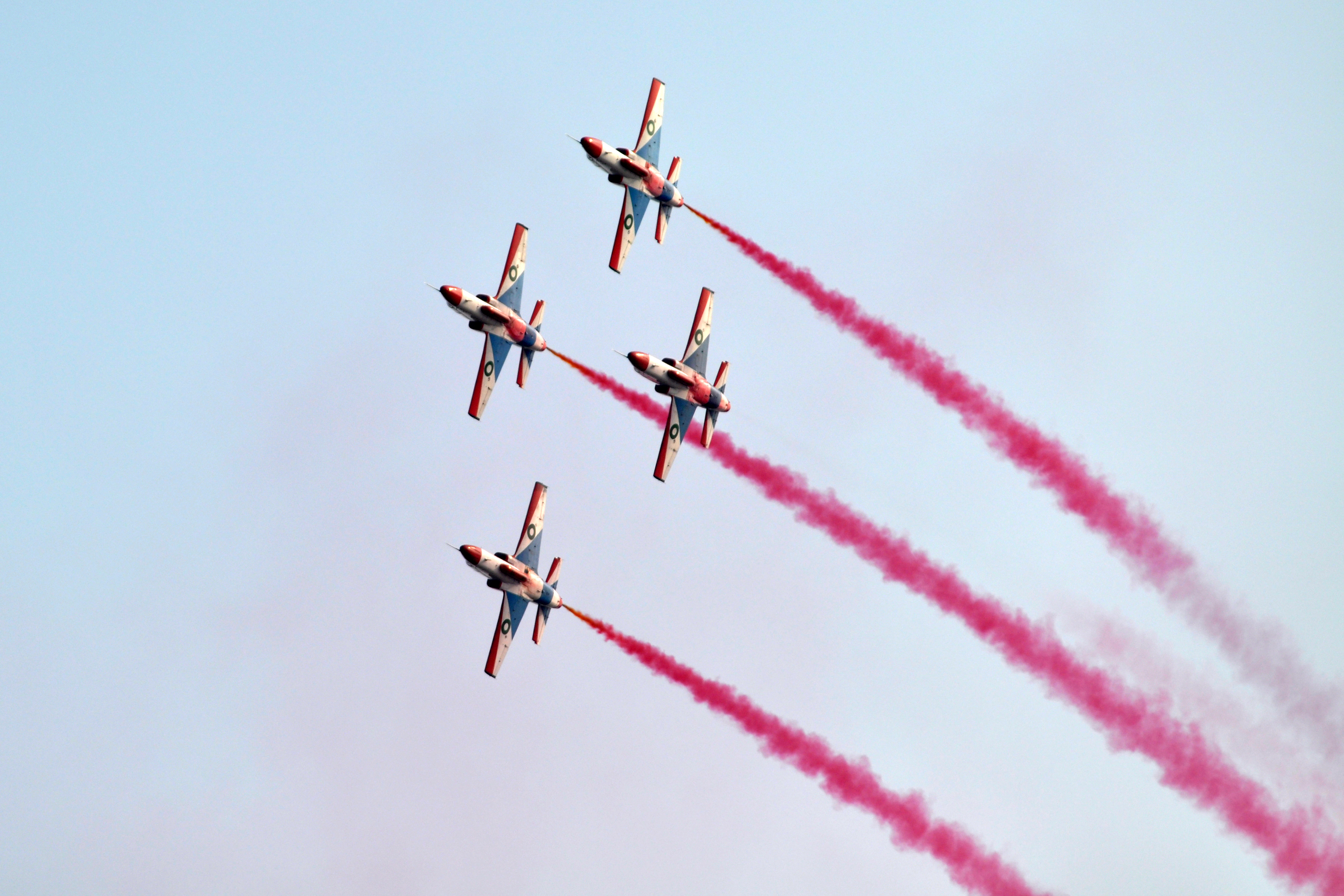
Pakistan Air Force Sherdils' K-8 Karakorum trainer performance

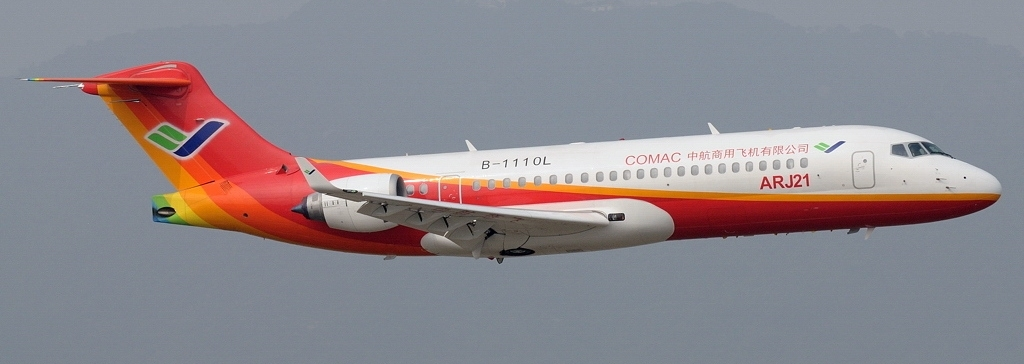
The Comac ARJ21-700 at the 2010 Zhuhai Air Show

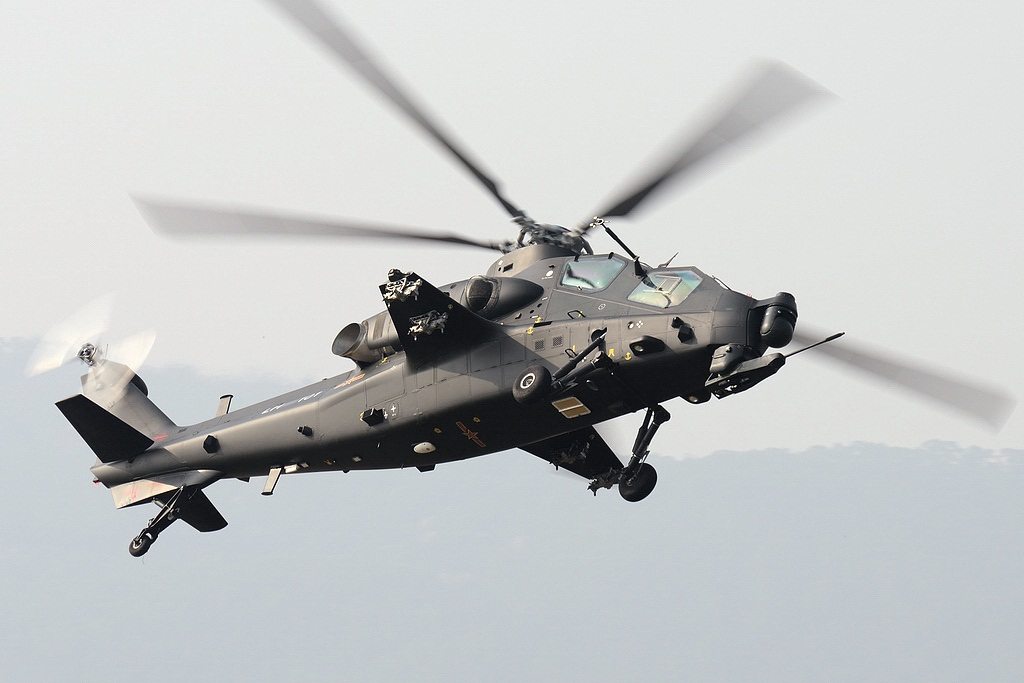
The CAIC Z-10 at the 2012 Zhuhai Air Show

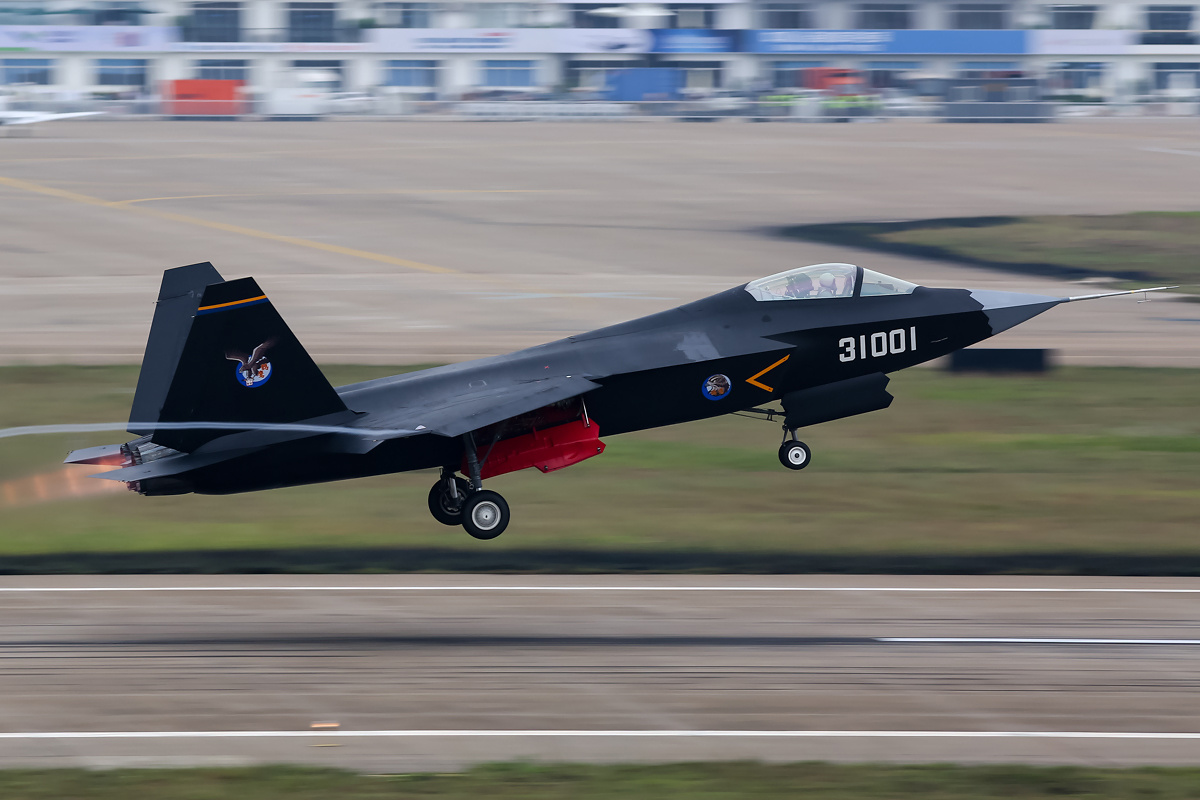
The Shenyang J-31 at the 2014 Zhuhai Air Show

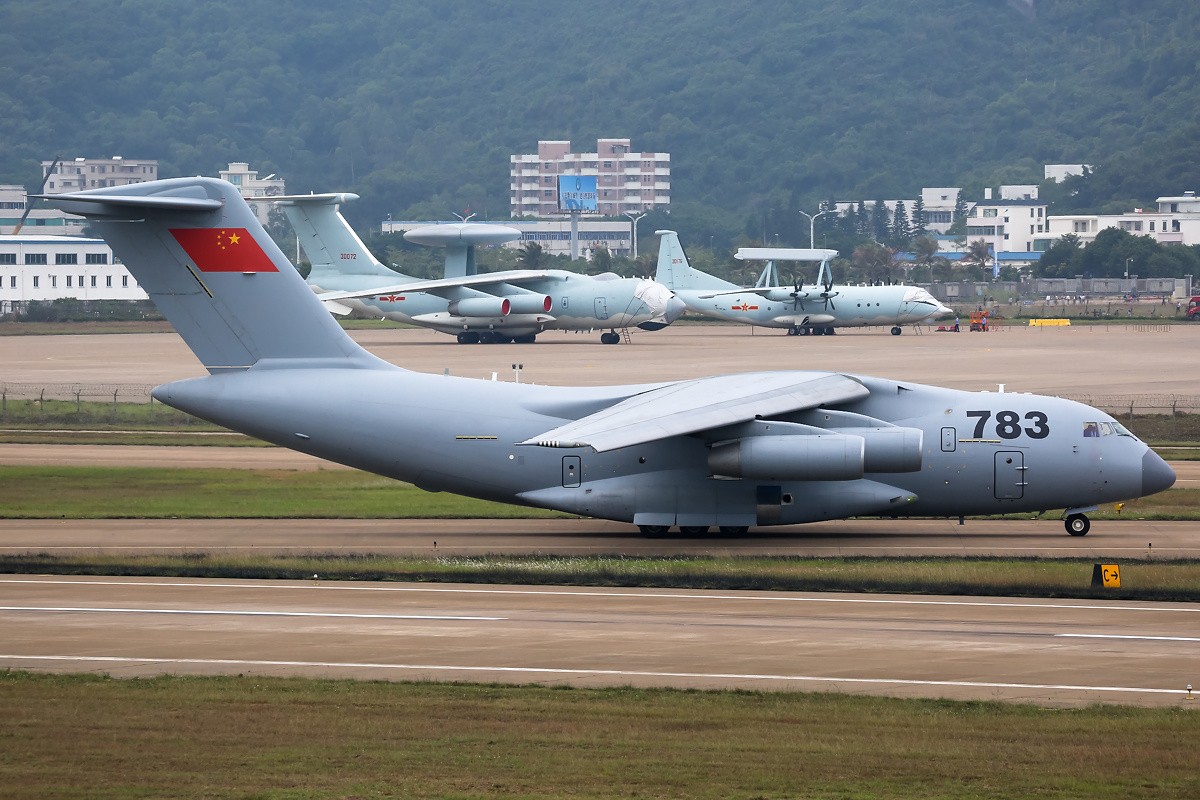
The Xi'an Y-20 at the 2014 Zhuhai Air Show

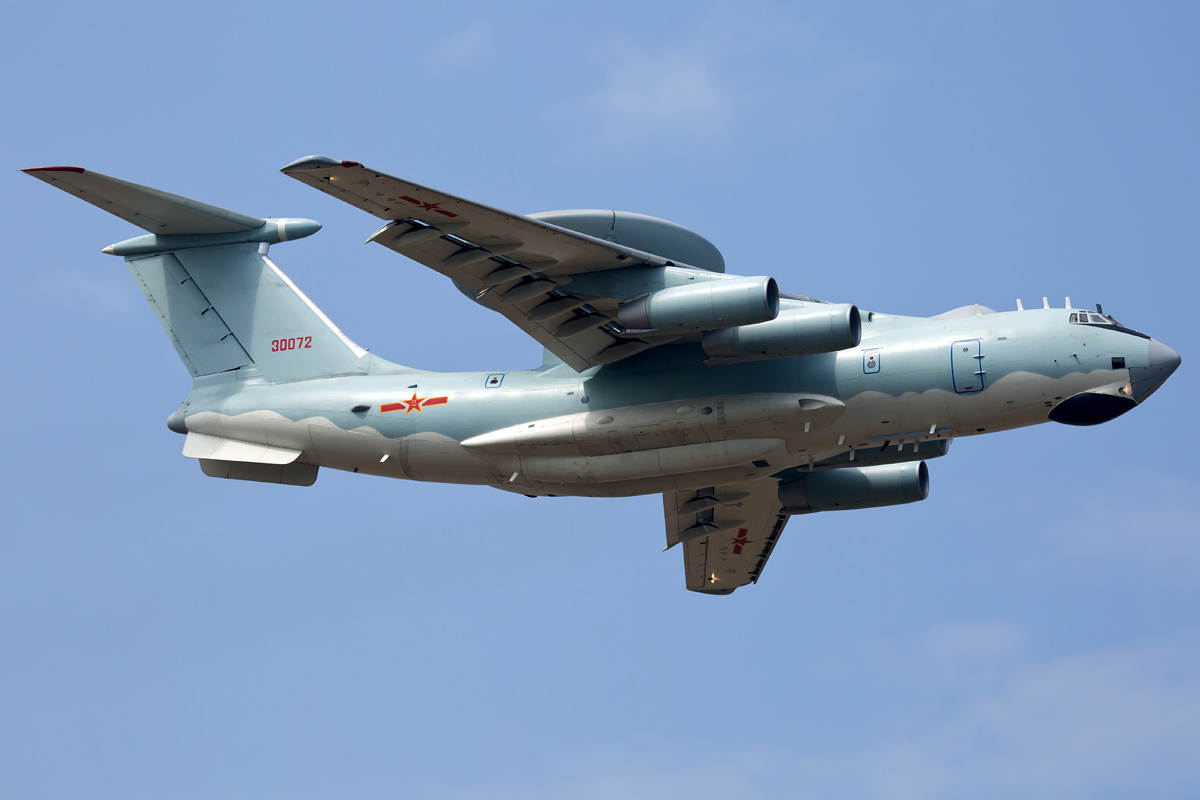
The KJ-2000 at 2014 Zhuhai Air Show

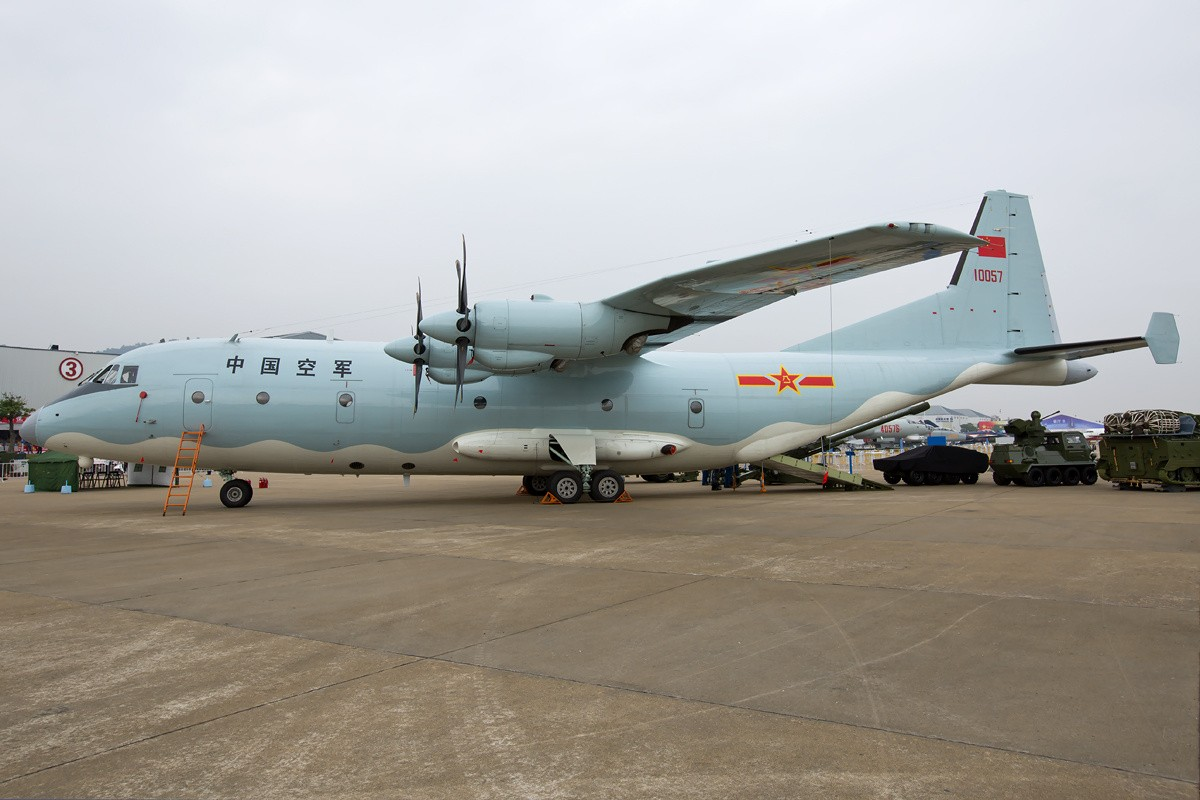
The Shaanxi Y-9 at 2014 Zhuhai Air Show

=== 1st edition (1996) ===
The first Airshow China was held from 5 to 10 November 1996. Performances included:

- Su-27 cobra
- Il-78 aerial refueling
- British "Golden Dream" aerobatic team
- "World Aerobatics Grand Prix"

=== 2nd edition (1998) ===
The second Airshow China was held from 15 to 22 November 1998. Performances included:

- People's Liberation Army Air Force "August 1st"
- Russian Knights
- Canadian "Northern Lights" (later as Northern Lights Combat Air Support and now Lortie Aviation Inc.) using the Extra 300L
- British "Golden Dream" aerobatic team
- Russian Gromov Flight Research Institute cobra and aerial refueling

=== 3rd edition (2000) ===
The third Airshow China was held from 6 to 12 November 2000. Performances included:

- Kamov Ka-50
- Sukhoi Su-30MK
- People's Liberation Army Air Force "August 1st"
- Russian Knights
- British "Golden Dream" aerobatic team
- FAI Star Aerobatic Team Elites

=== 4th edition (2002) ===
The fourth Airshow China was held from 3 to 7 November 2002.

=== 5th edition (2004) ===
The fifth Airshow China was held from 1 to 7 November 2004. Yang Liwei was present. Performances included:

- Strizhi
- People's Liberation Army Air Force "August 1st"

=== 6th edition (2006) ===
The sixth Airshow China was held from 31 October to 5 November 2006. The first three days were corporate days and not open to public. The remaining three days were public days. Over 30 countries and 600 aviation companies took part. Performances included:

- Russian Knights
- British "Golden Dream" aerobatic team

=== 7th edition (2008) ===
The seventh Airshow China was held from 4 to 9 November 2008. Some 4 billion U.S. dollars' worth of deals were signed at the six-day event, including one involving Commercial Aircraft Corp. of China (COMAC) selling 25 ARJ21-700 regional jets to GE Commercial Aviation Services of the United States (first delivery by 2013). Additionally, the Chengdu J-10 and Xi'an JH-7A both made their first public appearances. Other performances included:

- Airbus A380
- H-6U tanker mock refueling two Shenyang J-8IIs
- HAIG L-15
- Indian Air Force Surya Kiran

=== 8th edition (2010) ===
The eighth Airshow China was held in Zhuhai from 16 to 21 November 2010. It included:

- Airbus A380
- HAIG L-15 - Replaced with Ivchenko-Progress AL-222K-25F engine with afterburner
- People's Liberation Army Air Force "August 1st" – First open show after aircraft renewal with Chengdu J-10
- Pakistan Air Force Sherdils aerobatic team

=== 9th edition (2012) ===
The ninth Airshow China was held from 13 to 18 November 2012 and included:

- Shenyang J-31 display.
- FK-1000
- CM-602G
- TL500
- CM-506KG

=== 10th edition (2014) ===
The tenth Airshow China was held from 11 to 16 November 2014.

=== 11th edition (2016) ===
The eleventh Airshow China was held from 1 to 6 November 2016 and included:

- Republic of Korea Air Force's Black Eagles aerobatic team
- Royal Air Force's Red Arrows
- fly passing of Chengdu J-20 LRIP model.

=== 12th edition (2018) ===
The twelfth Airshow China was held from 6 to 11 November 2018 and included presentation of:

- CM-401 missile system
- world's first quantum radar
- world's first air-cooling airplane-board radar
- aerobatic performance of Chengdu J-10B, one of world's first serial airplane with thrust vector control (TVC) engine
- fullscale mockup of Tianhe core module of future Chinese large modular space station
- aerobatic performance of Chengdu J-20 production model.

=== 13th edition (2021) ===
Originally scheduled to happen in 2020, it was postponed to the following year due to the COVID-19 pandemic. The thirteenth Airshow China was held from 28 September to 3 October 2021. A total of 700 companies have participated in the event online and offline, with more than 100 aircraft exhibited:

- FH-97 jet UAV
- Shenyang FC-31
- Tengyun spaceplane

=== 14th edition (2022) ===
The fourteenth Airshow China was held from 8 November to 13 November 2022.

- Debut of E195-E2 E190-E2 also received certification from China's aviation regulator.
- CASIC Anti-UAV System, composed of DK-1 low-altitude search radar, the ZK-K20 air-defense control system, HQ-17AE and QW-12 short-range missiles, and ZR-1500 drone defense system.
- Export and air-launched version of YJ-21 hypersonic missile.
- JH-7A2 with AKF-98 stand-off cruise missile, AKF-88C anti-radiation missile and YL-5/YJ-1000-1 1,000-kilogram bomb.
- Chengdu J-20 stealth fighters ground display
- Chinese 6th generation jet fighter aircraft concept
- YY-20 tanker aircraft
- KJ-500A AEW&C aircraft debut
- FH-97A debut
- Chengdu WZ-10 debut
- Wing Loong III drone debut
- Guizhou WZ-7 Soaring Dragon ground display
- MD-22 near-space reusable aircraft
- WS-19 engine mock-up

=== 15th edition (2024) ===
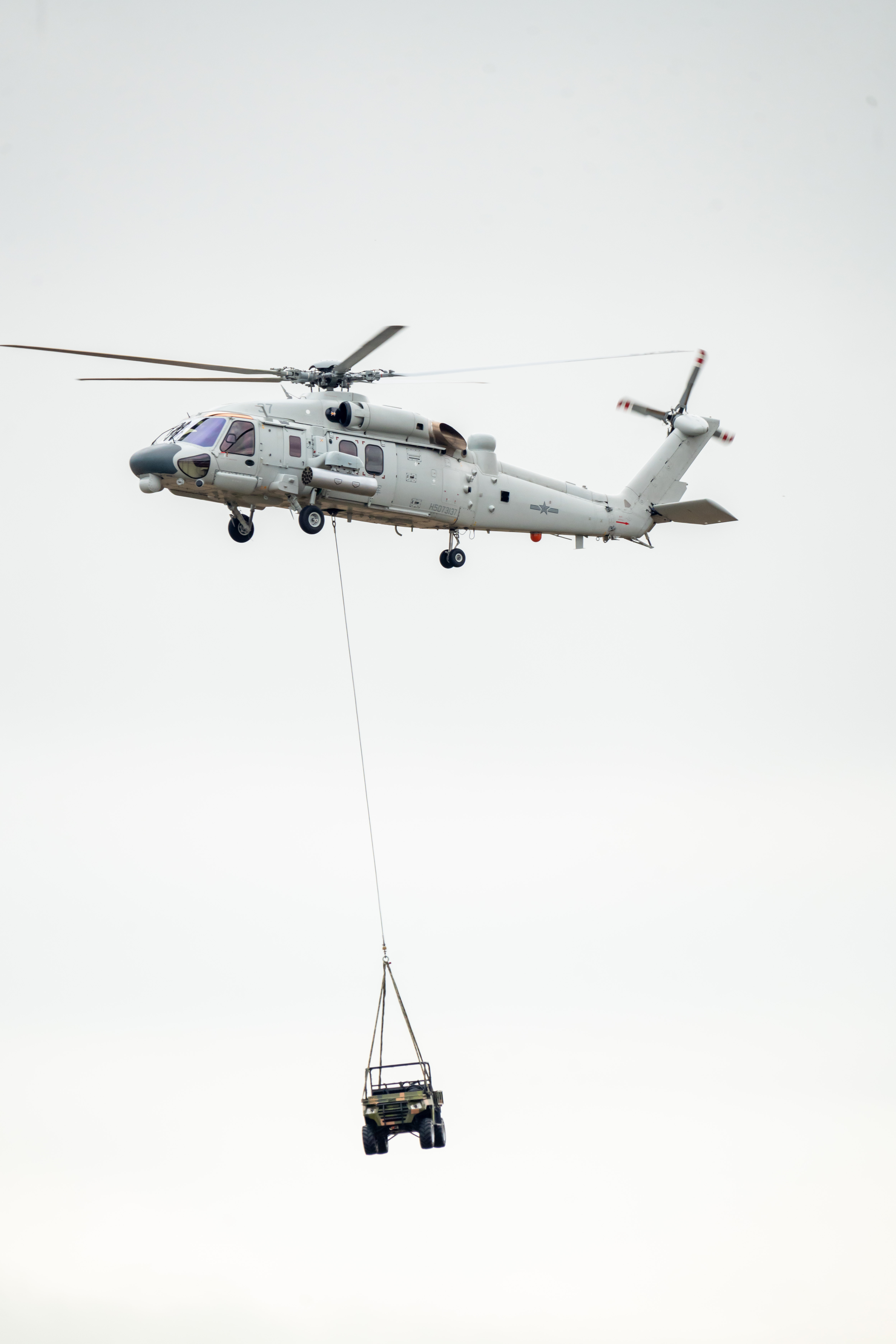
Z-20J Helicopter flying demonstration

- Debut of J-35A stealth fighter, J-15T carrier-based fighter and J-15D carrier-based electronic warfare aircraft
- Z-20F ASW helicopter
- Z-20J Naval utility/transport variant
- Su-57 stealth fighter (T-50-4 and T-50-7 prototypes)
- Russian Knights
- August First aerobatic team
- J-20S, Twin Seater variant of the J-20

== List of past performers (incomplete) ==
- August First (People's Liberation Army Air Force)
- Russian Knights and Swifts
- Patrouille de France
- British "Golden Dream" aerobatics team and UK Utterly Butterfly aerobatics team
- Canadian Air Force
- IAA All Stars aerobatics team
- Indian Air Force Surya Kiran (2008)
- Indonesian Air Force
- Royal Thai Air Force

== See also ==
- MAKS (air show)
- Air transport in China
