= China South Industries Group =

Chinese state-owned company

China South Industries Group Corporation
- Native name: 中国南方工业集团公司
- Type: State owned
- Industry: Defense, automotive
- Founded: July 1999; 27 years ago
- Headquarters: Haidian District, Beijing, China
- Area served: Worldwide
- Key people: Xu Ping (Chairman); Gong Yande (President)
- Products: Munitions, Firearms, Artillery, Explosive, Combat vehicle, Radar, Electro-optical devices, Commercial vehicles, Automobile parts
- Revenue: 4,610,000,000 United States dollar (2019)
- Net income: 268,000,000 United States dollar
- Total assets: 48,400,000,000 United States dollar
- Number of employees: 172,030 (December 2013)
- Website: www.csgc.com.cn

China South Industries Group Corporation
- Simplified Chinese: 中国南方工业公司
- Traditional Chinese: 中國南方工業公司
Transcriptions
Standard Mandarin
- Hanyu Pinyin: Zhōngguó Nánfāng Gōngyè Gōngsī

Alternative Chinese name
- Simplified Chinese: 中国兵器装备集团公司
- Traditional Chinese: 中國兵器裝備集團公司
Transcriptions
Standard Mandarin
- Hanyu Pinyin: Zhōngguó Bīngqì Zhuāngbèi Jítuán Gōngsī

The China Ordnance Equipment Group Corporation (Chinese: 中国兵器装备集团公司), also known as China South Industries Group Corporation (CSGC, Chinese: 中国南方工业集团公司), is a Chinese state-owned manufacturer of automobiles, motorcycles, firearms, vehicle components, and optical-electronic products and other special products domestically and internationally.

== History ==
The company was founded in 1999 and is based in Haidian District, Beijing. CSGC is the parent company of Changan Automobile.

In November 2020, Donald Trump issued an executive order prohibiting any American company or individual from owning shares in companies that the United States Department of Defense has listed as having links to the People's Liberation Army, which included China South Industries Group Corporation.

In June 2025, the State Council announced the spin-off of the automotive business from China South Industries Group Corporation, Changan Automobile will be separated into an independent Central state-owned enterprise, with the State-owned Assets Supervision and Administration Commission of the State Council (SASAC) performing the duties of the capital contributor. Following this spin-off, the indirect controlling shareholder of Changan Automobile will change to the central enterprise resulting from the automotive business separation, while the actual controller remains unchanged.

== See also ==
- Norinco
