= Unguided bomb =

Aerial bomb without guidance, designed for ballistic delivery

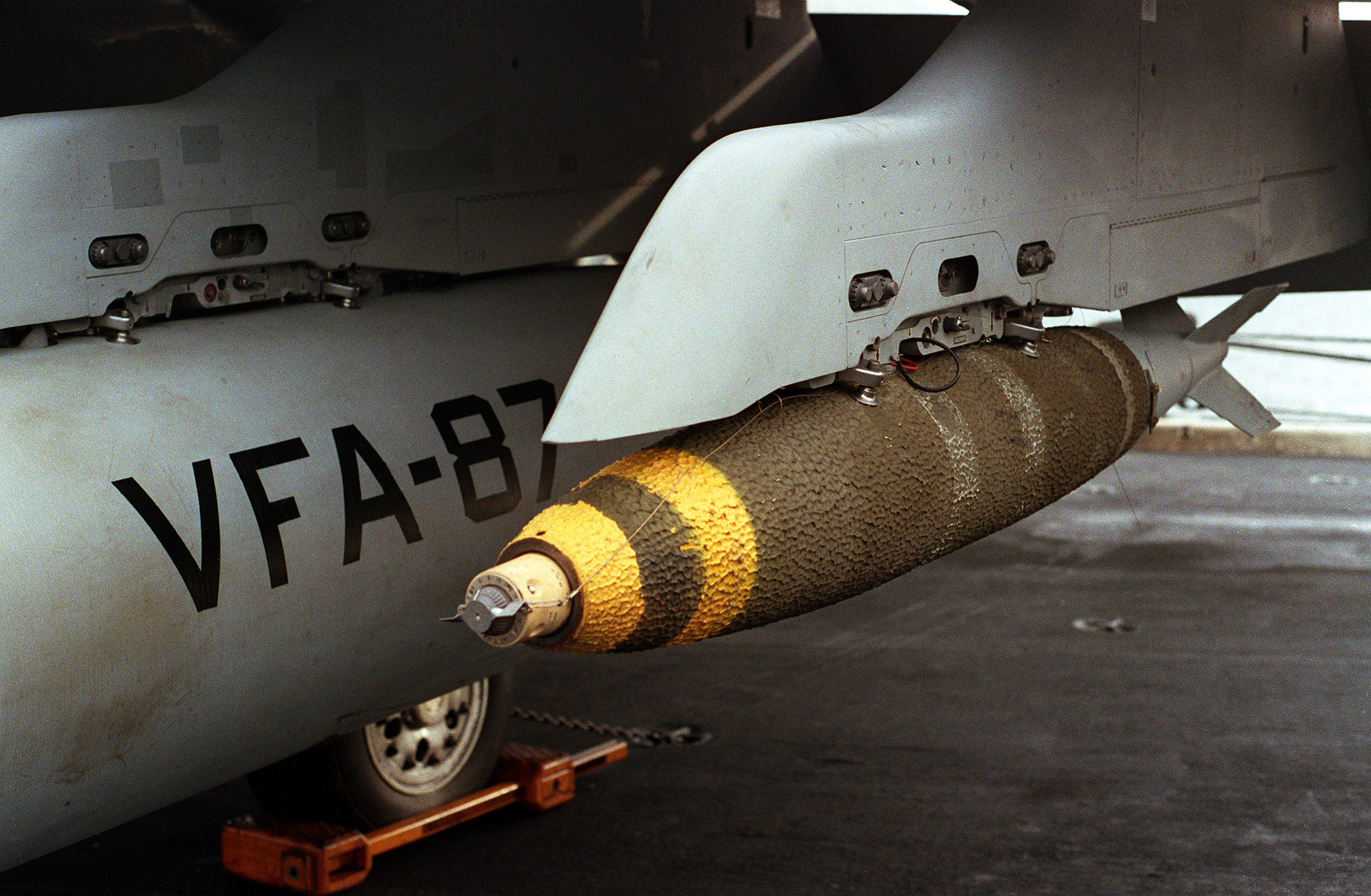
An unguided 500 lb (230 kg) Mark 82 bomb with no retarder

An unguided bomb, also known as a free-fall bomb, gravity bomb, dumb bomb, or iron bomb, is an aircraft-dropped bomb (conventional or nuclear) that does not contain a guidance system and hence simply follows a ballistic trajectory. It includes all aircraft bombs in general service until the latter half of World War II, and the vast majority until the late 1980s, which were known simply as "bombs".

Then, with the dramatically increased use of precision-guided munitions, a retronym was needed to separate "smart bombs" from free-fall bombs. "Dumb bomb" was used for a time, but many military circles felt it sounded trite, and eventually "gravity bomb" gained popularity.

Bomb casings for unguided bombs are typically aerodynamic in shape, often with fins at the tail section, which reduce drag and increase stability after release, both of which serve to improve accuracy and consistency of trajectory.

Unguided bombs typically use a contact fuze for detonation upon impact, or some milliseconds after if a penetration effect is required. Alternatives include a fuze with an altimeter to cause an air burst at the desired altitude, and a proximity fuze to cause an air burst at a specific distance from the ground or other target.

== Retarded bomb ==
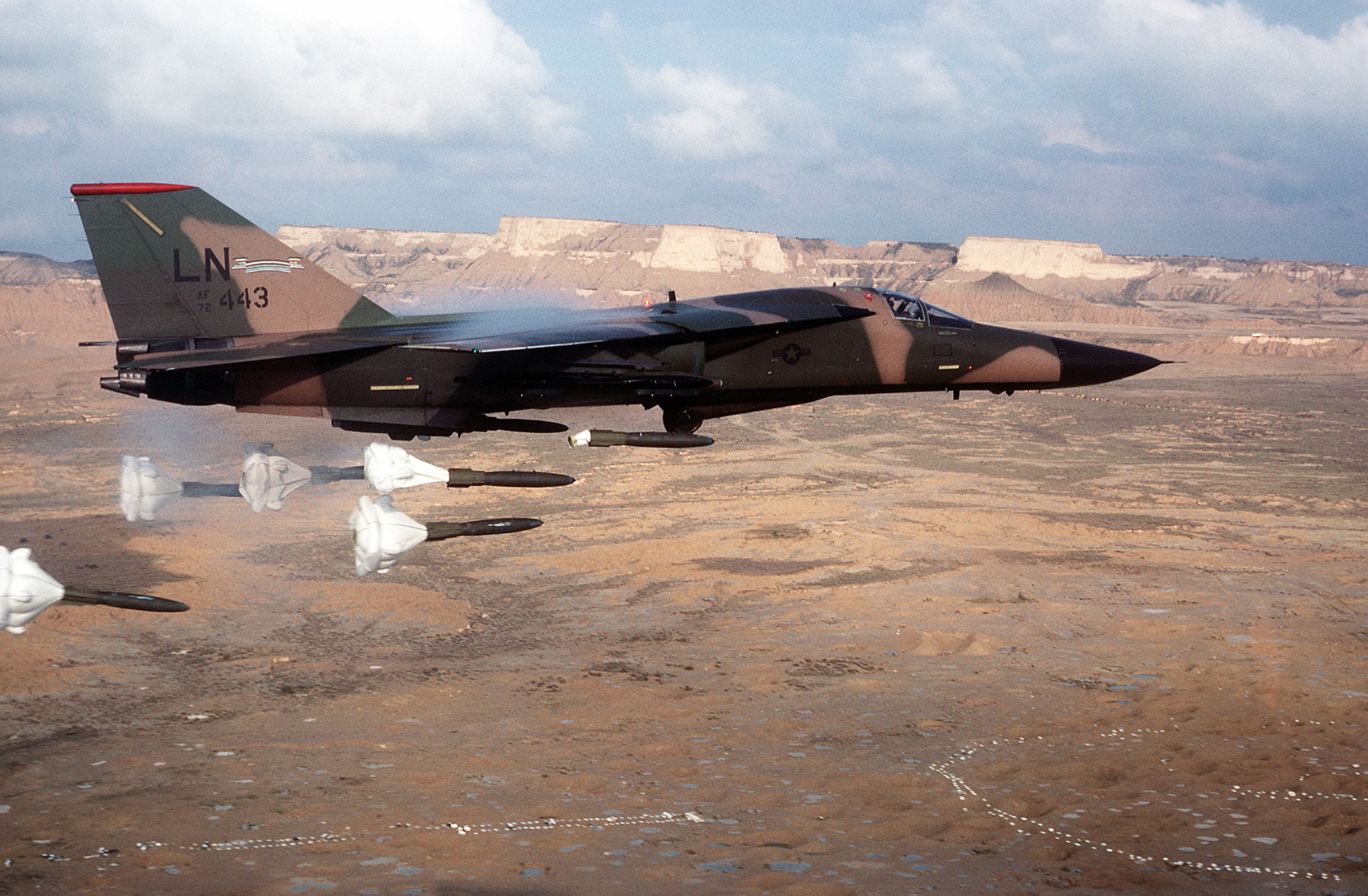
An F-111 dropping Mark 82 bombs with ballute-type retardation systems (Mk82AIR / BSU49B)

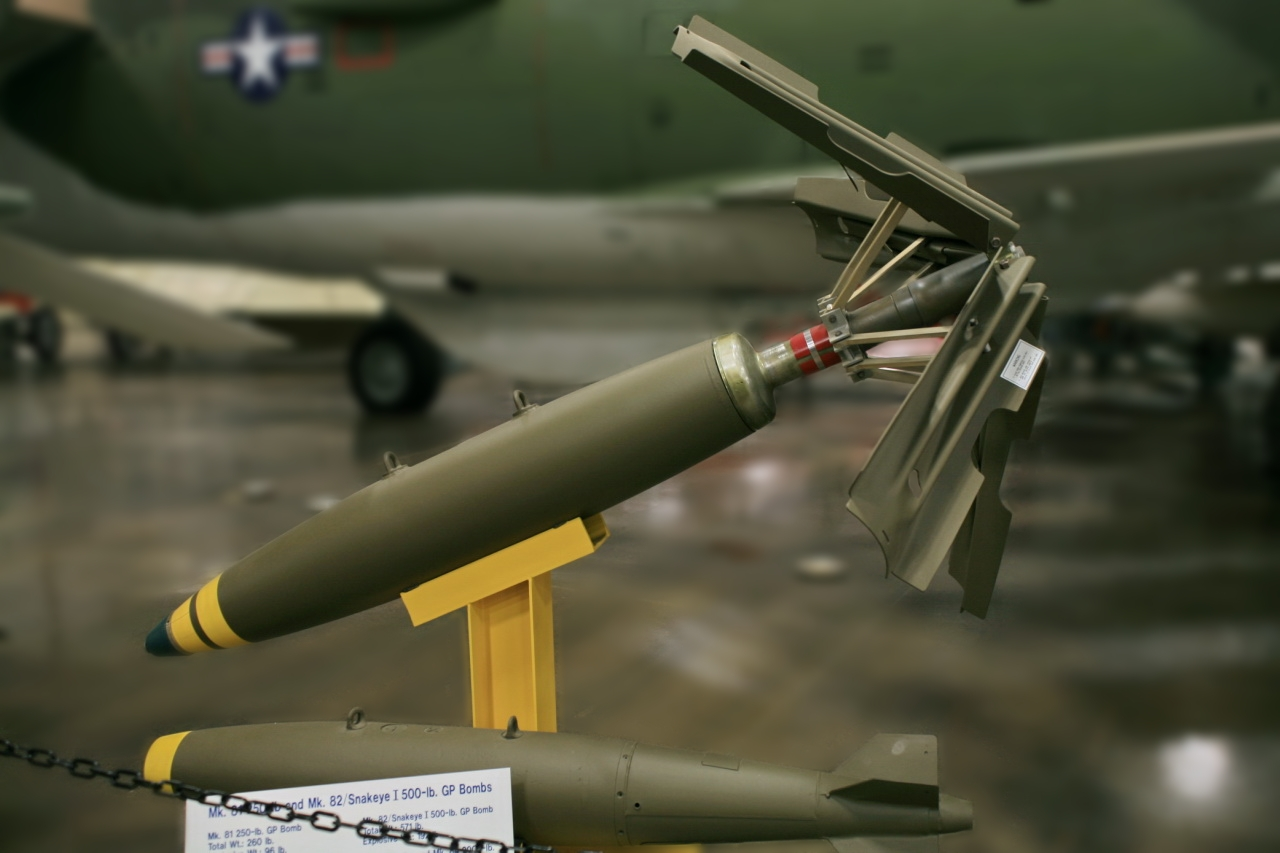
Mk. 82 bomb with a Snake Eye tail retarding device – this photograph shows an unfuzed, museum display Mk 82 with its usual combat paint scheme. For display purposes, the optional high-drag Snake Eye tailfin set used for low-altitude release is shown.

The retarded bomb uses a mechanical method of creating increased aerodynamic drag, such as a parachute, ballute, or drag-inducing petals. These deploy after the ordnance is released, slowing its fall and abbreviating its forward trajectory, giving the aircraft time to get clear of the blast zone when bombing from low altitudes or with nuclear ordnance. However, these bombs are less accurate than conventional free-fall bombs. Generally the high-drag tail replaces the low-drag so that the same bomb can be configured for either mode of attack during weapons preparation. High-drag bombs can also be dropped in low-drag mode if the pilot selects this option in the aircraft's weapon system, and will function exactly like a low-drag weapon.

== See also ==
- Carpet bombing
- Constantly computed impact point
- General-purpose bomb
- Guided bomb
- Joint Direct Attack Munition (JDAM)
- Laydown delivery
