= KLJ =

klj is the ISO 639 code for the Khalaj language.

KLJ may refer to:

- a series of aircraft radars (see KLJ-5 and KLJ-7),
- the former IATA code of Klaipėda Airfield
