= CAC/PAC JF-17 Thunder =

Sino-Pakistani multirole fighter aircraft

JF-17 Thunder
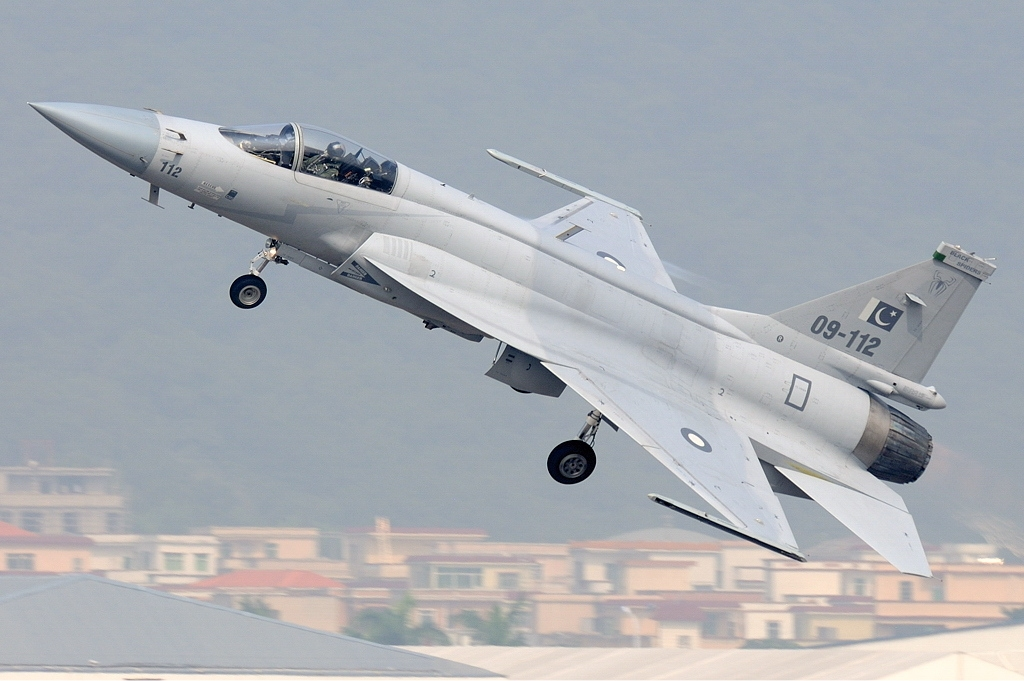
- Pakistan Air Force JF-17 Block 1

General information
- Type: Multirole Combat Aircraft
- National origin: Pakistan / China
- Manufacturer: Pakistan Aeronautical Complex / Chengdu Aircraft Industry Group
- Status: In service
- Primary users: Pakistan Air Force: Myanmar Air Force; Nigerian Air Force; Azerbaijani Air Forces
- Number built: >200

History
- Manufactured: In China: June 2007 – present In Pakistan: January 2008 – present
- Introduction date: 12 March 2007
- First flight: 25 August 2003

The CAC/PAC JF-17 Thunder, (Note: Urdu: جے ایف-۱۷ رعد, romanized: je êf satrāuh r'ad) also known as FC-1 Xiaolong, (Note: Chinese: 枭龙; pinyin: Xiāo Lóng; lit. 'Fierce Dragon') is a Sino-Pakistani single-engine lightweight supersonic multirole combat aircraft developed jointly by the Pakistan Aeronautical Complex (PAC) and the Chengdu Aircraft Corporation (CAC) of China. It is a fourth-generation fighter, designed and developed as a replacement for the third-generation A-5C, F-7P/PG, Mirage III, and Mirage 5 combat aircraft in the Pakistan Air Force (PAF). The JF-17 can be used for multiple roles, including interception, ground attack, anti-ship, and aerial reconnaissance. The Pakistani designation "JF-17" stands for "Joint Fighter-17", with the "Joint Fighter" denoting the joint Pakistani-Chinese development of the aircraft and the "-17" denoting that, in the PAF's vision, it is the successor to the F-16. The Chinese designation "FC-1" stands for "Fighter China-1".

The JF-17 can deploy diverse ordnance, including air-to-air, air-to-surface, and anti-ship missiles; guided and unguided bombs; and a 23-mm GSh-23-2 twin-barrel autocannon. Powered by the Russian Klimov RD-93 (JF-17 Blocks 1 and 2) or Klimov RD-93MA (JF-17 Block 3) afterburning turbofan engine, it has a top speed of Mach 1.6. The JF-17 is the backbone and workhorse of the PAF, complementing the F-16 Fighting Falcon at approximately half the cost, with the Block II variant costing $25 million. The JF-17 was inducted in the PAF in 2007.

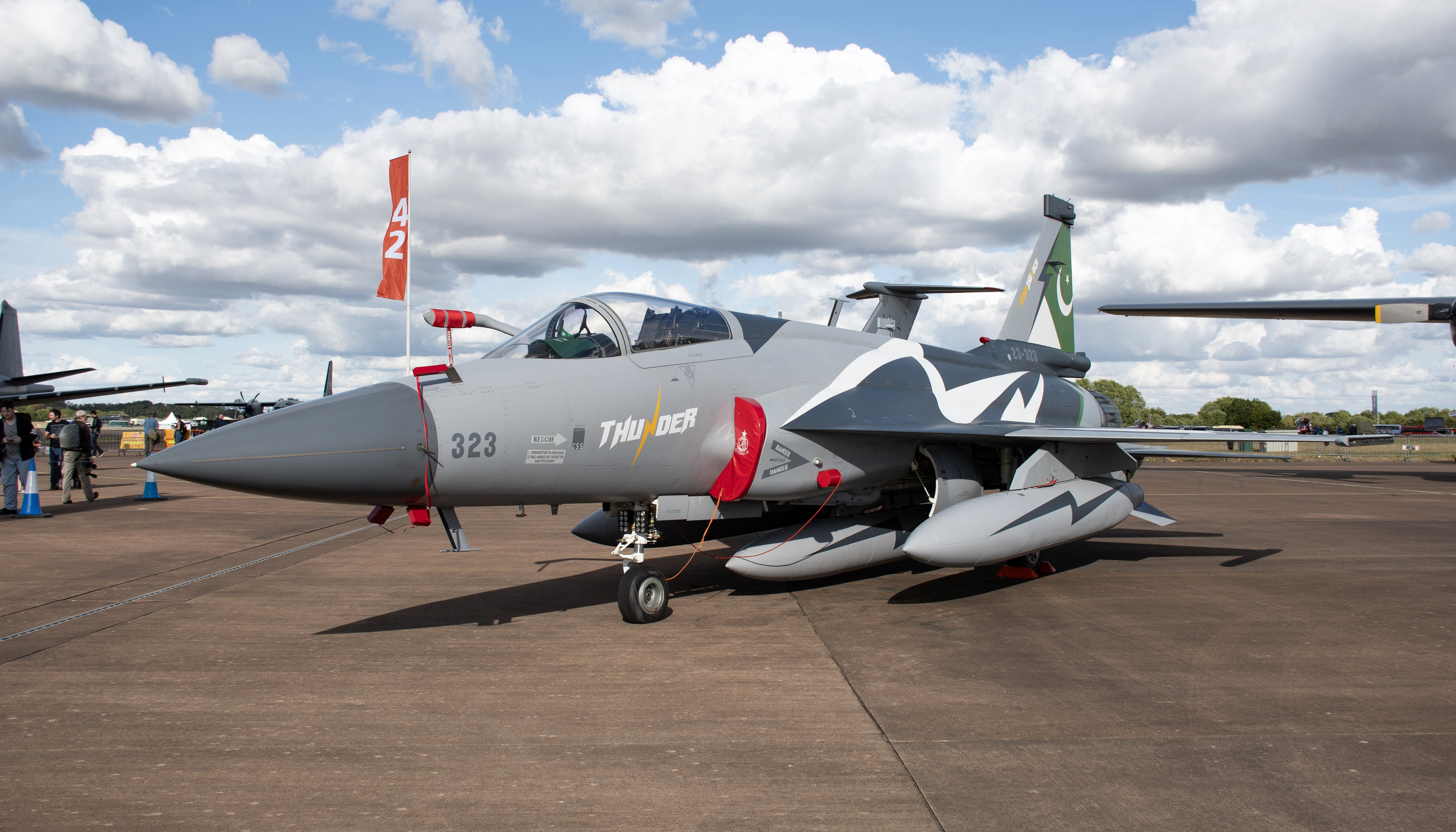
JF-17 Block III at RIAT 2025

Fifty-eight per cent of the JF-17 airframe, including its front fuselage, wings, and vertical stabiliser, is produced in Pakistan, whereas forty-two per cent is produced in China, with the final assembly and serial production taking place in Pakistan. In 2015, Pakistan produced 16 JF-17s. As of 2016, PAC has the capacity to produce 20 JF-17s annually. By April 2017, PAC had manufactured 70 Block 1 aircraft and 33 Block 2 aircraft for the PAF. By 2016, PAF JF-17s had accumulated over 19,000 hours of operational flight. In 2017, PAC/CAC began developing a dual-seat variant known as the JF-17B for enhanced operational capability, conversion training, and lead-in fighter training. The JF-17B Block 2 variant went into serial production at PAC in 2018 and 26 aircraft were delivered to the PAF by December 2020. In December 2020, PAC began serial production of a more advanced Block 3 version of the aircraft with an active electronically scanned array (AESA) radar, a more powerful Russian Klimov RD-93MA engine along with compatibility with the Chinese Guizhou WS-13 Taishan engine, a larger and more advanced wide-angle Head-Up Display (HUD), electronic countermeasures, an additional hardpoint, and enhanced weapons capability.

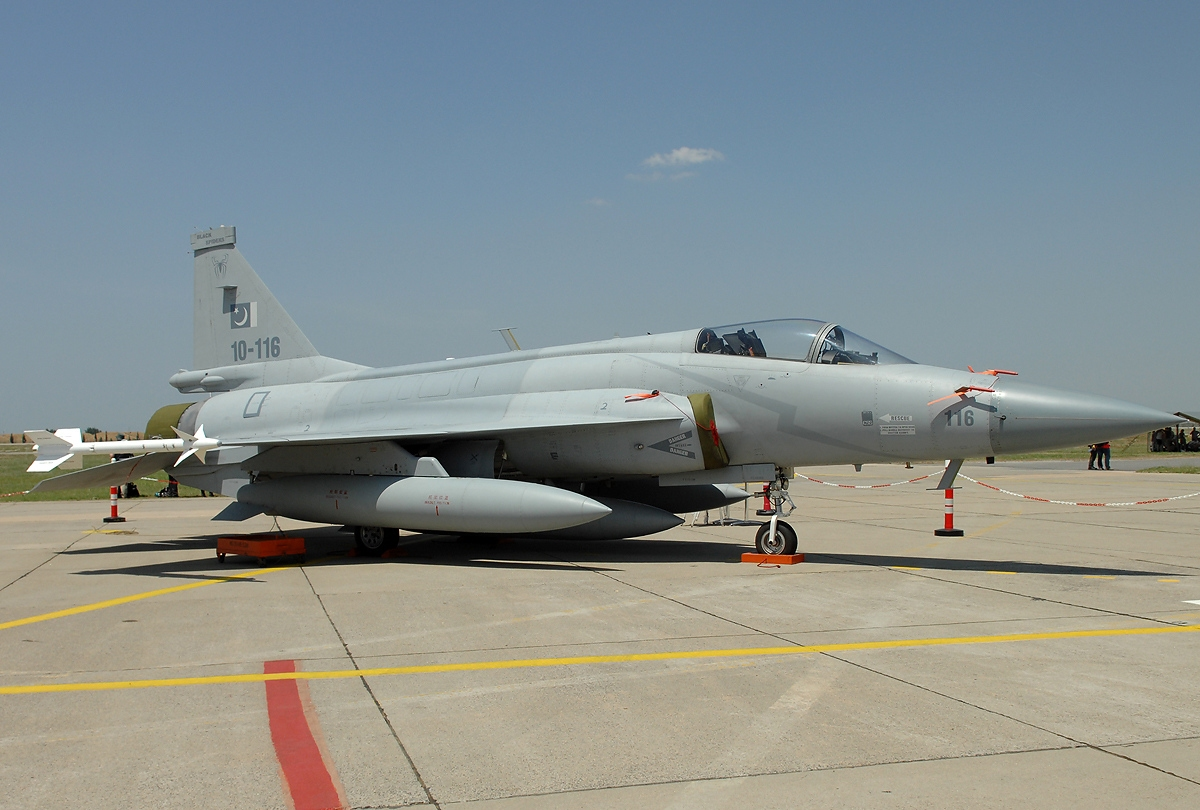
Pakistan Air Force JF-17 armed with PL-5 infrared homing air-to-air missile

The PAF JF-17s have seen military action, both air-to-air and air-to-ground, including bombing terrorist positions in North Waziristan near the Pakistan-Afghanistan border during anti-terror operations in 2014 and 2017, using both guided and unguided munitions, shooting down an intruding Iranian military drone near the Pakistan-Iran border in Balochistan in 2017, in Operation Swift Retort during the 2019 Jammu and Kashmir airstrikes and aerial skirmish between India and Pakistan, and during Operation Marg Bar Sarmachar in 2024 in which Pakistan launched a series of air and artillery strikes inside Iran's Sistan and Baluchestan province targeting Baloch separatist groups. In March and December 2024, PAF JF-17s were used in cross-border airstrikes against Pakistani Taliban hideouts inside Afghanistan. Nigerian Air Force (NAF) JF-17s have seen military action in anti-terrorism and anti-insurgency operations in Nigeria. Myanmar Air Force has also frequently deployed its JF-17 fleet against various insurgent groups. During the May 2025 India–Pakistan conflict, the PAF deployed JF-17s in combat in both the air-to-air and air-to-ground roles.

== Development ==
=== Background ===
The JF-17 was designed and developed primarily to meet the PAF requirement for an affordable, unsanctionable, fourth-generation, lightweight, multi-role combat aircraft as a replacement for its large fleet of third-generation Nanchang A-5C bombers, Chengdu F-7P/PG interceptors, Mirage III multi-role combat aircraft, and Mirage 5 strike aircraft, with a cost of US$500 million, divided equally between Pakistan and China. The aircraft was also intended to have export potential as a cost-effective and competitive alternative to more expensive Western fighters. The development of this aircraft was headed by Yang Wei, considered to be China's "ace designer", who also designed the Chengdu J-20.

By 1989, because of economic sanctions by the US, Pakistan had abandoned Project Sabre II, a design study involving US aircraft manufacturer Grumman and China, and had decided to redesign and upgrade the Chengdu F-7. In 1988, China and Grumman carried out a nine-month preliminary design study of the Super 7, an upgrade of the Chengdu F-7. Grumman left the project when sanctions were placed on China following the political fallout from the 1989 Tiananmen Square protests. After Grumman left the Chengdu Super 7 project, the project was abandoned and, in its place, the Fighter China-1 (FC-1) project was launched in 1991. In 1995, Pakistan and China signed a memorandum of understanding (MoU) for joint design and development of a new fighter, and over the next few years worked out the project details. In June 1995, Mikoyan had joined the project to provide "design support", this also involved the secondment of several engineers by CAC.

=== Launch of FC-1 project ===
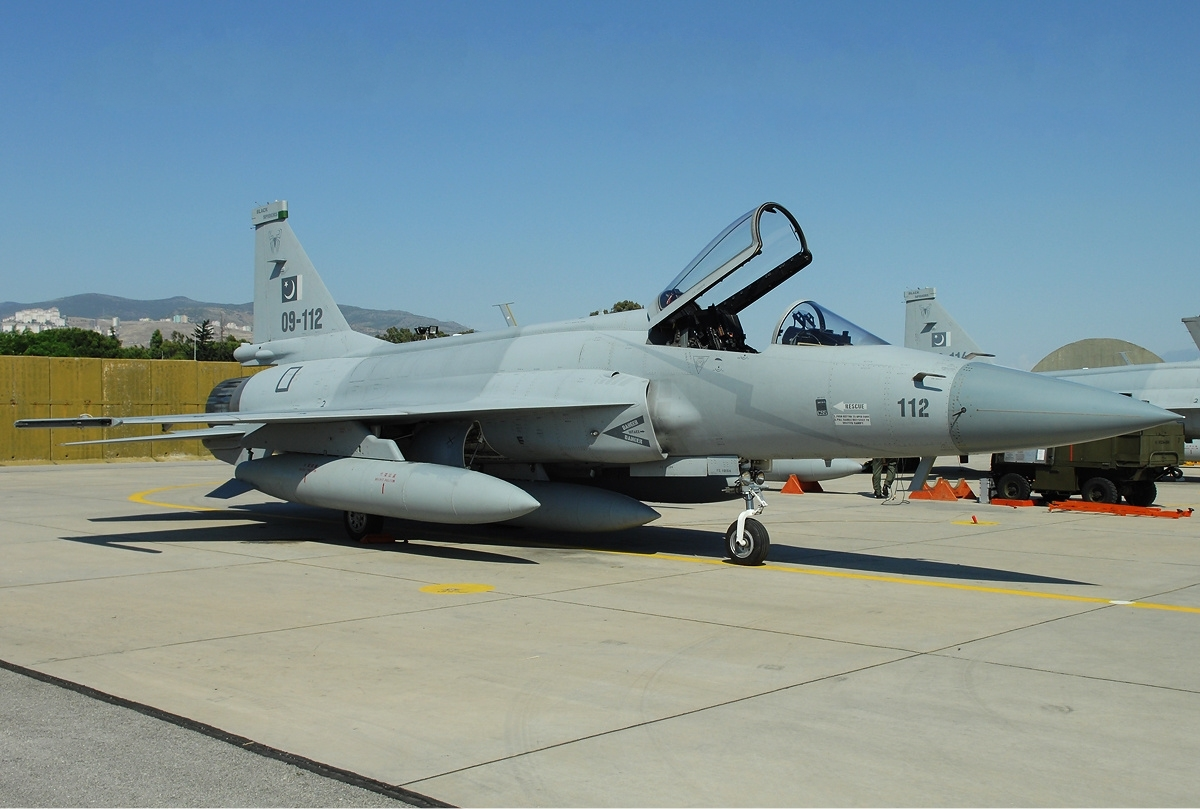
A PAF JF-17 Block 1 in İzmir, Turkey for the 2011 Izmir Air Show

In October 1995, Pakistan was reportedly to select a Western company by the end of the year to provide and integrate the FC-1's avionics, which was expected to go into production by 1999. The avionics were said to include radar, Inertial navigation system, Head-up display, and Multi-function displays. Competing bids came from Thomson-CSF with a variant of the Radar Doppler Multitarget (RDY), SAGEM with a similar avionics package to those used in the ROSE upgrade project, and Marconi Electronic Systems with its Blue Hawk radar. FIAR's (now SELEX Galileo) Grifo S7 radar was expected to be selected due to the company's ties with the PAF. In February 1998, Pakistan and China signed a letter of intent covering airframe development. Russia's Klimov offered a variant of the RD-33 turbofan engine to power the fighter. In April 1999, South Africa's Denel offered to arm the Super 7 with the T-darter beyond-visual-range (BVR) air-to-air missile (AAM), rather than the previously reported R-Darter. Previously in 1987, Pratt & Whitney offered the Super-7 project three engine options; PW1212, F404, and PW1216, with local manufacturing in either China or Pakistan. Rolls-Royce offered its RB199-127/128 turbofan engine; this plan was scrapped in 1989.

In June 1999, the contract to jointly develop and produce the Chengdu FC-1/Super 7 was signed. After GEC-Marconi had abandoned the bidding to supply an integrated avionics suite, FIAR and Thomson-CSF proposed a number of avionics suites based on the Grifo S7 and RC400 radars respectively, despite previously hoping to use the PAF's Super 7 to launch its new Blue Hawk radar. Because of sanctions placed on Pakistan after the country's 1998 nuclear weapons tests, design work progressed very slowly over the next 18 months, preventing delivery of the Western avionics to the PAF. In early 2001, the PAF decided to decouple the airframe from the avionics, enabling design work on the aircraft to continue. As the airframe was developed, any new avionics requirements by the PAF could be more easily integrated into the airframe.

Prototype production began in September 2002; a full-size mock-up of the FC-1/Super 7 was displayed at Airshow China in November 2002. The first batch of Klimov RD-93 turbofan engines that would power the prototypes was also delivered in 2002. According to a China National Aero-Technology Import & Export Corporation (CATIC) official, the JF-17's low cost is due to some of the on-board systems having been adapted from those of the Chengdu J-10. The official said, "This transfer of technology—transposing the aircraft systems from the J-10 to the JF-17—is what makes the JF-17 so cost-effective". The use of computer-aided design software shortened the design phase of the JF-17.

=== Flight testing and redesigning ===
The first prototype, PT-01, was rolled out on 31 May 2003 and transferred to the Chengdu Flight Test Centre to be prepared for its maiden flight. This was initially planned to take place in June, but was delayed due to concerns about the SARS outbreak. The designation Super-7 was replaced by "JF-17" (Joint Fighter-17) around this point. Low speed taxiing trials began at Wenjiang Airport, Chengdu, on 27 June 2003. The maiden flight was made in late August 2003; an official maiden flight of the prototype took place in early September. The prototype was marked with the new PAF designation JF-17. By March 2004, CAC had made around 20 test flights of the first prototype. On 7 April 2004, PAF test pilots Rashid Habib and Mohammad Ehsan-ul-Haq flew PT-01 for the first time. The maiden flight of the third prototype, PT-03, took place on 9 April 2004. In March 2004, Pakistan was planning to induct around 200 aircraft.

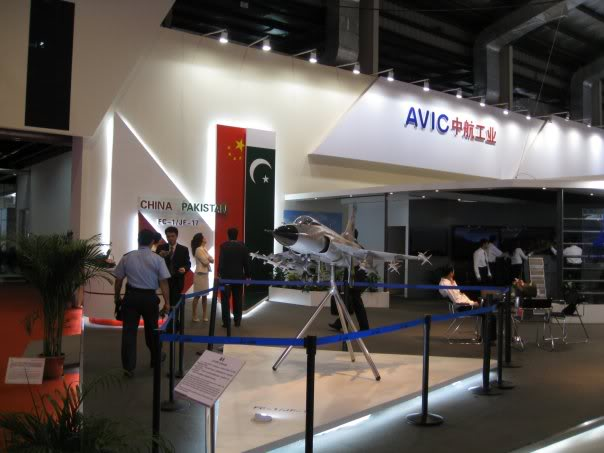
JF-17 Thunder model

Following the third prototype, several design improvements were developed and incorporated into further aircraft. Because of excessive smoke emissions by the RD-93 engine, the air intakes were widened. Reported control problems found in testing resulted in alterations to the wing leading edge root extensions (LERX). The vertical tail fin was enlarged to house an expanded electronic warfare equipment bay in the tip. The redesigned aircraft had a slightly increased maximum take-off weight and incorporated an increased quantity of Chinese-sourced avionics; however PAF had selected Western avionics for their aircraft, postponing PAF deliveries from late 2005 until 2007. Pakistan evaluated British, French, and Italian avionics suites, the winner of which was expected to be finalised in 2006. PT-04, the fourth prototype and the first to incorporate the design changes, was rolled out in April 2006 and made its first flight on 28 April 2006.

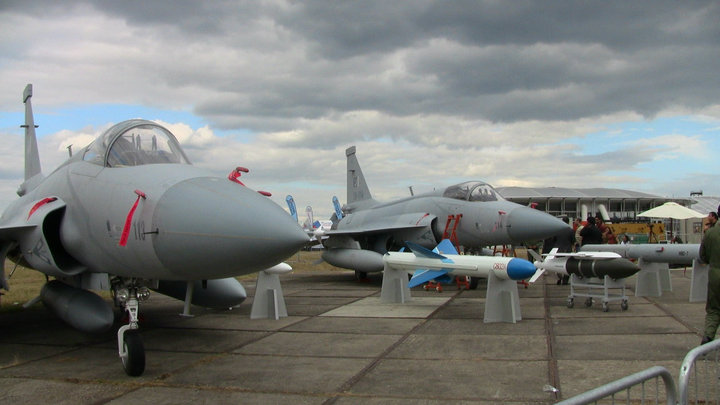
JF-17 and their DSI air intakes.

The modified air intakes replaced conventional intake ramps—whose function is to divert turbulent boundary layer airflow away from the inlet and prevent it entering the engine—with a diverterless supersonic inlet (DSI) design. The DSI uses a combination of forward-swept inlet cowls and a three-dimensional compression surface to divert the boundary layer airflow at high sub-sonic and supersonic speeds. According to Lockheed Martin, the DSI design prevents most of the boundary layer air from entering the engine at speeds up to two times the speed of sound, reduces weight by removing the need for complex mechanical intake mechanisms and is stealthier than a conventional intake. In 1999, developmental work on the DSI with the aim of improving aircraft performance commenced. The JF-17 design was finalised in 2001. Multiple models underwent wind tunnel tests; it was found that the DSI reduced weight, cost, and complexity while improving performance.

For the avionics and weapons qualification phase of the flight testing, PT-04 was fitted with a fourth-generation avionics suite that incorporates sensor fusion, an electronic warfare suite, enhanced man-machine interface, Digital Electronic Engine Control (DEEC) for the RD-93 turbofan engine, FBW flight controls, day/night precision surface attack capability, and multi-mode, pulse-Doppler radar for BVR air-to-air attack capability. The sixth prototype, PT-06, made its maiden flight on 10 September 2006. Following a competition in 2008, Martin-Baker was selected over a Chinese firm for the supply of fifty PK16LE ejection seats. and is stealthier than a conventional intake. In 1999, developmental work on the DSI with the aim of improving aircraft performance commenced. The JF-17 design was finalised in 2001. Multiple models underwent wind tunnel tests; it was found that the DSI reduced weight, cost, and complexity while improving performance.

=== Production ===
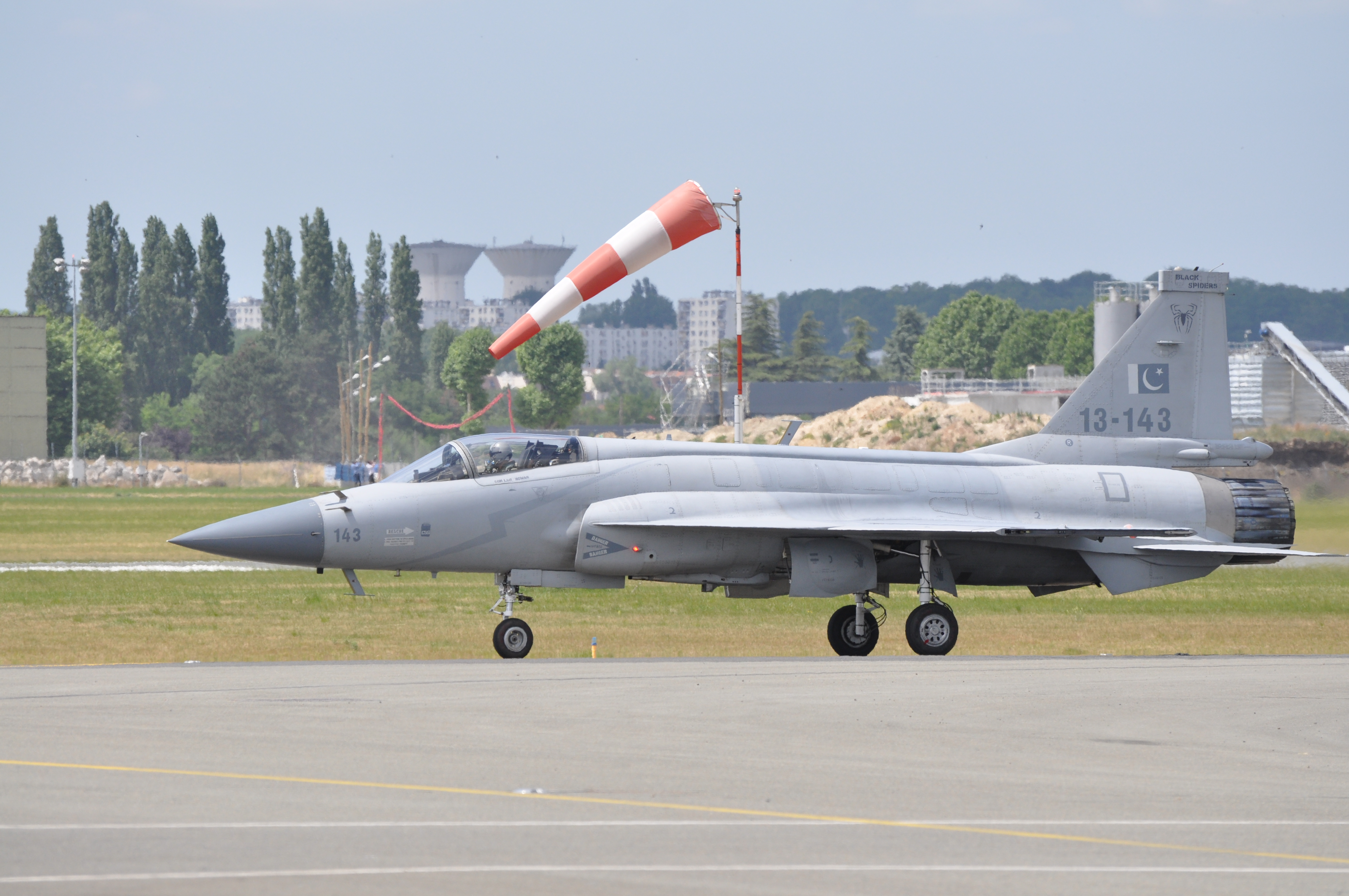
A PAF JF-17 Block 1 at the Le Bourget Airport, Paris, France for the 2015 Paris Air Show

On 2 March 2007, the first consignment of two small-batch-production (SBP) aircraft arrived in a dismantled state in Pakistan. They flew for the first time on 10 March 2007 and took part in a public aerial demonstration during a Pakistan Day parade on 23 March 2007. The PAF intended to induct 200 JF-17 by 2015 to replace all its Chengdu F-7, Nanchang A-5, and Dassault Mirage III/5 aircraft. In preparation for the in-flight refuelling of JF-17s, the PAF has upgraded several Mirage IIIs with IFR probes for training purposes. A dual-seat, combat-capable trainer was originally scheduled to begin flight testing in 2006; in 2009 Pakistan reportedly decided to develop the training model into a specialised attack variant.

In November 2007, the PAF and PAC conducted flight evaluations of aircraft fitted with a variant of the NRIET KLJ-10 radar developed by China's Nanjing Research Institute for Electronics Technology (NRIET), and the LETRI SD-10 active radar homing AAM. In 2005, PAC began manufacturing JF-17 components; production of sub-assemblies commenced on 22 January 2008. The PAF was to receive a further six pre-production aircraft in 2005, for a total of 8 out of an initial production run of 16 aircraft. Initial operating capability was to be achieved by the end of 2008. Final assembly of the JF-17 in Pakistan began on 30 June 2009; PAC expected to complete production of four to six aircraft that year. They planned to produce twelve aircraft in 2010 and fifteen to sixteen aircraft per year from 2011; this could increase to twenty-five aircraft per year. On 29 December 2015, PAC announced the rollout of the 16th JF-17 Thunder fighter manufactured in the calendar year 2015, taking total number of manufactured aircraft to more than 66. Later, a PAF spokesperson said that in light of the interest shown by various countries, it has been decided that production capacity of JF-17 Thunder at PAC Kamra will be expanded.

Russia signed an agreement in August 2007 for re-export of 150 RD-93 engines from China to Pakistan for the JF-17. In 2008, the PAF reported it was not fully satisfied with the RD-93 engine and that it would only power the first 50 aircraft; it was alleged that arrangements for a new engine, reportedly the Snecma M53-P2, may have been made. Mikhail Pogosyan, head of the MiG and Sukhoi design bureaus, recommended the Russian defence export agency Rosoboronexport block RD-93 engine sales to China to prevent export competition from the JF-17 against the MiG-29. At the 2010 Farnborough Airshow, the JF-17 was displayed internationally for the first time; aerial displays at the show were intended but were cancelled due to a late attendance decision as well as licence and insurance costs. According to a Rosoboronexport official at the Airshow China 2010, held on 16–21 November 2005 in Zhuhai, China, Russia and China had signed a contract worth $238 million for 100 RD-93 engines with options for another 400 engines developed for the FC-1.

According to media reports, Pakistan planned to increase production of JF-17s by 25% in 2016.

=== Further development ===
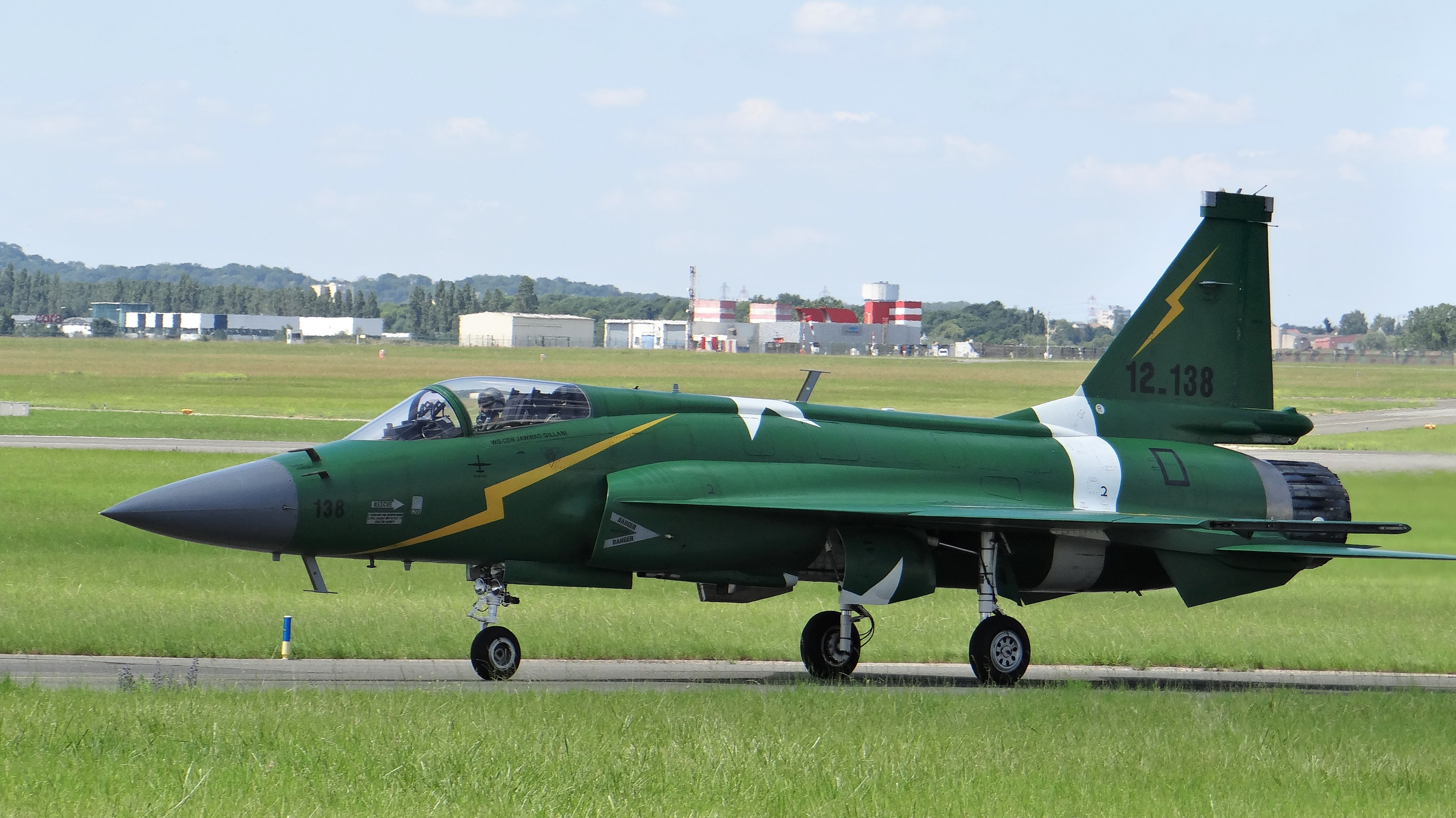
JF 17 Thunder in Pakistan Flag Livery at Paris Air Show

Pakistan negotiated with British and Italian defence firms regarding avionics and radars for the JF-17 development. Radar options include the Italian Galileo Avionica's Grifo S7, the French Thomson-CSF's RC400 (a variant of the RDY-2), and the British company SELEX Galileo's Vixen 500E AESA radar. In 2010, the PAF had reportedly selected ATE Aerospace Group to integrate French-built avionics and weapons systems over rival bids from Astrac, Finmeccanica and a Thales-Sagem joint venture. Fifty JF-17s were to be upgraded and an optional fifty from 2013 onwards, at a cost of up to US$1.36 billion. The RC-400 radar, MICA AAMs, and several air-to-surface weapons are believed to be in the contract. The PAF also held talks with South Africa for the supply of Denel A-darter AAMs.

In April 2010, after eighteen months of negotiations, the deal was reportedly suspended; reports cited French concerns about Pakistan's financial situation, the protection of sensitive French technology, and by Indian lobbying, which operates many French-built aircraft. France wanted the PAF to purchase several Mirage 2000-9 fighters from the United Arab Emirates Air Force, which would overlap with the upgraded JF-17. In July 2010, the PAF's Chief of Air Staff, Air Chief Marshal Rao Qamar Suleman, said such reports were false, stating: "I have had discussions with French Government officials who have assured me that this is not the position of their government...someone was trying to cause mischief—to put pressure on France not to supply the avionics we want".

On 18 December 2013, production of Block 2 JF-17s began at PAC's Kamra facility. These have an air-to-air refuelling capability, improved avionics, enhanced load carrying capacity, data link, and electronic warfare capabilities. Block 2 construction was planned to run until 2016, after which the manufacturing of further developed Block III aircraft was planned. In December 2015, it was announced that the 16th Block II aircraft had been handed over resulting in standing up of the 4th squadron.

On 17 June 2015, Jane's Defence Weekly confirmed that JF-17 Block III will have an AESA radar, a helmet-mounted display (HMD) and possibly an internal infrared search and tracking (IRST) system. A two-seat version was also reportedly to be produced in Block III. Unconfirmed reports claim that Block III will also have a better flight management system. Selex ES has promoted its next-generation cockpit as a possible upgrade of JF-17 Block III; this cockpit includes a new mission computer, an enhanced head-up display and contemporary multi-function displays, plus the capability for the pilot to use a single, large-area display instead.

In July 2020, despite Indian protests, Russian state-owned United Engine Corporation developed a new engine designated RD-93MA for the JF-17 fighter being built by Pakistan.

== Design ==
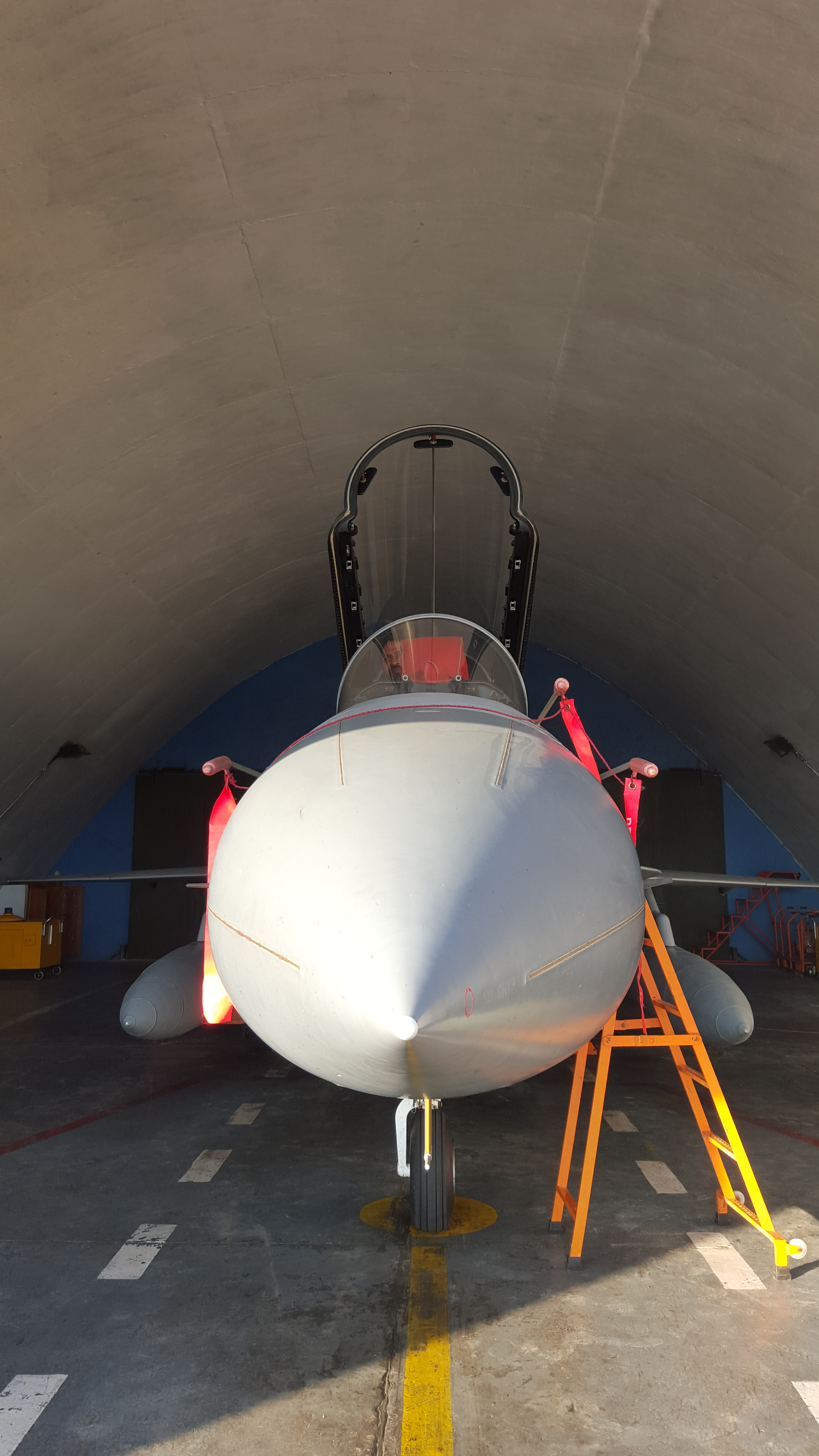
Front View

=== Airframe ===
The airframe is of semi-monocoque structure constructed primarily of aluminium alloys. High-strength steel and titanium alloys are partially adopted in some critical areas. The airframe is designed for a service life of 4,000 flight hours or 25 years, the first overhaul being due at 1,200 flight hours. Block 2 JF-17s incorporate greater use of composite materials in the airframe to reduce weight. The retractable undercarriage has a tricycle arrangement with a single steerable nose-wheel and two main undercarriages. The hydraulic brakes have an automatic anti-skid system. The position and shape of the inlets is designed to give the required airflow to the jet engine during manoeuvrees involving high angles of attack.

The mid-mounted wings are of cropped-delta configuration. Near the wing root are the LERX, which generate a vortex that provides extra lift to the wing at high angles of attack encountered during combat manoeuvrees. A conventional tri-plane empennage arrangement is incorporated, with all-moving stabilators, single vertical stabiliser, rudder, and twin ventral fins. The flight control system (FCS) comprises conventional controls with stability augmentation in the yaw and roll axis and a digital fly-by-wire (FBW) system in the pitch axis. The leading-edge slats/flaps and trailing edge flaps are automatically adjusted during manoeuvring to increase turning performance. The FCS of serial production aircraft reportedly have a digital quadruplex (quad-redundant) FBW system in the pitch axis and a duplex (dual-redundant) FBW system in the roll and yaw axis.

Up to 3,400 lb (1,500 kg) of ordnance, equipment, and fuel can be mounted under the hardpoints, two of which are on the wing-tips, four are under the wings and one is under the fuselage.

=== Cockpit ===
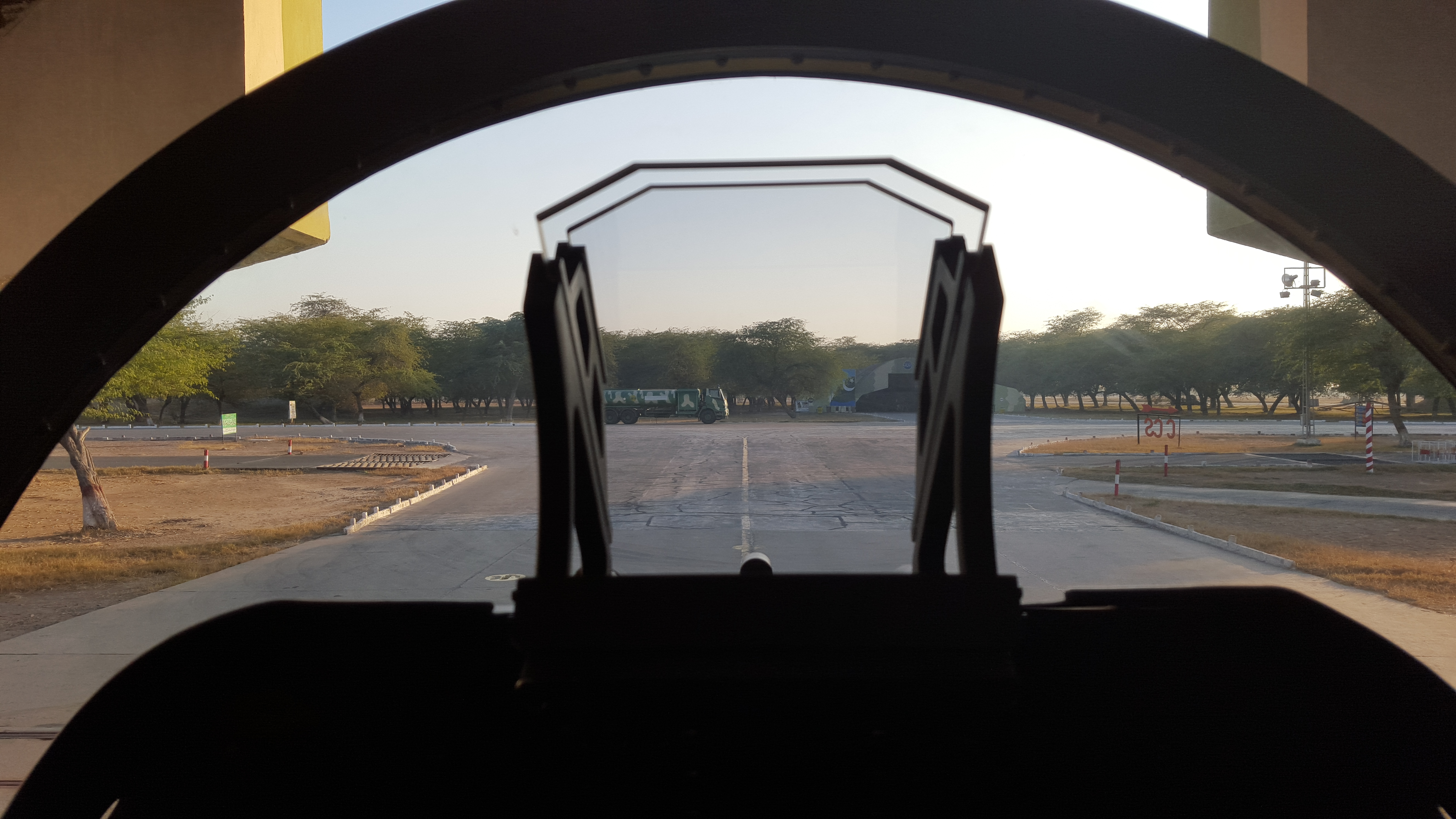
JF-17 Block 1 HUD

The aircraft has three large Multifunction Colour Displays (MFD) and smart Heads-Up Display (HUD) with built-in symbol generation capability. A center stick is used for pitch and roll control while rudder pedals control yaw. A throttle is located to the left of the pilot. The cockpit incorporates hands-on-throttle-and-stick (HOTAS) controls. The pilot sits on a Martin-Baker Mk-16LE zero-zero ejection seat. The cockpit incorporates an electronic flight instrument system (EFIS) and a wide-angle, holographic head-up display (HUD), which has a minimum total field of view of 25 degrees. The EFIS comprises three color multi-function displays, providing basic flight information, tactical information, and information on the engine, fuel, electrical, hydraulics, flight control, and environment control systems. The HUD and MFD can be configured to show any available information. Each MFD is 20.3 cm (8.0 in) wide and 30.5 cm (12.0 in) tall and is arranged side by side in portrait orientation. The central MFD is placed lowest to accommodate a control panel between it and the HUD.

=== Avionics ===
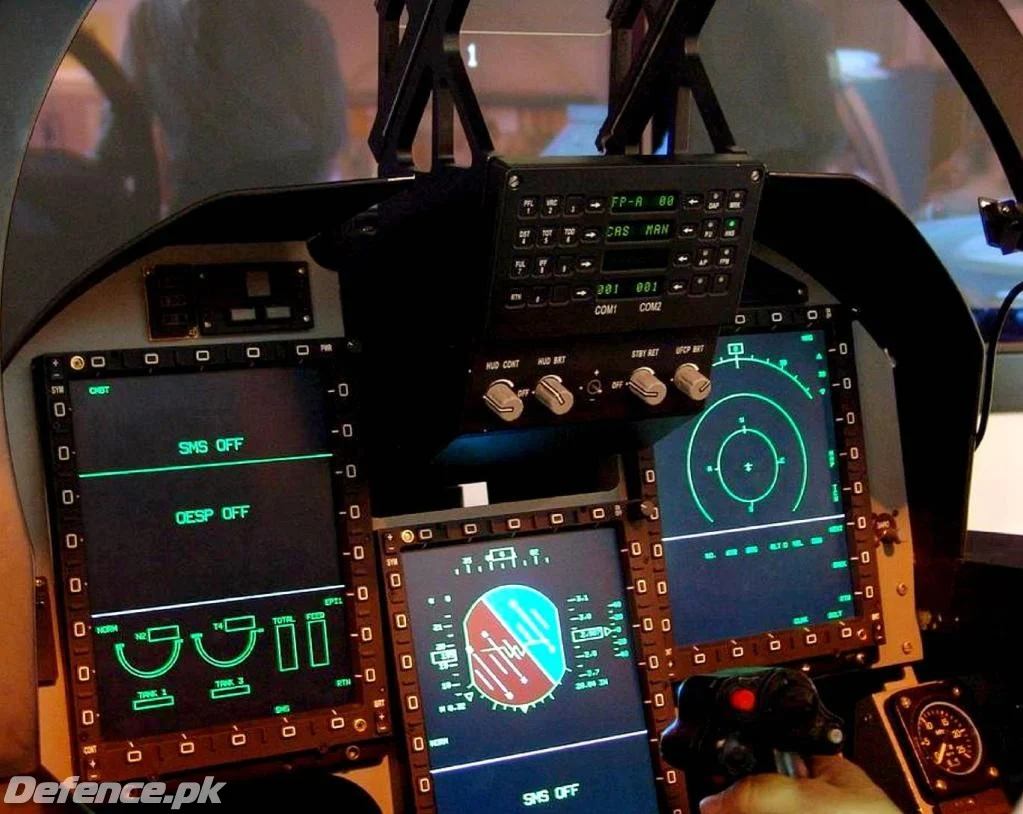
JF-17 Block 1 cockpit avionics display

The avionics software incorporates the concept of open architecture. Instead of the military-optimised Ada programming language, the software is written using the popular C++ programming language, enabling the use of the numerous civilian programmers available. The aircraft also includes a health and usage monitoring system, and automatic test equipment.

The JF-17 has a defensive aids system (DAS) composed of various integrated sub-systems. A radar warning receiver (RWR) provides data such as direction and proximity of enemy radars, and an electronic warfare (EW) suite housed in a fairing at the tip of the tail fin interferes with enemy radars. The EW suite is also linked to a Missile Approach Warning (MAW) system to defend against radar-guided missiles. The MAW system uses several optical sensors across the airframe to detect the rocket motors of missiles across a 360-degree coverage. Data from the MAW system, such as direction of inbound missiles and the time to impact, is shown on cockpit displays and the HUD. A countermeasures dispensing system releases decoy flares and chaff to help evade hostile radar and missiles. The DAS systems will also be enhanced by integration of a self-protection radar-jamming pod that will be carried externally on a hardpoint.

The first forty-two PAF production aircraft are equipped with the NRIET KLJ-7 radar, a variant of the KLJ-10 radar developed by China's Nanjing Research Institute of Electronic Technology (NRIET) and also used on the Chengdu J-10. Multiple modes can manage the surveillance and engagement of up to forty air, ground, and sea targets; the track-while-scan mode can track up to ten targets at BVR and can engage two simultaneously with radar-homing AAMs. The operation range for targets with a radar cross-section (RCS) of 5 m^{2} (54 sq ft) is stated to be ≥ 105 km (65 miles) in look-up mode and ≥ 85 km (53 miles) in look-down mode. A forward looking infrared (FLIR) pod for low-level navigation and infra-red search and track (IRST) system for passive targeting can also be integrated; the JF-17 Block 2 is believed to incorporate an IRST. In April 2016, Air Marshal Muhammad Ashfaque Arain said that, "JF-17 needs a targeting pod, as the jets' usefulness in current operations was limited due to lack of precision targeting. To fulfill this gap the Air Force was interested in buying the Thales-made Damocles, a third-generation targeting pod; which was a priority." In 2017, Aselsans ASELPOD was tested and successfully integrated with the JF-17 and Pakistan has subsequently purchased at least eight targeting pods from Aselsan. This integration has significantly enhanced the JF-17 platform's ability to launch precision strikes.

A helmet-mounted sight (HMS) developed by Luoyang Electro-Optics Technology Development Centre of AVIC was developed in parallel with the JF-17; it was first tested on Prototype 04 in 2006. It was dubbed as EO HMS, (Electro-Optical Helmet Mounted Sight) and was first revealed to the public in 2008 at the 7th Zhuhai Airshow, where a partial mock-up was on display. The HMS tracks the pilot's head and eye movements to guide missiles towards the pilot's visual target. An externally carried day/night laser designator targeting pod may be integrated with the avionics to guide laser-guided bombs (LGBs). An extra hardpoint may be added under the starboard air intake, opposite the cannon, for such pods. To reduce the numbers of targeting pods required, the aircraft's tactical data link can transmit target data to other aircraft not equipped with targeting pods. The communication systems comprise two VHF/UHF radios; the VHF radio has the capacity for data linking for communication with ground control centers, airborne early warning and control aircraft and combat aircraft with compatible data links for network-centric warfare, and improved situation awareness. The aircraft uses RLGs along with GPS for navigation. The aircraft is equipped with an IFF Transponder which allows it to differentiate between friendly aircraft and enemy aircraft. The ACMI aids in aerial combat for manoeuvring.

=== Engine ===
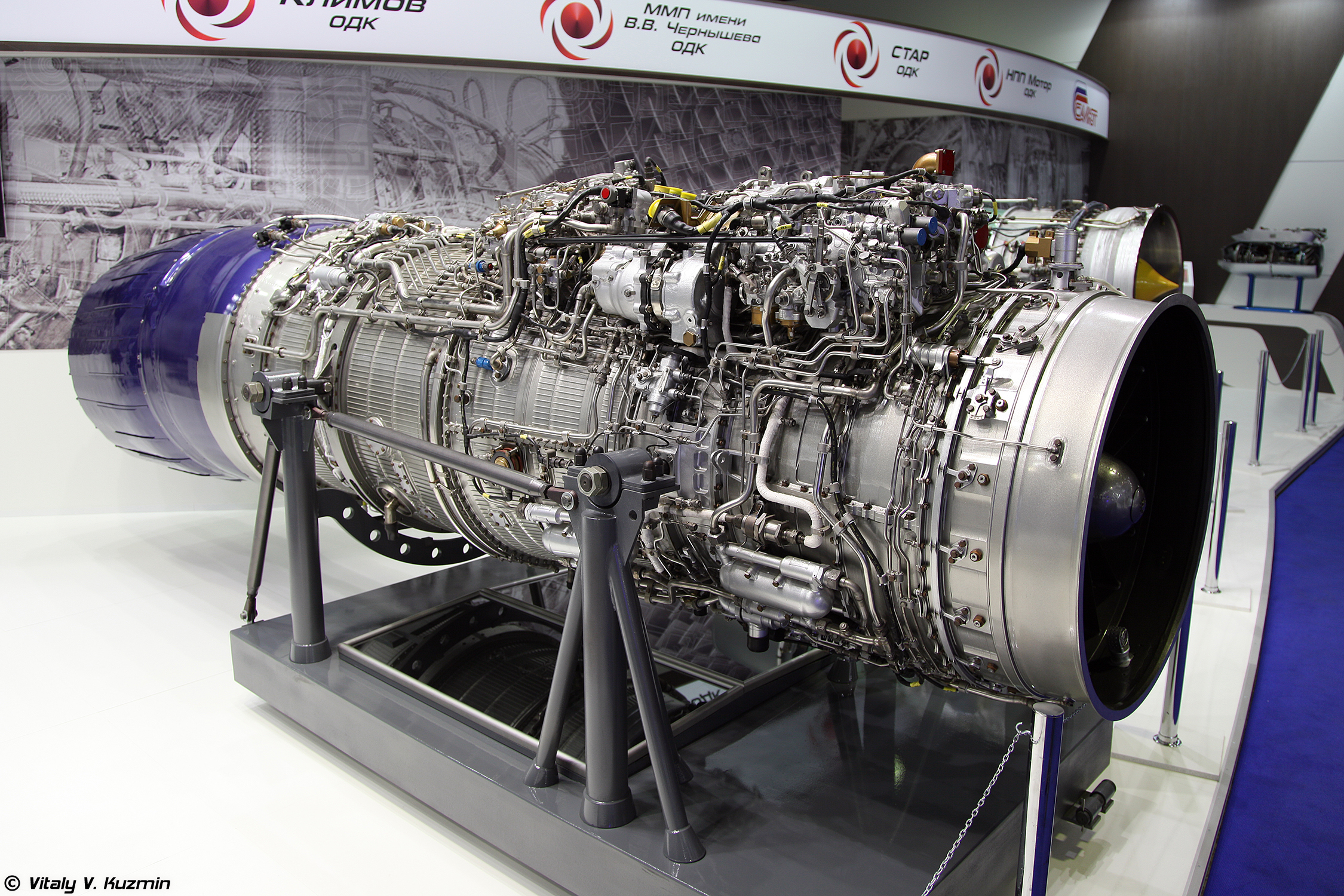
The JF-17 Block 1 & 2 used the RD-93 which is a newer variant of the above shown RD-33.

The first two blocks of JF-17 is powered by a single Russian RD-93 turbofan engine, which is a variant of the Klimov RD-33 engine used on the MiG-29 fighter. The engine gives more thrust and significantly lower specific fuel consumption than turbojet engines fitted to older combat aircraft being replaced by the JF-17. The advantages of using a single engine are a reduction in maintenance time and cost when compared to twin-engined fighters. A thrust-to-weight ratio of 0.99 can be achieved with full internal fuel tanks and no external payload. The engine's air supply is provided by two bifurcated air inlets (see airframe section). The RD-93 is known to produce smoke trails. The Guizhou Aero Engine Group has been developing a new turbofan engine, the WS-13 Taishan, since 2000 to replace the RD-93. It is based on the RD-33 and incorporates new technologies to boost performance and reliability. A thrust output of 80 to 86.36 kN (17,980 to 19,410 lb_{f}), a lifespan of 2,200 hours, and a thrust-to-weight ratio of 8.7 are expected. An improved version of the WS-13, developing a thrust of around 100 kN (22,000 lb_{f}) (22,450 lb), is also reportedly under development. During the 2015 Paris Air Show, it was announced that flight testing of a JF-17 equipped with the WS-13 engine had begun. In 2015, a representative of PAC said that Pakistan would continue to use the RD-93 engine on their fighters. Local media reports in January 2016 said that Russia was planning to sell engines for JF-17 directly to Pakistan. According to a PAC representative, Pakistan is looking to collaborate with Russia in developing and repairing engines.

=== Fuel system ===
The fuel system comprises internal fuel tanks located in the wings and fuselage with a capacity of 2,330 kg (5,140 lb); they are refuelled through a single point pressure refuelling system (see turbine fuel systems). Internal fuel storage can be supplemented by external fuel tanks. One 800-litre (180 imp gal) drop tank can be mounted on the aircraft's centerline hard point under the fuselage and two 800-litre or 1,110-litre (240 imp gal) drop tanks can be mounted on the two inboard under-wing hardpoints. The fuel system is compatible with in-flight refuelling (IFR), allowing tanker aircraft to refuel inflight, and increasing its range and loitering time significantly. All production aircraft for the PAF are to be fitted with IFR probes. In June 2013, PAF Air Chief Marshal Tahir Rafique Butt said ground tests on the JF-17's refuelling probes had been successfully completed and the first mid-air refuelling operations would commence that summer.

=== Armaments ===
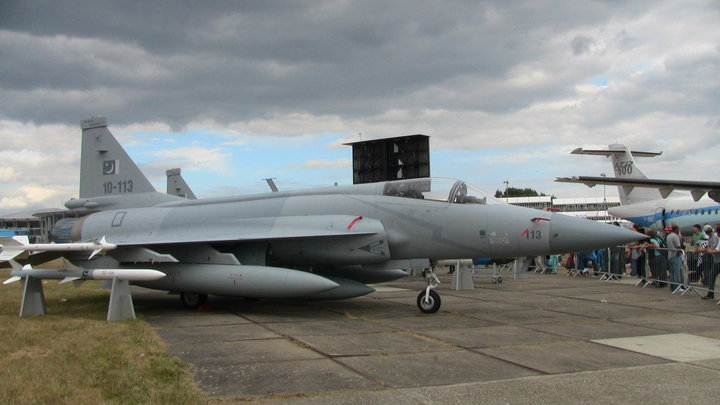
JF-17 Thunder with its weapons

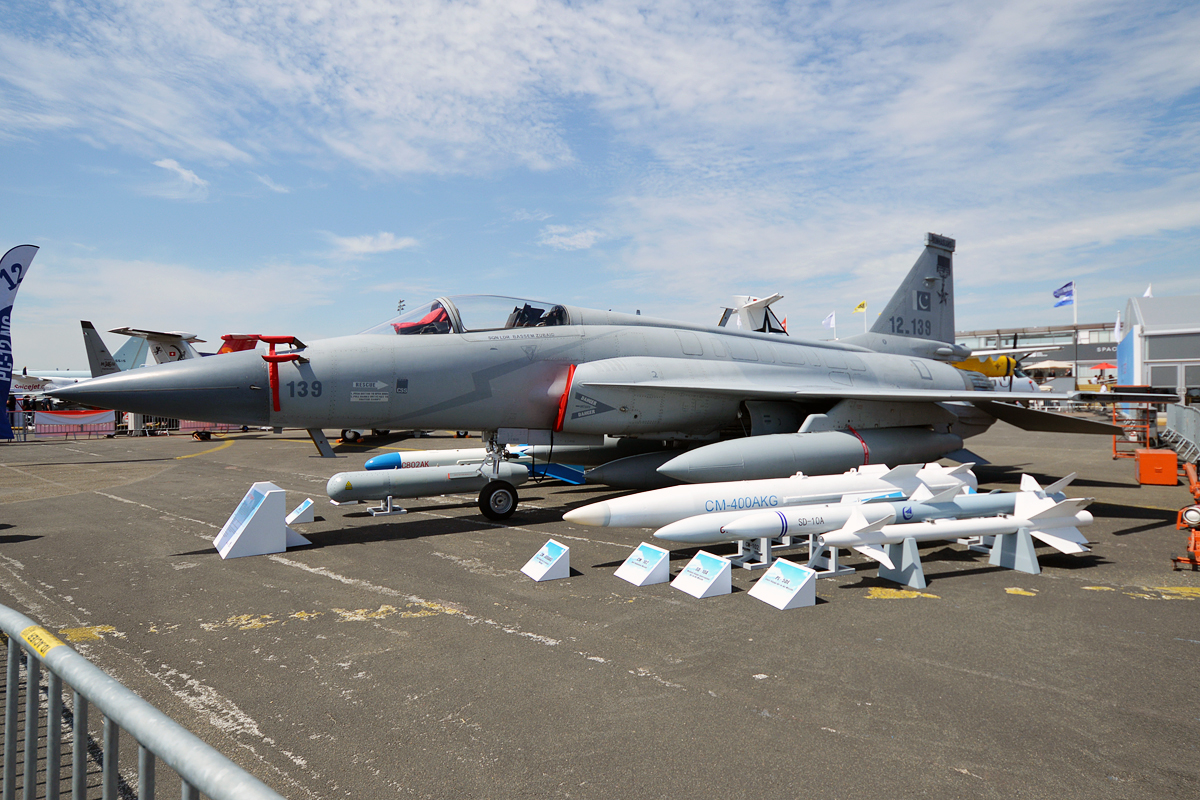
Thunder with weapons

The JF-17 can be armed with up to 3,400 lb (1,500 kg) of air-to-air and air-to-ground weaponry, and other equipment mounted externally on the aircraft's seven hardpoints. One hardpoint is located under the fuselage between the main landing gear, two are underneath each wing, and one is at each wing-tip. All seven hardpoints communicate via a MIL-STD-1760 data-bus architecture with the Stores Management System, which is stated to be capable of integration with weaponry of any origin. Internal armament comprises one 23 mm (0.91 in) GSh-23-2 twin-barrel cannon mounted under the port side air intake, which can be replaced with a 30 mm (1.2 in) GSh-30-2 twin-barrel cannon.

The wing-tip hard-points are typically occupied by short range infra-red homing AAMs. Many combinations of ordnance and equipment such as targeting pods can be carried on the under-wing and under-fuselage hard-points. Underwing hard-points can be fitted with multiple ejector racks, allowing each hard-point to carry two 500 lb (230 kg) unguided bombs or LGBs—Mk.82 or GBU-12. Active radar homing BVR AAMs can be integrated with the radar and data-link for mid-course updates. The aircraft can carry the PL-12/SD-10 along with the PL-5E and PL-9C Short range, infra-red homing missiles. The more advanced PL-10E High-Off Bore Sight missiles were integrated into the aircraft in April 2021, operated Within Visual Range using the HMD/S. With the Block 3 variant of the JF-17, the ability to fit and operate the PL-15E, the most advanced BVR missile developed by China for export with a claimed operating range of 145 km (90 mi, 78 nmi) is also integrated.

Unguided air-to-ground weaponry includes rocket pods, gravity bombs and Matra Durandal anti-runway munitions. Precision-guided munitions such as LGBs and satellite-guided bombs are also compatible with the JF-17, as are other guided weapons such as anti-ship missiles and anti-radiation missiles. Pakistan planned to bring the Brazilian MAR-1 anti-radiation missile into service on its JF-17 fleet in 2014.

== Operational history ==
=== Pakistan ===
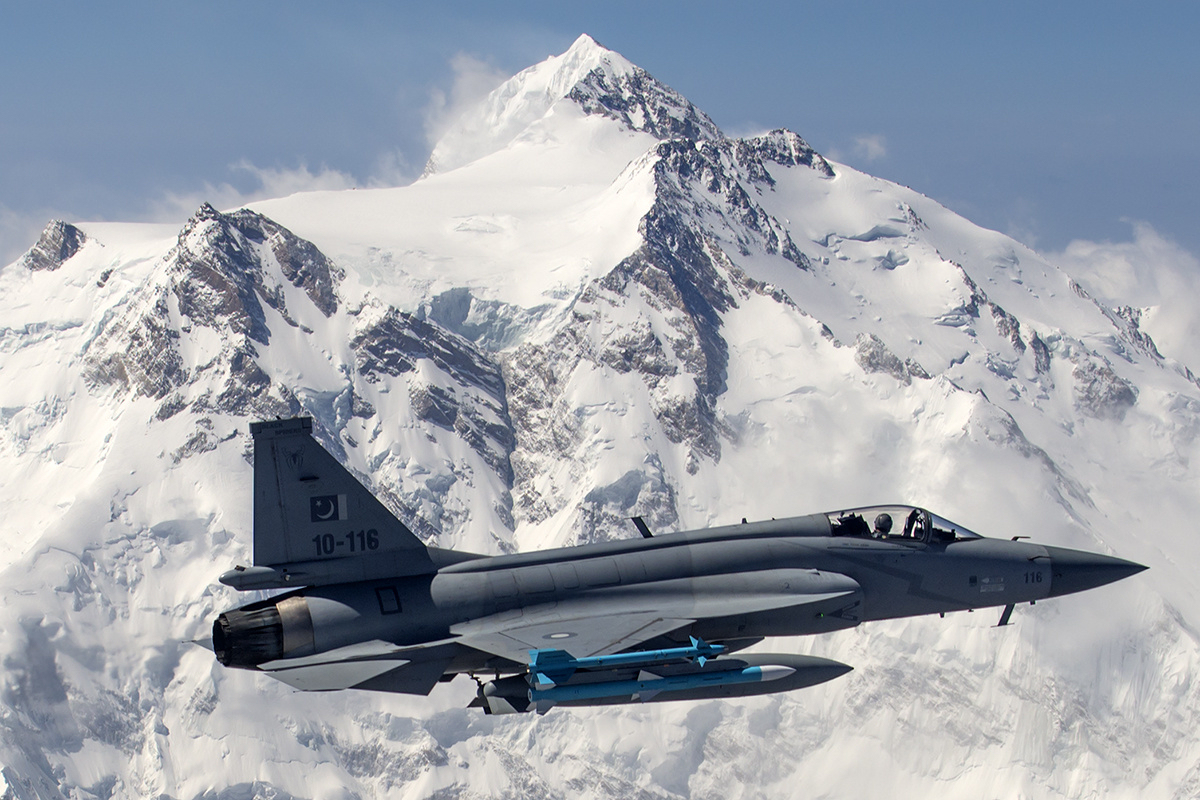
Pakistan Air Force JF-17 flies in front of the 26,660 ft high Nanga Parbat

Small batch production of the single-seat, single-engine JF-17s began in China in June 2006. The first two small-batch-produced aircraft were delivered on 2 March 2007 and first flew in Pakistan on 10 March. They took part in an aerial display on 23 March 2007 as part of the Pakistan Day Joint Services Parade in Islamabad.< Another six small-batch-produced aircraft were delivered by March 2008. These were extensively flight-tested and evaluated by the PAF. Two serial production aircraft were delivered from China in 2009 and the first Pakistani-manufactured aircraft was delivered to the PAF in a ceremony on 23 November 2009.

On 18 February 2010, the first JF-17 squadron, No. 26 Black Spiders, was officially inducted into the PAF with an initial strength of 14 fighter planes. These aircraft first saw service in the anti-terrorist operation in South Waziristan, during which various types of weapons were evaluated. They took part in the PAF's High Mark 2010 exercise from 29 April, where they were used by the Blue Force to attack Red Land surface targets with precision air-to-surface weapons.

On 11 April 2011, a re-equipment ceremony for No. 26 Black Spiders Squadron took place, during which it was stated that the JF-17 had "revolutionized the PAF's operational concepts". Then Air Chief Marshal Rao Qamar Suleman reported the re-equipping of No. 26 squadron and the addition of the JF-17 Thunder to the No. 16 Squadron. He also thanked the contribution and support of the Chinese in helping to acquire a technological breakthrough in the shape of the aircraft.

During Operation Zarb-e-Azb 2014–2016, JF-17 were deployed frequently to carry out airstrikes against TTP hideouts, killing hundreds of terrorists.

In September 2015, the No. 2 Squadron tasked with sea strikes was re-equipped with JF-17s replacing the F7s. The No. 16 Squadron "Black Panthers" has also been equipped with the JF-17.

On 19 June 2017, it was reported that a JF-17 shot down an Iranian UAV operating in Pakistan's Pangjur District.

In February 2019, PAF JF-17s took part in Pakistan's retaliatory airstrikes against India during which two Thunders of the No. 16 Squadron struck Indian ground targets with Mk. 83 REKs. According to reports, as of March 2021, JF-17s are operational in seven fighter squadrons based at five airbases. Pakistan also Claimed to Shot down an Indian MIG 21 Bison using JF-17 but India maintained that the MiG-21 was actually shot down by a Pakistani F-16.

In March 2023, the first batch of JF-17 Block 3 aircraft were inducted into the PAF.

During the May 2025 India–Pakistan conflict, the PAF publicly showcased, for the first time, a JF-17 Block 3 fighter aircraft equipped with PL-15E long-range beyond-visual-range air-to-air missiles (BVRAAMs). During the conflict, the PAF deployed JF-17s and J-10CEs in combat in both the air-to-air and air-to-ground roles. Pakistan claimed that its JF-17 successfully targeted and destroyed an Indian S-400 missile defence system at Adampur Air Force Station in Punjab on 10 May 2025 using two CM-400AKG long-range supersonic air-to-surface missiles. On 11 May, the PAF, in a press briefing said that it had targeted the 96L6E Cheese Board radar of the S-400 system, one of the units of the combined air defence system. India's Ministry of External Affairs dismissed the claim, stating that all Indian S-400 squadrons are still functional. Indian Prime Minister Narendra Modi visited the Adampur Air Force Station on 13 May 2025, and posed in front of an S-400 Launcher, which the Indian media claimed to be fully operational. According to Indian media, his visit served as a rebuttal to Pakistan's claims, reinforcing that the missile system was intact and operational, though Pakistan never claimed to have targeted the launcher itself.

Following the 2026 Iran war ceasefire in April 2026, Indian media sources reported that the Pakistan Air Force had mobilised its JF-17 and F-16 fighters, as well as Il-78 tankers and C-130 cargo planes. The fighters are expected to fly an escort mission for the Iranian representatives and the PAF set up a protective shield over Iran and the Persian Gulf for the Iranian delegation to travel to Islamabad for further negotiations with the United States. Reuters also confirmed the escort mission, and reported it involved around 20 aircraft including the J-10 and unspecified AEWACS but made no mention of the JF-17.

During 2026 Iran war between US, Israel and Iran and heightened tensions in Middle East, Pakistan deployed squadron of JF-17 consisted of 16 jets at King Abdul Aziz Base to ensure defence of Saudi Arabia under Strategic Mutual Defence Agreement under which both states Pakistan and Saudi Arabia are mutually obliged to defend each other.

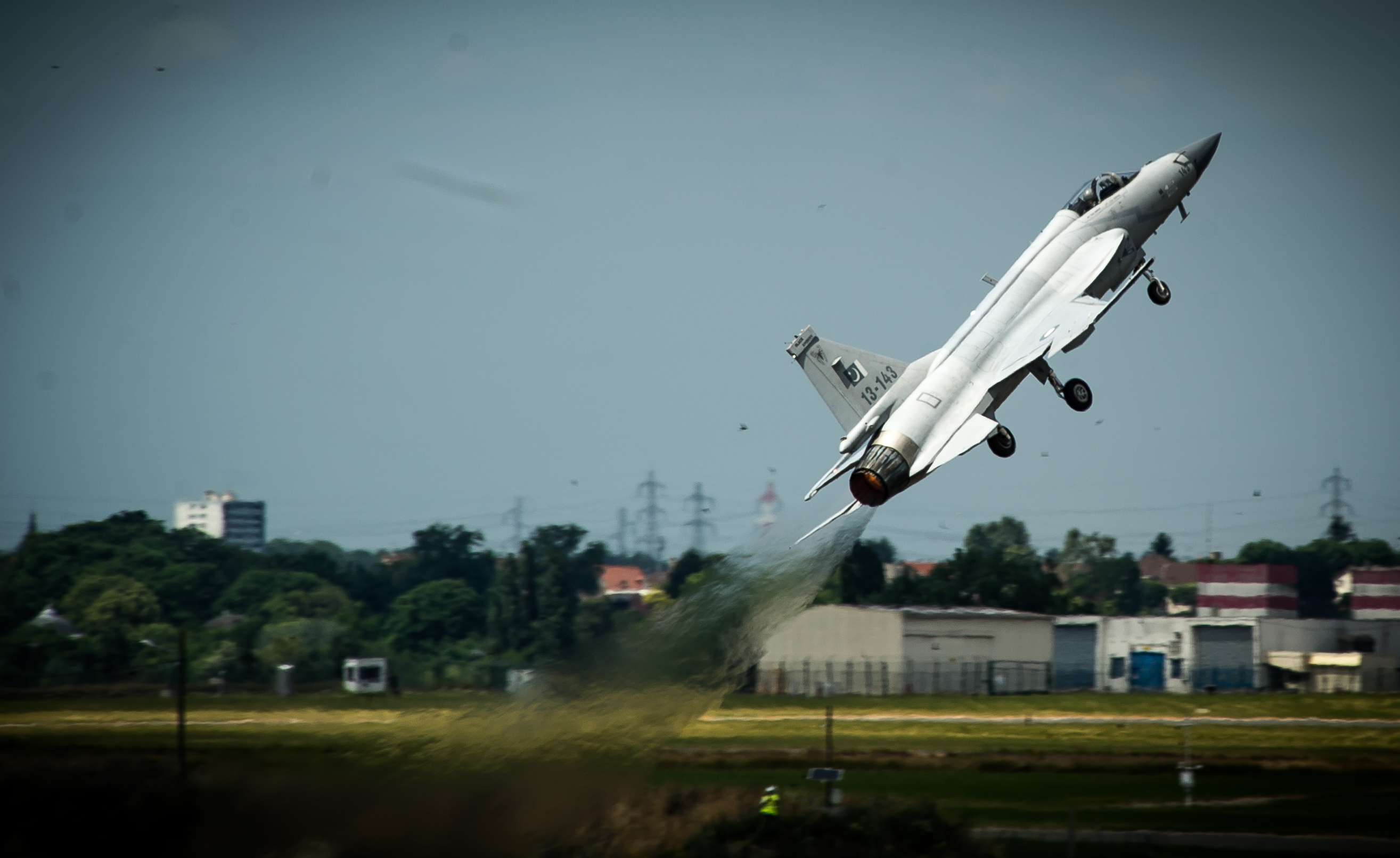
Pakistan Air Force JF-17 at Paris Air Show 2015

Exercises

The PAF has deployed the JF-17 Thunder in a number of bilateral and multinational air exercises since the 2010s. PAF JF-17s have participated in joint air exercises with the People's Liberation Army Air Force (PLAAF) under the Shaheen exercise series since at least 2014, focusing on air combat training and interoperability. In 2019 and again in 2021, PAF JF-17s took part in the Turkish Air Force–hosted multinational exercise Anatolian Eagle, operating alongside aircraft from several participating air forces. In 2022, PAF JF-17s participated in the Saudi-led multinational air exercise Spears of Victory at King Abdulaziz Air Base, flying alongside Royal Saudi Air Force Tornados, Typhoons and F-15s, as well as allied aircraft. JF-17s continued participation in subsequent editions of Spears of Victory, including 2023 and 2025, with later deployments featuring the Block-III variant. In 2025, PAF JF-17 Block-III fighters were also deployed to Azerbaijan for the bilateral air exercise Indus Shield Alpha, marking one of the type's longest overseas deployments.

Airshows

The JF-17 Thunder has participated in international airshows since 2010 as part of export promotion and military diplomacy efforts by the PAF. Early public appearances took place at airshows in Pakistan and China, followed by displays at major international aerospace exhibitions, including the Paris Air Show in 2011 and 2015, the Dubai Airshow in 2013, 2017, 2021, and 2025 and the Farnborough International Airshow in 2014 and 2016, primarily as static displays. The aircraft has also featured at the China International Aviation & Aerospace Exhibition, including static and flying displays, with later editions showcasing the Block III variant. In 2019, 2022, and 2025, PAF JF-17s participated in the Royal International Air Tattoo (RIAT), in static and air displays. The aircraft was also displayed at the World Defense Show in 2024.

=== Myanmar ===
In July 2015, Myanmar ordered 16 Block 2 JF-17s from Pakistan and China for approximately $560 million. In late 2015, Myanmar ordered 16 RD-93 spare engines from Russia, which were received in 2018 and 2019. On 17 December 2018, Jane's disclosed that the Myanmar Air Force had received the first batch of JF-17s. An official Myanmar Air Force video released on Air Force day showcased a number of JF-17s, both on static display and in the air. As per reports, the Myanmar Air Force is in possession 11 JF-17 Block 2s.

In May 2022, a PAF cargo plane supplied spare parts for the JF-17s of the Myanmar Air Force. In June 2022, it was reported that a team of 15 PAF personnel were scheduled to visit Meiktila Air Base in Myanmar to provide technical support for the Myanmar Air Force JF-17s, including setting up of a JF-17 simulator at Meiktila Air Base to train pilots of the Myanmar Air Force and to address technical issues relating to JF-17s that Myanmar Air Force was facing.

In November 2022, the Myanmar anti-junta news website The Irrawaddy claimed that most of the aircraft had been grounded due to technical malfunctions, citing unnamed analysts and Myanmar Air Force pilots. The article specified that the sources reported that the aircraft have structural cracks, and poor perceived performance of the KLJ-7 radar. The grounding was exacerbated by post-2021 military coup sanctions, which restricted access to spare parts for Western-sourced components in the avionics and electronics. Myanmar lacked the local expertise to maintain or repair the complex systems, and initial attempts by Pakistani technicians in September 2022 to set up a simulator at Pathein air base and resolve issues were only partially successful.

In 2023, Pakistan had reportedly sent a team of engineers and technicians to Myanmar to help repair and maintain its JF-17s.

=== Nigeria ===
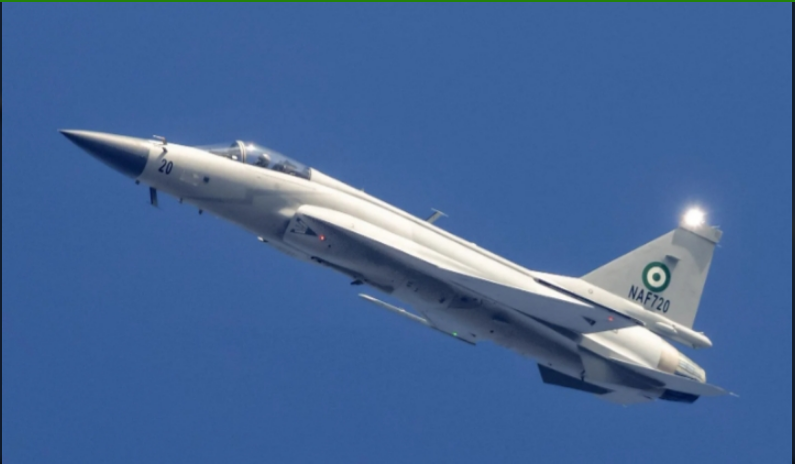
Nigerian Air Force JF-17 Block 2

In December 2014, during the International Defence Exhibition and Seminar in Karachi, Nigeria was reportedly buying between 25 and 40 JF-17s from Pakistan. Nigerian Air Force (NAF) chief Air Marshal Adesola Nunayon Amosu had visited Pakistan earlier in October 2014. Nigeria became the second customer in 2016 by placing an order for three planes. However, as the news reports value the deal at US$25 million, it is not clear if the item is misreported. A June 2016 article in Jane's re-affirmed NAF budget for 3 JF-17, 10 Super Mushshak, and 2 Mi-35M aircraft in 2016. With a confirmation from the Nigerian Air Force shortly after.

In October 2018 Pakistan approved of the sale and local Nigerian production of three JF-17s for US$184.3 million. The aircraft are rumoured to be of a later version than the initially agreed sale, providing more advanced systems.

On 30 December 2020 the Pakistan Aeronautical Complex rolled out the three JF-17A Block 2s for Nigeria. They were delivered to Makurdi Air Base in March 2021 aboard Pakistan Air Force Ilyushin Il-78MP freighters and were formally inducted into the Nigerian Air Force on 21 May 2021.

The NAF initially indicated that it might order another 35–40 aircraft if the type met its requirements. In January 2023 the Chief of the Air Staff, Air Marshal Isiaka Oladayo Amao, confirmed that the JF-17s had been used in anti-terrorism and anti-insurgency operations inside Nigeria. In early December 2025 the three aircraft were reportedly deployed to the Benin Republic, where they conducted airstrikes against rebel forces during an attempted coup.

=== Azerbaijan ===
In January 2008, Azerbaijan engaged in talks with Pakistan over JF-17's possible sale to Azerbaijan. In 2015, the Azerbaijani Air Forces negotiated with China for several dozen JF-17s worth approximately US$16 to 18 million each. In 2018, Pakistani Armed Forces actively discussed military and defence cooperation with Azerbaijan, culminating in the latter expressing an interest in purchasing the JF-17 Thunder fighter jet. On 22 February 2024, Azerbaijan had signed a contract worth US$1.6 billion with Pakistan for the purchase of an unspecified number of JF-17 Block 3 multi-role combat aircraft for the Azerbaijani Air Forces including aircraft, training, and ordnance. On 25 September 2024, the JF-17 Block 3 was showcased to the President of Azerbaijan on the sidelines of 2024 Azerbaijan International Defence Exhibition (AIDEX).

On 6 June 2025, the Government of Pakistan announced that it had secured a contract for the supply of 40 JF-17 Block 3 aircraft from Azerbaijan for $4.6 billion, which builds on an initial agreement signed between Pakistan and Azerbaijan in February 2024, valued at $1.6 billion, for an unspecified number of JF-17 Block 3 fighter jets, alongside training and armaments.

Deliveries of the initial tranche began in October 2025, with the aircraft arriving at Nasosnaya Air Base and undergoing familiarization before formal induction. On 8 November 2025, five JF-17s (four single-seat and one twin-seat), flown by Azeri fighter pilots, participated in Azerbaijan's Victory Day parade in Baku, marking their first public appearance in Azerbaijani service. In addition, open-source images circulated showing a total of nine JF-17 Block III aircraft present in Azerbaijan around the same period without any national markings, consistent with jets observed during early post-delivery handling and marking transitions.

In July 2026, Azerbaijan MOD officially released multiple footages of Azerbaijani JF-17 block 3s and JF-17B being operational under the 408th squadron "Jaguars", Participating in exercises alongside Su25s. Confirming the induction of JF-17s into Azerbaijani service.

=== Potential customers ===
==== Bangladesh ====
In January 2025, Bangladesh announced an interest in purchasing the JF-17C Block 3. In January 2026, it was reported that Bangladesh was in formal talks with Pakistan for the purchase of an unspecified number of JF-17C Block 3 fighters.

==== Indonesia ====
Reuters reported that Pakistan is in discussion with Indonesia on selling the JF-17s to the latter. In January 2026, Indonesia's Defence Minister Sjafrie Sjamsoeddin held talks in Islamabad with PAF Chief, Air Chief Marshal Zaheer Ahmed Baber Sidhu, during which a potential defence cooperation package—including the possible acquisition of around 40 JF-17 fighter aircraft, armed drones, and associated training—was discussed, though no binding agreement was announced at the time.

==== Iraq ====
Iraq has expressed interest in acquiring the JF-17C Thunder multirole combat aircraft from Pakistan as part of efforts to modernise the Iraqi Air Force. During an official visit to Baghdad on 10 January 2026, Pakistan's Air Chief Marshal Zaheer Ahmed Baber Sidhu met with Lieutenant General Staff Pilot Mohanad Ghalib Mohammed Radi Al-Asadi, Commander of the Iraqi Air Force, where discussions covered bilateral air force cooperation. During the meeting, the Iraqi Air Force Commander indicated interest in the JF-17C fighter aircraft and Super Mushshak trainer aircraft in the context of training, capacity building, and defence cooperation.

==== Libya ====
It was reported on 22 December 2025 that Pakistan reached a $4–4.6 billion deal with the Libyan National Army, commanded by Khalifa Haftar, which controls eastern Libya, for the supply of 16 JF-17s and other military equipment.

==== Morocco ====
Morocco has shown interest in the JF-17, having invited a sales team to showcase it in the Marrakech Air Show 2016. According to a local analyst, a potential acquisition by Morocco may be complicated by incompatible technologies; the JF-17 Block I and Block II have broadly different electronics suites and air-to-air & air-to-surface munitions than its current Western-sourced aircraft, such as the Mirage F-1 (MF2000), F-5E/F Tiger II and Alpha Jet.

Morocco has been engaged with Pakistan in January 2026 on the JF-17.

==== Saudi Arabia ====
In January 2014, the Royal Saudi Air Force was reportedly examining potential technology transfer and co-production opportunities for the JF-17. Saudi Deputy Minister of Defence Prince Salman bin Sultan toured the JF-17 project during a visit to Pakistan. However, by 2023, this interest seems to have fallen through, with Saudi Arabia now interested in joining the Anglo-Italian-Japanese Global Combat Air Programme. Reuters reported in January 2026 that Pakistan are in discussion with Saudi Arabia to convert around US$2 billion of Saudi loans to Pakistan into a provision of JF-17s. However it is reported that the US government has discouraged Saudi Arabia from acquisition of both JF-17's and TF Kaan's, instead proposing sale of F-35's to the Saudi Arabian Air Force.

==== Other countries ====
Countries including Egypt, Jordan, Kuwait, Peru, South Africa, Uruguay, and Venezuela have shown interest in the JF-17.

In February 2026, reports appeared that the Somali Air Force was in talks to acquire 24 Block III JF-17s. Somalia's air force has been inactive for many years.

=== Former interests ===
==== Argentina ====
At the 2013 Paris Air Show, officials from Argentine aerospace conglomerate Fábrica Argentina de Aviones (FAdeA) revealed that the firm had held multiple discussions with Chinese officials over a potential co-production of the FC-1/JF-17, for the Argentine Air Force (FAA); this was regarded as the first formal effort by Argentina to possibly procure, or co-produce the aircraft. FAdeA officials said that the co-produced FC-1 could be classified as the "Pulqui-III", with regard to FAdeA's Pulqui-II fighter.

In 2015, following a three-day visit by Argentine president Cristina Fernández de Kirchner to China, Argentina announced that it would consider purchasing around 20 JF-17s from CAIG; however the deal did not materialise.

The primary reason for Argentine interest was reportedly the aircraft's lesser requirement for parts of British origin, as the United Kingdom had barred any sale of military equipment consisting of British-manufactured parts to Argentina since the 1982 Falklands War. Likewise, Argentina's earlier efforts to procure other aircraft, namely, the Mirage F1M, the IAI Kfir, the JAS 39 Gripen and the KAI FA-50 were scuttled due to diplomatic pressure from the United Kingdom, given the aforementioned aircraft were found to contain British-origin parts.

In September 2021, the Argentine government presented a draft budget for the fiscal year of 2022, which contained a request of US$664 million for the acquisition of future fighter aircraft for the FAA. However, multiple media outlets misinterpreted this action, erroneously reporting that the request for funds were for acquiring the JF-17 Block-III. Argentina's Ministry of Defense (Ministerio de Defensa) later clarified that the JF-17 had not been selected, asserting that the FAA was still evaluating five other aircraft as possible options.

In May 2022, a delegation of the FAA evaluated the JF-17 Thunder in China.

However, in October 2023, the United States approved the transfer of 24 second-hand F-16 Block-15 MLU fighters previously owned by the Royal Danish Air Force to Argentina, countering the Chinese offer; reportedly, the deal did not necessitate an approval from the United Kingdom. Following the inauguration of the Javier Milei administration in Argentina in 2023, the decision to select the F-16 had reportedly materialised, leaving the JF-17 out of the contest.

==== Bolivia ====
The JF-17 was a candidate for the replacement of retired Lockheed T-33 aircraft of the Bolivian Air Force.

==== Congo ====
In March 2023, it was reported that China was pitching the JF-17 to the Democratic Republic of the Congo.

==== Malaysia ====
Malaysia had periodically indicated that it may be interested in purchasing the JF-17 for the Royal Malaysian Air Force (RMAF), as part of its efforts to replace its MIG-29 fleet; reports of Malaysian interest in the JF-17 emerged in 2015, although this was later denied.

In March 2019, then-visiting Malaysian PM Mahathir bin Mohammad was accorded an aerial-display of the JF-17's at the 2019 Pakistan Day Parade; he was also briefed about the fighter by the PAF.

In June 2021, the RMAF formally released a tender for the supply of 18 light combat-aircraft — dubbed as the "Fighter Lead In Trainer-Light Combat Aircraft" (FLIT/LCA), in an effort to supplant its ageing BAE Hawk 108/208 light-combat aircraft and its MB-339CM trainer-aircraft. The RMAF later issued a Request for Proposal (RFP) to nine different aircraft-manufacturing conglomerates in July, with a submission-deadline of September 2021 (this would later be extended to October 2021). The JF-17 was widely regarded to be a leading contender in the FLIT/LCA procurement initiative, along with the HAL Tejas and the KAI FA-50.

However, in October 2021, the JF-17 was revealed to have abstained from participating in the FLIT/LCA tender; later reports confirmed that only six companies had responded to the RFP issued by the RMAF - the KAI FA-50 (Korea Aerospace Industries), the HAL Tejas (Hindustan Aeronautics Limited), the HAIC L-15 (China National Aero-Technology Import & Export Corporation), the Aermacchi M-346 (Leonardo S.p.A.), the TAI Hürjet (Turkish Aerospace Industries) and the Mikoyan MiG-35 (Rosoboronexport). The JF-17's unprecedented absence from the FLIT/LCA essentially ended all speculations regarding its participation in Malaysia.

In December 2021, the JF-17 was reportedly re-offered to the RMAF, with an estimated price-discount of about 30%; however, these reports remain unconfirmed. The RMAF eventually declined to purchase the JF-17 and proceeded instead to order 18 FA-50 Block 20 jets in March 2023.

==== Qatar ====
Qatar has shown interest in the JF-17 since 2016. In December 2019, at Qatar's invitation, PAF JF-17s participated in Qatar's National Day Flypast in Doha alongside Qatar Air Force Rafales and Mirage 2000-5s. However, the offer seems to have fallen through, with Qatar ordering a mix of Eurofighter Typhoons and F15Es.

==== Sri Lanka ====
In June 2015, Pakistani media suggested that an export order had been confirmed with the Sri Lanka Air Force; claims were made that the JF-17's first sales contract had been signed with the Sri Lanka Air Force at the 51st Paris Air Show. Other sources claimed that Myanmar is the first buyer of Pakistani JF-17s. Reportedly, the order would cover around 18–24 aircraft and deliveries set to begin in 2017. During a state visit by Nawaz Sharif in January 2016, Sri Lanka reportedly signed an agreement to buy eight JF-17s from Pakistan; however, the Sri Lankan government has issued denials. The alleged deal was said to involve 10–12 aircraft, each valued at US$35 million, for a total of US$400 million Reportedly, any such sale was scuppered by Indian diplomatic pressure. However, in 2021, the Sri Lankan government decided to overhaul their Kfirs instead rather than buying new aircraft, which would cost around $40 million per unit compared to $49 million in total for overhauling all five Kfirs.

==== Zimbabwe ====
The Air Force of Zimbabwe reportedly planned to purchase twelve JF-17s in 2004, as part of a $240 million deal with China. No such sales have materialised. In 2010, China was reportedly in talks about the JF-17 with five or six countries, some of which had sent pilots to China to undergo test flights.

== Variants ==
=== Prototypes ===
In chronological production order:

- PT-01 — First airframe configuration prototype with splitter plates on intakes. Rolled out on 31 May 2003. First flight on 25 August 2003.
- PT-02 — First airframe configuration prototype with splitter plates on intakes.
- PT-03 — First airframe configuration prototype with splitter plates on intakes. First flight in April 2004.
- PT-04 — Second airframe configuration prototype with Diverterless Supersonic Inlets (DSI) and modified vertical stabiliser. First flight on 10 May 2006. PT-04 incorporated modifications such as DSI, wider LERX, extended ventral fins, and a taller, less swept vertical stabiliser with a rectangular fairing at the tip containing electronic warfare equipment and small blister fairings at the base containing Missile Approach Warning sensors. The PT-04 prototype was primarily used for avionics and weapon qualification tests.
- PT-05 — Second airframe configuration prototype with DSI and modified vertical stabiliser.
- PT-06 — Second airframe configuration prototype with DSI and modified vertical stabiliser.

=== Production variants ===
In chronological production order:

- JF-17 Block 1 — Single-seat variant of the JF-17 Thunder. Production in China began in June 2006 and in Pakistan in 2007. The first three Chinese weapons to be integrated are the PL-5E II AAM, the SD-10 AAM, and the C-802AK anti-ship missile. Block 1 aircraft had performed "better than expected" according to PAF Air Commodore Junaid. Production of Block 1 was completed on 18 December 2013 when the fiftieth aircraft—58% of which was produced in Pakistan—was delivered. A Block 1 JF-17 costs approximately US$15 million per unit.
- JF-17 Block 2 — Single-seat variant of the JF-17 Thunder. Production began on 18 December 2013 and initial testing began on 9 February 2015. Block 2 aircraft make use of composites in the airframe for reduced weight, air-to-air refuelling capability, improved radar and avionics, enhanced load carrying capacity, data link, and electronic warfare capabilities. Chairman of PAC, Air Marshal Javaid Ahmed said: "We will hand over 16 Block 2 JF-17s to the PAF every year", and that the manufacturing plant has the capacity to produce 25 units in a year. According to local media, PAC rolled out the 16th Block 2 aircraft in December 2015 enabling the JF-17's 4th squadron formation. A Block 2 JF-17 costs approximately US$25 million per unit.
- JF-17B Block 2 — Dual-seat variant of the JF-17 Thunder. First flight in Chengdu, China on 27 April 2017. Serial production in China and Pakistan from 2018 to 2020. A total of 26 aircraft built - first four at Chengdu and remaining 22 at Kamra. Its multi-roles include use as a (i) JF-17 conversion trainer; (ii) Lead-In Fighter Trainer (LIFT); (iii) ground-attack aircraft; and (iv) reconnaissance aircraft. Apart from the dual-seat, larger dorsal spine, and a more swept-back tail, another difference between the JF-17B and the JF-17 is that the JF-17B carries fuel in its vertical stabiliser, which the JF-17 does not. The JF-17B houses integral fuel tanks like the F-16. Each wing houses 550 Ib while the vertical tail houses 210 lb, which, together with the internal fuel load, totals 4,910 Ib of fuel. Together with the three external fuel drop-tanks, the aircraft can carry a total 10,000 Ib fuel load. The JF-17B Block 2s will be retrofitted with the NRIET/CETC KLJ-7A Air-cooled Airborne Fire-Control Active Electronically Scanned Array (AESA) radar (license-manufactured at the Avionics Production Factory (APF) at PAC, Kamra).
- JF-17 Block 3 — Advanced single-seat variant of the JF-17. First flight in Chengdu, China on 15 December 2019. Two prototypes underwent flight tests as of December 2020, one in China and the other in Pakistan. Went into serial production at PAC Kamra on 30 December 2020. Feature further advancements such as a NRIET/CETC KLJ-7A Air-cooled Airborne Fire-Control Active Electronically Scanned Array (AESA) radar (license-manufactured at the Avionics Production Factory (APF) at PAC, Kamra), a three-axis digital fly-by-wire flight control system, an infrared search and track (IRST) system, a helmet-mounted display and sight (HMD/S) system produced jointly by Pakistan and China, a missile approach warning system (MAWS) similar to the one used on the Chinese J-10C, J-16, and J-20, a new, larger, and thinner holographic wide-angle head-up display (HUD) similar to the one used on the J-10C and J-20, an enhanced electronic warfare management system, a chin-mounted hardpoint, use of more composites for further weight reduction, eventual replacement of the Klimov RD-93MA afterburning turbofan by the Guizhou WS-13 with an increased thrust, and a better thrust-to-weight ratio. The KLJ-7A can simultaneously track 15 targets and engage 4 targets. PAF officials have described the JF-17 Block 3 as a "fourth generation plus" fighter jet. The first PAC-produced JF-17 Block 3 aircraft are expected to roll out of the production line in late 2021. The PAF has placed an order for 50 JF-17 Block 3 aircraft, deliveries of which were expected to start from early 2022. 10 JF-17 Block 3 production aircraft were photographed after their rollout at PAC Kamra in early January 2022. The first batch of JF-17 Block 3 aircraft were inducted into the PAF in March 2023.

Under-Development

- JF-17 Block 4 (PFX-Alpha) — The JF-17 Block 4 or JF-17 (PFX Alpha) is an under-development 4.5+ generation version of the JF-17 Thunder under the PAF "PFX" program, where "PFX" stands for "Pakistan Fighter Experimental." Also known as the JF-17 Operational Capability Upgrade (OCU), the project aims to enhance the JF-17 beyond the capabilities of the current JF-17C Block 3, which is the most advanced variant of the fighter. The PFX-Alpha focuses on improving the radar, avionics, and integrating new air-to-air and air-to-surface munitions, including indigenous weapons. It will feature an indigenously developed passive Infrared Search and Track (IRST) sensor and an electronic warfare (EW) suite with AESA radar-jamming capability. The overall goal of the PFX program is to provide the PAF with a next-generation fighter, with the PFX-Alpha serving as a key step toward indigenization and reducing external dependence. While no official timeline has been announced, a PAF official stated in an interview with Geo News at IDEAS 2024 that the jet is expected to fly within the next 4 to 5 years. At the RIAT 2025 air show, Pakistan showcased a C-130H Hercules with a custom paint job featuring artwork of various PAF aircraft; notably, the PFX was depicted highest on the tail, symbolising the Air Force's strong commitment to the program.

== Operators ==
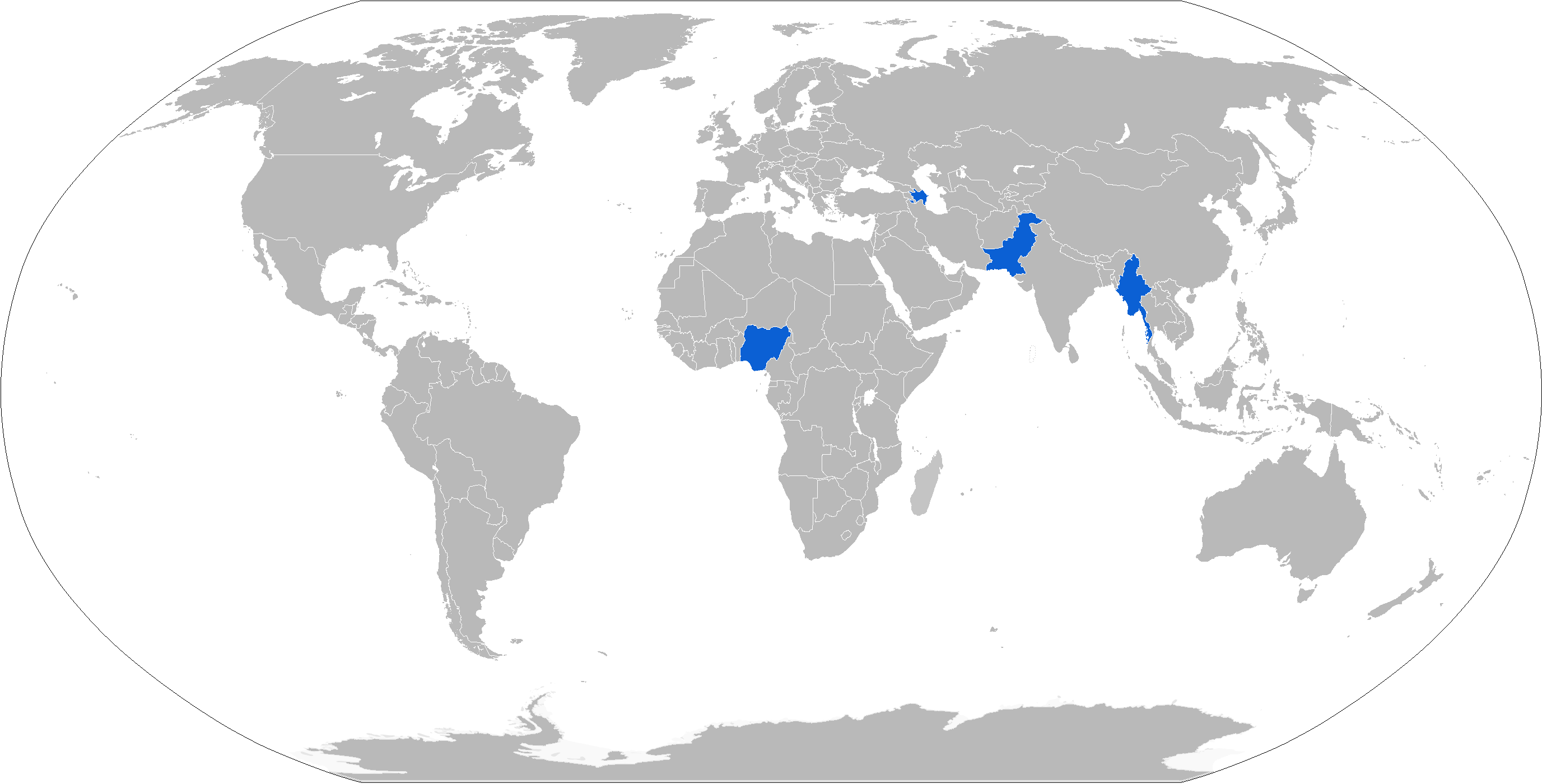
Map with current JF-17 operators in blue

=== Current operators ===
Azerbaijan

- Azerbaijani Air Forces: 9 delivered, 31 on order

Myanmar

- Myanmar Air Force: 13 delivered, 3 on order
  - Meiktila Air Base

Nigeria

- Nigerian Air Force: 3 delivered
  - NAF Base Makurdi

Pakistan

- Pakistan Air Force: 180 delivered, 8 on order
  - PAF Base Bholari (Jamshoro)
    - No. 18 Squadron Sharp Shooters (JF-17 OCU) (2020)
  - PAF Base Masroor (Karachi)
    - No. 2 Squadron Minhasians (2015)
    - No. 8 Squadron Haiders (2024)
  - PAF Base Minhas (Kamra)
    - JF-17 TEF (Test & Evaluation Flight) (2007–2010)
    - No. 16 Squadron Black Panthers (2011)
  - PAF Base Mushaf (Sargodha)
    - CCS JF-17 Squadron Dashings (2015)
  - PAF Base Peshawar
    - No. 26 Squadron Black Spiders (2010)
  - PAF Base Rafiqui (Shorkot)
    - No. 14 Squadron Tail Choppers (2017)
  - PAF Base Samungli (Quetta)
    - No. 28 Squadron Phoenixes (2018)

=== Future operators ===
Libya

- Libyan Air Force: 16 JF-17 Block 3 on order by Libyan National Army

Somalia

- Somali Air Force: 24 JF-17 Block 3 on order following February 2026 negotiations and April 2026 signing.

== Accidents and incidents ==
Since its first flight in 2003 and operationalization in 2007, five JF-17s have crashed in accidents:

- 14 November 2011: A PAF JF-17 Block 1 aircraft crashed during a routine training flight in the mountainous Mullan Mansoor region of Attock District in the Punjab Province while flying from PAF Base Minhas. According to the official PAF report, the crash was caused by a technical malfunction. Pakistani news reported that the pilot, Squadron Leader Muhammad Hussain, ejected but was killed after his parachute failed to open, and that there were no civilian casualties reported on the ground. The pilot's body was discovered two kilometres from the crash site. This was the first known crash of a JF-17.
- 27 September 2016: A PAF JF-17 Block 1 aircraft crashed during Exercise High Mark in the Arabian Sea. The pilot ejected successfully and was rescued from the sea. Martin-Baker, the manufacturer of the JF-17's ejection seats, later tweeted that the 15 September 2020 crash was the first ejection from a JF-17.
- 15 September 2020: A PAF JF-17 Block 1 aircraft crashed during a routine training flight near Pindigheb, Attock District in the Punjab Province. The pilot ejected successfully and no loss of life was reported on the ground. While the PAF did not identify the aircraft, ejection seat manufacturer Martin-Baker, whose seats are installed in the JF-17, said in a Twitter post, "a Pakistan Air Force JF-17 aircraft crashed earlier today during a routine training mission, the pilot ejected successfully," adding that this marked the first instance of an ejection from a JF-17 aircraft, which uses its Martin-Baker PK16LE ejection seats.
- 6 August 2021: A PAF JF-17B Block 2 aircraft crashed during a routine training flight in Attock District in the Punjab Province. Both pilots ejected successfully and no loss of life was reported on the ground.
- 5 June 2024: A PAF JF-17 Block 2 aircraft crashed during a routine training flight in Jhang District in the Punjab Province. The fighter jet reportedly belonged to No. 14 Squadron "Tail Choppers". The pilot successfully ejected. The crash was reported by the manufacturer of the ejection seat of the aircraft, Martin Baker.

== Specifications (JF-17 Block 3) ==
JF-17 Thunder 3-view drawing

JF-17B Dual-seat side-view drawing

Data from Pakistan Aeronautical Complex marketing brochure and official website

General characteristics

- Crew: 1 (single-seat JF-17), 2 (dual-seat JF-17B)
- Length: 14.33 m (47 ft 0 in)
- Wingspan: 9.44 m (31 ft 0 in)
- Height: 4.57 m (15 ft 0 in)
- Wing area: 24.43 m^{2} (263.0 sq ft)
- Empty weight: 7,965 kg (17,560 lb)
- Max takeoff weight: 13,500 kg (29,762 lb)
- Fuel capacity: Internal: 3,000 L (2,449 kg); External (3 drop tanks): 1 × 800 L (180 imp gal) under-belly drop tank; 2 × 800 L (180 imp gal) or 1,100 L (240 imp gal) under-wing drop tanks
- Powerplant: 1 × Klimov RD-93MA afterburning turbofan (91.2 kN (20,500 lbf) thrust with afterburner) with Full Authority Digital Engine Control (FADEC) (previous engine: 1 x Klimov RD-93 afterburning turbofan (84.4 kN (18,974 lbf) thrust with afterburner)

Performance

- Maximum speed: 1,910 km/h (1,190 mph, 1,030 kn)
- Maximum speed: Mach 1.8
- Stall speed: 150 km/h (93 mph, 81 kn)
- Combat range: 900 km (560 mi, 490 nmi) on internal fuel, 1,741 km (1,082 mi, 940 nmi) with drop tanks
- Ferry range: 1,800 km (1,100 mi, 970 nmi) on internal fuel, 3,482 km (2,163 mi, 1,880 nmi) with drop tanks
- Service ceiling: 16,916 m (55,500 ft)
- g limits: +8/-3 (limited by flight control system)
- Rate of climb: 300 m/s (59,000 ft/min)
- Thrust/weight: 1.07 with RD-93

Armament

- Guns: 1 × 23 mm GSh-23 twin-barrel cannon
- Hardpoints: 8 (2 × wingtip, 4 × under-wing, 1 × under-fuselage, 1 × chin) with capacity for dual ejector racks on each under-wing hardpoint

JF-17 Thunder weapon hardpoints

- Payload: 3,400 kg (7,500 lb)
- Missiles:
  - Air-to-air missiles:
    - PL-5EII — (Infrared Homing, Short Range Missile)
    - PL-10E — (Infrared Homing, short range missile)
    - PL-12AE (SD-10A) — (Radar Guided, Beyond Visual Range Missile)
    - PL-15/PL-15E — (Radar Guided, Beyond Visual Range Missile)
    - R-Darter — (Radar Homing, Beyond Visual Range Missile)
    - Faaz-1 (Active Radar Homing and Imaging Infrared)
    - Faaz-2 (Active Radar Homing and Imaging Infrared)
  - Air-to-surface missiles:
    - Taimoor — (Long range subsonic cruise missile)
    - CM-102 — (Anti-radiation missile)
    - LD-10 — (Anti-radiation missile)
    - MAR-1 — (Anti-radiation missile)
    - Ra'ad-II — (Subsonic land attack/anti-ship cruise missile)
    - CM-400AKG — (Supersonic long-range air-to-surface missile)
    - LD-8A Anti-radiation missile

  - Anti-ship missiles:
    - C-601 — (Anti-ship missile)
    - C-705KD — (Anti-ship missile)
    - C-802AK — (Anti-ship missile)
    - CM-400AKG — (Supersonic long-range anti-ship missile)
    - Taimoor — (Subsonic sea-skimming long-range anti-ship variant)
- Bombs:
  - Unguided bombs:
    - 250 kg — Pre-fragmented Bomb
    - Pk-82 — (General-Purpose Bomb)
    - Pk-83 — (General-Purpose Bomb)
    - PK-84 — (General-Purpose Bomb)
    - HAFR-1 — (Anti-runway Bomb)
    - HAFR-2 — (Anti-runway Bomb)
    - RPB-1 — (Anti-runway Bomb)
    - BLU-107 — (Anti-runway Bomb)
    - Mk 20 Rockeye II — (Cluster Bomb)
  - Guided bombs:
    - H-2 SOW — (Glide Bomb)
    - H-4 SOW — (Glide Bomb)
    - GBU-10 — (Laser-Guided Bomb)
    - GBU-12 — (Laser-Guided Bomb)
    - GBU-16 — (Laser-Guided Bomb)
    - LT PGB LT-2 — (Laser-Guided Bomb)
    - TG/GB PGB GB-500/GB1 — (Laser-Guided Bomb)
    - TG/GB PGB GB250A/GB3A — (Laser-Guided Bomb)
    - TG/GB PGB GB-6 — (Laser-Guided Bomb)
    - LS PGB LS-6/500 — (Glide Bomb)
    - YL PGB CS/BBF1 (YL-3) — (250 kg (550 lb) Thermobaric Bomb)
    - SCP-5 — (Bunker Buster Bomb)
    - AZB-81 LR — (Small Diameter Bomb)
    - Takbir — (Weapons Guidance & Range Extension Kit)
    - GIDS IREK — (Range Extension Kit)
    - AZB-Series REK — (Range Extension Kit)
    - Al Battaar — (Laser-Guidance Kit)

Avionics

- Radar: KLJ-7A Air-cooled Active electronically scanned array (AESA) Fire-control radar (FCR)
- Radar Warning Receiver (RWR): 1 × BM/KJ-8602A
- Missile Approach Warning System (MAWS): 4 × Guide Infrared S740 Airborne MAWS
- Identification Friend or Foe (IFF) System: JZ/YD 125 or Pehchan-14 IFF
- Data Bus: MIL-STD-1760
- Tactical Data Link: Link-17
- Others:
  - External Pods:
    - Aselsan ASELPOD — Advanced Targeting Pod (Electro-Optical Reconnaissance, Surveillance, and Targeting System)
    - WMD-7 — FLIR Day/Night Targeting Pod
    - Panjnad EW Pod — Indigenous DRFM airborne self-protection and escort jamming pod developed by NASTP to replace foreign electronic attack suites.
  - Countermeasures:
    - Chaff/Flare dispensers
    - Indra Systems ALQ-500P — ESM/ECM Pod
  - Countermeasures: Chaff/Flare dispensers
  - ACMI: SDT ACMI System
  - Ejection Seat: Martin-Baker PK16LE zero-zero ejection seat
  - External Fuel Tanks: Up to 3 external drop tanks for extended range/loitering time:
    - 1 × 800 L (180 imp gal) under-belly drop tank
    - 2 × 800 L (180 imp gal) or 1,100 L (240 imp gal) under-wing drop tanks

== In popular culture ==
The JF-17 Thunder has been heavily featured in the 2019 Pakistani war action film Sherdil. Serving as the primary fighter for the protagonist, Flight Lieutenant Haris Mustafa, the indigenously built jet takes center stage. The movie’s high-stakes aerial combat sequences prominently showcase the multi-role fighter against Indian aircraft, highlighting its critical role in Pakistan’s modern defense capabilities.

The JF-17 has earned the nickname ‘Jeff ’ among the DCS World and other combat flight sim communities, the moniker is a playful phonetic anglicization derived directly from saying "JF" out loud.

== See also ==
Related development

- Project Sabre II
- Guizhou JL-9

Related lists

- List of active Pakistan Air Force aircraft
- List of Chinese aircraft
- List of fighter aircraft
