= KLJ-7 =

Type of aircraft fire-control radar

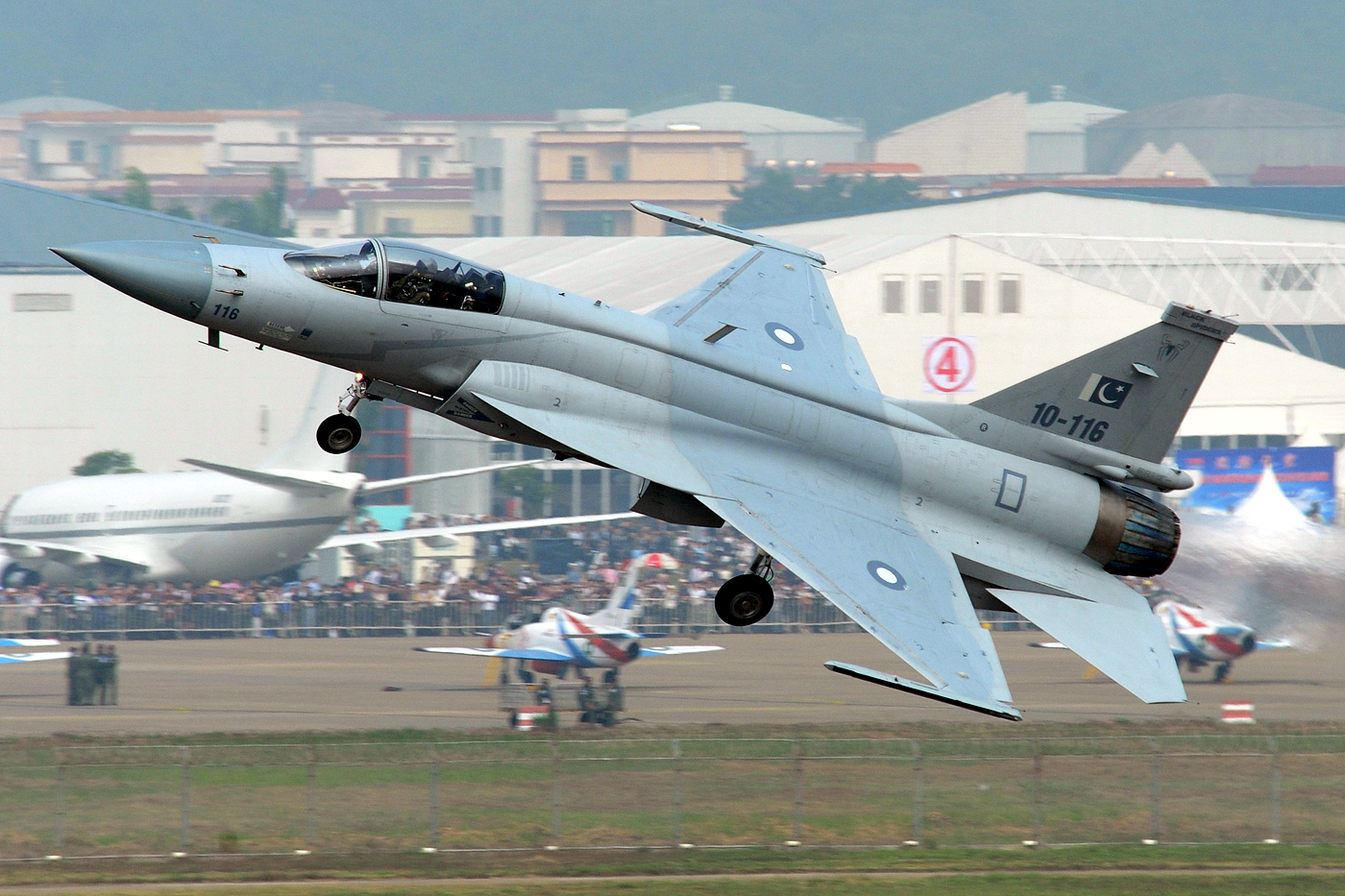
- Pakistan airforce JF-17 Thunder
- Country of origin: China
- Manufacturer: Nanjing Research Institute of Electronic Technology; Pakistan Aeronautical Complex (PAC)
- Introduced: Mid-2000s
- Type: Airborne, multi-mode, pulse-doppler, fire-control radar ( V-1) or active electronically scanned array radar ( V-2)
- Frequency: X band
- Range: In look up mode 150 km for 5m^{2} RCS (V1); In look down mode 100 km for 5m^{2} RCS (V1) 120 km for KLJ-7A.

The KLJ-7, also referred to as the Type 1478, is an X band airborne fire-control radar (FCR) developed by Nanjing Research Institute of Electronics Technology (NRIET), also known as the China Electronics Technology Company's (CETC's) No. 14 Research Institute. In December 2010, the Pakistan Air Force's Air Chief Marshal Rao Qamar Suleman announced that the KLJ-7 radar will be produced at the Pakistan Aeronautical Complex (PAC) in Kamra.

== Development and design ==
The KLJ-7 uses a mechanically steered planar array antenna and bears similarities with the various Russian radars imported in the 1990s. Russian radar design houses Phazotron and NIIP had worked closely in the past with the Chinese radar design bureaus and provided technical assistance as well as operational models of Russian-made radar sets that were used as benchmarks in the process of these Chinese firms developing their own design. Up to 20 units of the Phazotron Zhemchoug ('Pearl) radar were imported in the mid-1990s for evaluation along with 2 units of Phazotron (NIIR) RP-35,

The KLJ-7V1 has multiple modes, both beyond visual range (BVR) and close-in air-to-air modes, ground surveillance modes and anti-jamming capability. The radar can reportedly manage up to 40 targets, monitor up to 10 of them in track-while-scan (TWS) mode and simultaneously fire on two BVR targets. The detection range for targets with a radar cross-section of 3 square meters is stated to be ≥75 km (≥35 km in look-down mode). Surface sea targets can be detected at up to 135 km. Most modern Chinese air-launched weapons, such as the short-range PL-9C and the beyond-visual-range PL-12 (SD-10) air-to-air missiles are supported by the KLJ-7. It has been reported that KLJ-7 also has modes to support a range of NATO weaponry.

According to a Pakistan Aeronautical Complex programme officer, after having "flown with this radar" as well as "other models... such as the Thales RC400" and evaluating them for the JF-17 lightweight fighter, the Chinese radar is "every bit as capable as its contemporary analogues."

A more powerful model, called the KLJ-7V2, has been produced.

=== Radar modes ===
Data from: Janes Defence

- Range While Search (RWS)
- Velocity Search (VS)
- Single Target Track (STT)
- Track While Scan (TWS)
- Dual Target Track (DTT)
- Situational Awareness Mode (SAM)
- Air Combat Mode (ACM)(with five sub-modes)
- Real Beam Map (RBM)
- Doppler Beam Sharpening (DBS)
- Ground Moving Target Indication/Ground Moving Target Track (GMTI/GMTT)
- Air to Ground Ranging (AGR)
- Synthetic Aperture Radar (SAR)
- Sea Single Target Track (SSTT)
- Beacon (BCN)

== Specifications ==
Data from: JF-17 official website

- Frequency: X band
- Range:
  - Look-up: >105 km (for RCS of 5m^{2}) (V1) or 200 km (for RCS of 5 m^{2}) (V2),
  - Look-down: >85 km (for RCS of 5m^{2}) (V1) or V2
- Total targets tracked: 10 in TWS (Track-While-Scan) mode (V1)
- Reliability:
  - MTBF (Mean Time Between Failure): 220 hours
  - MTTR (Mean Time To Recovery): 0.5 hours
- Weight: ≤120 kg
- Volume: 0.065 m^{3}

== See also ==
- FC-1 Xiaolong / JF-17 Thunder
- List of radars
