= CM-400 =

Chinese supersonic anti-ship/radiation missile

CM-400 / CM-400AKG
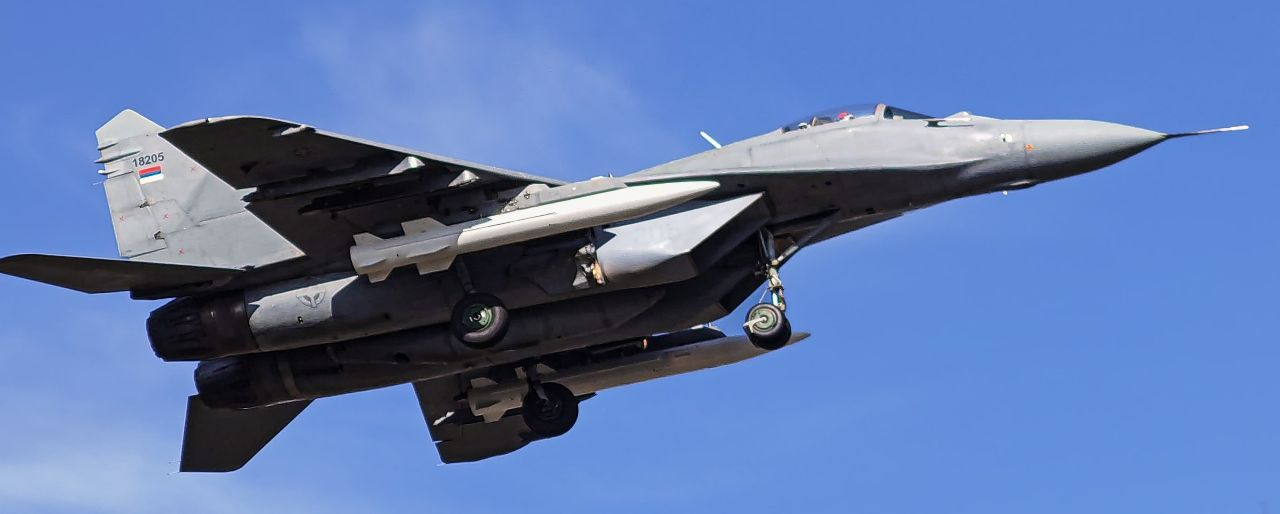
- MIG-29 of Serbian Air Force and Air Defence carrying CM-400 anti-ship missile
- Type: CM-400: Air-to-surface anti-ship missile; CM-400AKG: Air-to-surface anti-radiation missile
- Place of origin: China

Service history
- In service: 2012–present
- Used by: See § Operators

Production history
- Manufacturer: China Aerospace Science and Industry Corporation (CASIC)

Specifications
- Mass: 910 kg (2,010 lb)
- Length: 510 cm (16.7 ft)
- Diameter: 400 mm (16 in)
- Warhead: 150–200 kg (330–440 lb) warhead
- Engine: Solid-fuel rocket motor
- Operational range: 400 km (250 mi; 220 nmi)
- Maximum speed: Mach 3 to 5
- Guidance system: INS - GNSS + IR/TV Seeker
- Launch platform: Air-launched

The CM-400 is a family of Chinese supersonic air-launched missiles that includes anti-ship missile and anti-radiation missile variants manufactured by China Aerospace Science and Industry Corporation (CASIC).

== Development and history ==
The CM-400AKG was unveiled at the 2012 China International Aviation & Aerospace Exhibition, where it was claimed to have entered service on Pakistan Air Force CAC/PAC JF-17 Thunders. At the 2013 Dubai Airshow, a Pakistani military source claimed the missile was in Chinese service, and that an anti-ship version was in development. In 2014, a PAF JF-17 was spotted carrying two – possibly mock-up – CM-400AKGs, suggesting the missile was still in development.

At the 2013 Paris Air Show, Fábrica Argentina de Aviones officials revealed the missile's performance was a major reason for their interest in co-producing the JF-17.

== Design ==
The CM-400AKG supersonic anti-ship missile is a derivative of the SY-400 guided rocket, also developed by the China Aerospace Science and Industry Corporation (CASIC).

The CM-400AKG is advertised as having a 510 cm (16.7 ft) length, a 400 mm (16 in) diameter, a mass of 910 kg (2,010 lb), and a range of 100–240 km (62–149 mi; 54–130 nmi), and capable of carrying either a 150 kg (330 lb) blast warhead or a 200 kg (440 lb) penetrator warhead. It has a high cruise altitude and a steep terminal dive with a maximum terminal speed of Mach 4.5 to Mach 5. Seeker options include "INS + GNSS + Passive Radar Seeker," potentially for anti-ship with a circular error probable (CEP) of 5 m (16 ft)., and "INS-GNSS+IR/TV Seeker", with a CEP of 5–10 m (16–33 ft). Pakistan air force officials described the missile as "an aircraft carrier killer."

According to Pakistan, the CM-400AKG has a 400 km (250 mi) range, a speed of Mach 5, and uses passive homing.

== Operational history ==
=== Pakistan ===
The Pakistan Air Force (PAF) reportedly purchased 60 CM-400AKG missiles from China in 2017 and 2018. They are integrated onto the CAC/PAC JF-17 Thunder.

The CM-400AKG first combat use was during the 2025 India–Pakistan conflict. On May 10, JF-17s performing a SEAD mission fired CM-400AKGs against an Indian S-400 surface-to-air missile (SAM) battery at Adampur Air Force Station. According to Pakistan, the missiles destroyed the battery's radars which effectively suppressed the battery. On May 13, India denied any damage to Adampur; government media from after the attack showed a transporter erector launcher but no radar. Low-resolution satellite imagery of the suspected battery location showed burn marks and "localised ground disturbance", suggesting damage to battery equipment; the images may have been altered to show damage. Furthermore, one thing is certain that without on-site photographs, authenticated radar recordings, and parametric analysis, what truly occurred between these two systems remains, for the time being, a matter of speculation and personal interpretation.

=== Serbia ===
Serbia bought the missiles by March 2026. They were integrated onto Serbian Air Force and Air Defence Mikoyan MiG-29s. Favorable reports of the missile's performance during the 2025 India–Pakistan conflict were a factor in the purchase.

== Operators ==
Pakistan

- Pakistan Air Force (PAF): CM-400AKG

Serbia

- Serbian Air Force and Air Defence (SAFAD)
