= World Defense Show =

Defense technology sales exhibition

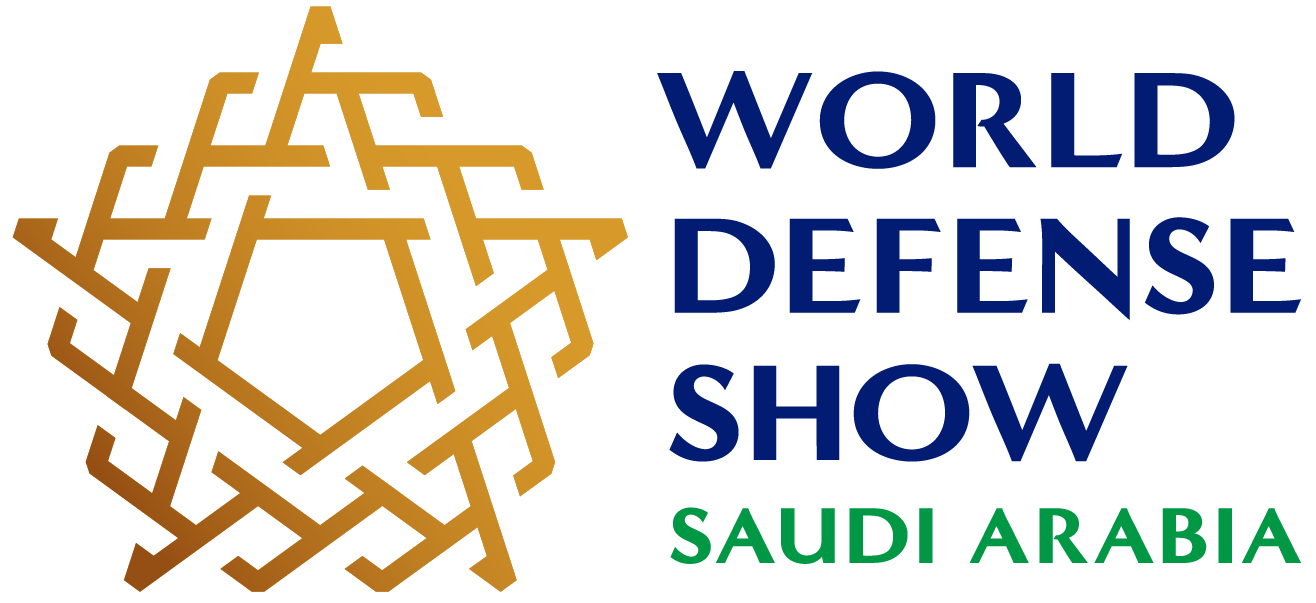
- World Defense Show logo
- Genre: Defense
- Dates: February 8–12, 2026
- Frequency: Biennial: Odd years
- Venue: Riyadh Exhibition and Convention Centre
- Location: Riyadh
- Country: Saudi Arabia
- Inaugurated: 2022; 4 years ago
- Most recent: 2026
- Next event: 2028
- Attendance: 137,000 in 2026
- Organizer: Saudi Arabia's General Authority for Military Industries (GAMI)
- Website: https://www.worlddefenseshow.com/

The World Defense Show (WDS) is a biennial defense event founded by Saudi Arabia's General Authority for Military Industries (GAMI). Held in Riyadh, it showcases cutting-edge, multi-domain technologies, acting as a global hub for networking, live demonstrations, and industry, government, and military collaboration. It is the only global defense exhibition structured around five fully integrated domains: air, land, sea, space, and security.

== World Defense Show 2026 ==
The third edition of the World Defense Show in Riyadh secured 60 military and defense deals worth a combined SAR 33 billion (approx. $8.8B USD), according to Ahmed Al-Ohali, Governor of GAMI and chairman of the show's supervisory committee.

The five-day show drew a record 1,486 exhibitors from 89 countries, alongside 513 official delegations from 121 countries, and attracted 137,000 visitors. Aerial and static displays included 63 aircraft, alongside more than 700 pieces of military equipment exhibited across indoor and outdoor platforms. Maritime and unmanned systems were also showcased through dedicated demonstration areas. Also at the show, 355 live air shows were made, and 70 sessions were held across three main theaters featuring 151 speakers.

GAMI has begun preparations for World Defense Show 2028, aiming to build on 2026 gains and support the objectives of Saudi Vision 2030 while strengthening the Kingdom's position in the global defense industry.

Due to tensions at the time, several Emirati companies bowed out of participating in 2026.
