= PL-12 =

Chinese medium-range, active radar homing air-to-air BVR missile

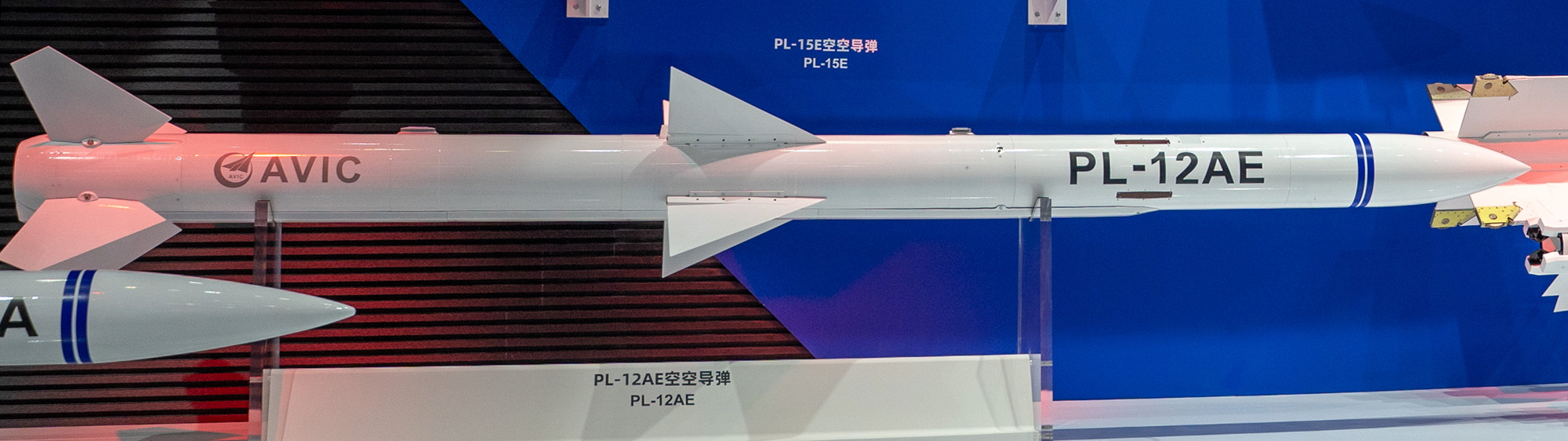
- PL-12AE mockup at Zhuhai Airshow 2024
- Type: Medium-range, active radar homing air-to-air BVR missile
- Place of origin: People's Republic of China

Service history
- In service: 2005-present
- Used by: People's Liberation Army Air Force People's Liberation Army Naval Air Force; Pakistan Air Force Myanmar Air Force

Specifications
- Mass: 180 kilograms (400 lb)
- Engine: Dual thrust solid fuel rocket
- Operational range: 70–100 kilometres (43–62 mi)
- Maximum speed: Mach 4+
- Guidance system: Active radar homing
- Launch platform: Aircraft

The PL-12 (Chinese: 霹雳-12; pinyin: Pī Lì-12; lit. 'Thunderbolt-12', NATO reporting name: CH-AA-7 Adze) is an active radar-guided beyond-visual-range air-to-air missile developed by the People's Republic of China. It is considered comparable to the US AIM-120 AMRAAM and the Russian R-77. The missile is succeeded by the PL-15 missile.

== History ==
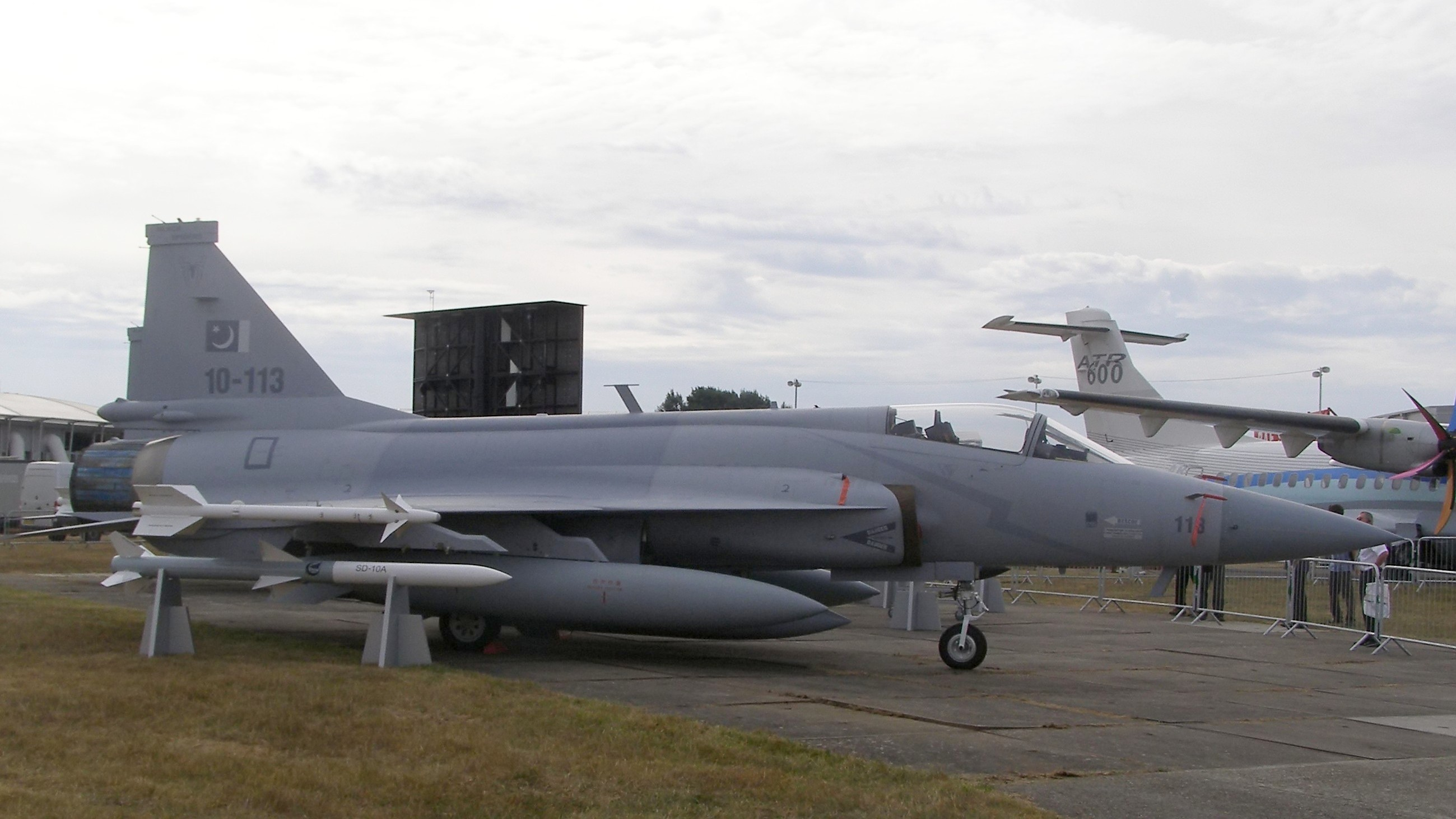
A model of an export version of the PL-12, SD-10A, (bottom-left corner) with a Pakistan Air Force JF-17 on display at the Farnborough Airshow 2010.

Development of the PL-12 (SD-10) began in 1997. The first public information on the PL-12 – then called the SD-10 – emerged in 2001. Development was assisted by Vympel NPO and Agat of Russia. Liang Xiaogeng is believed to have been the chief designer. Four successful test firings were made in 2004. The missile entered People's Liberation Army Air Force (PLAAF) service in 2005.

== Design ==
The early batches of PL-12 missiles reportedly used the 9B-1348 radar seeker designed for the R-77 missile. The development process was assisted by Vympel NPO and Tactical Missile Corporation and benefited from Russian technology transfers. But as of 2018, the PL-12 was no longer reliant on Russian components for missile production.

The guidance system comprises data-linked mid-course guidance and active radar homing for terminal guidance. The missile uses a Chinese rocket motor and airframe. The PL-12 may have a passive homing mode for use against jammers and AEW aircraft. The maximum range is estimated to be 100 kilometres (62 mi).

PL-12's overall dimension is larger than the American AIM-120 AMRAAM. Per PLAAF assessment, PL-12's capability sits between AIM-120B and AIM-120C, and the improved PL-12A is claimed to be comparable with the AIM-120C-4. The domestic version of the PL-12 features a variable-thrust rocket motor with a range of 70–100 kilometres (43–62 mi), while the export variant SD-10 features a reduced range of 60–70 kilometres (37–43 mi). According to the Royal United Services Institute, the range performance of PL-12 stands between AIM-120B and AIM-120C-5.

== Variants ==
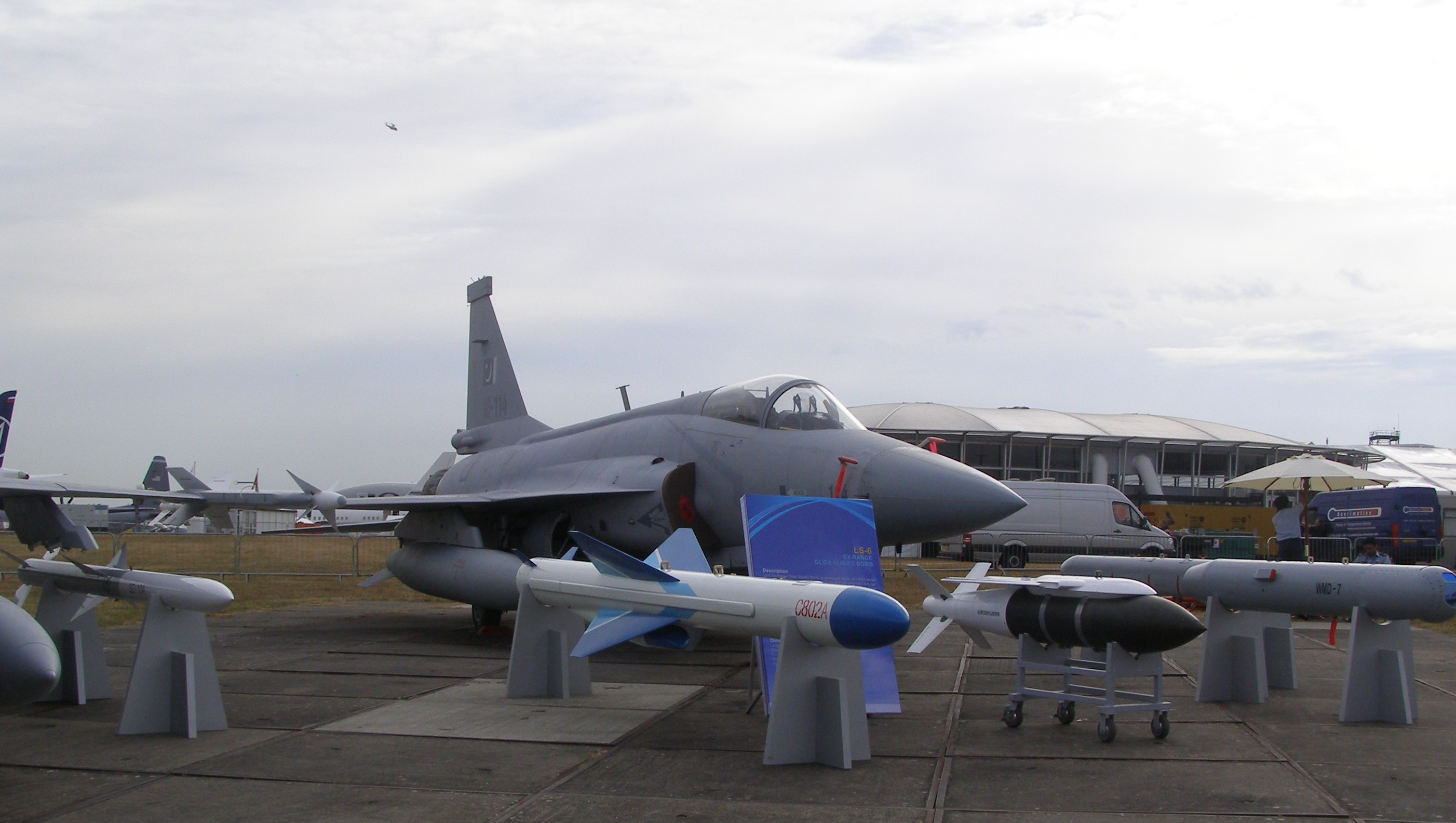
SD-10A on display with the JF-17 light-weight fighter at the Farnborough International Airshow 2010.

PL-12
Domestic version with 60 to 100 km range.
PL-12A
NATO reporting name is CH-AA-7A. Improved PL-12 with a modified seeker and digital processor. Reportedly fitted with passive mode for anti-radiation missions.
PL-12C
Variant with folded control fins, designed to fit inside the J-20 weapons bay. Missile did not enter service and used to develop the PL-15.
PL-12D
Variant powered by a China Aerospace Science and Technology Corporation ramjet. Missile did not enter service and used to develop the PL-15.
SD-10A (ShanDian-10A, 闪电-10A)
Export version of the PL-12 with a reduced maximum launch range of 37–44 miles (60–71 km).
SD-10B
Enhanced SD-10A with better anti-jamming capability.
LD-10
Anti-radiation missile based on SD-10.

== Operators ==
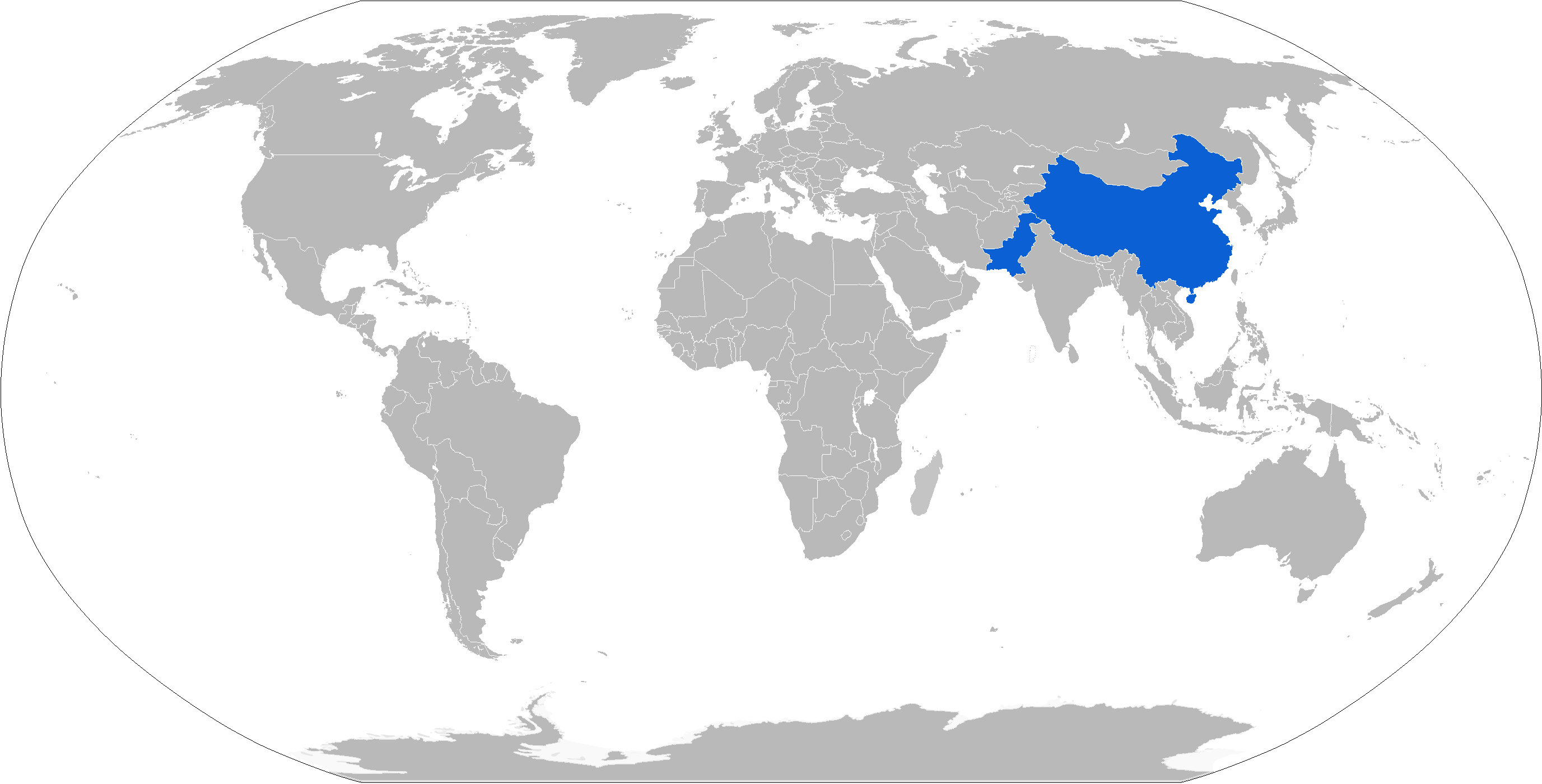
Map with PL-12 operators in blue

=== Current operators ===
China

- People's Liberation Army Air Force
- People's Liberation Army Naval Air Force

Pakistan

- Pakistan Air Force (PAF) - 575 delivered of 750 ordered as of 2021

Myanmar

- Myanmar Air Force - 24 delivered of 60 ordered as of 2021

== See also ==
- AAM-4 – (Japan)
- AIM-120 AMRAAM – (United States)
- R-77 – (Russia)
- TC-2 – (Taiwan)
