= Song Wencong =

Chinese aircraft designer

- 宋文骢
- Born: 26 March 1930; Kunming, Yunnan, China
- Died: 22 March 2016 (aged 85); Beijing, China
- Education: Harbin Institute of Military Engineering
- Known for: developing the single seat version of the Chengdu J-10
- Scientific career
- Fields: Aircraft design
- Workplaces: China Aviation Industry Corporation I (AVIC-1)

Chinese name
- Traditional Chinese: 宋文驄
- Simplified Chinese: 宋文骢
Transcriptions
Standard Mandarin
- Hanyu Pinyin: Sòng Wéncōng
- Wade–Giles: Sung Wen-ts'ung

Song Wencong (Chinese: 宋文骢; 26 March 1930 – 22 March 2016) was a Chinese aerospace engineer and aircraft designer, who was responsible for the development of the single seat version of the Chengdu J-10. He was a member of the Chinese Academy of Engineering.

== Biography ==
Song was born on 26 March 1930, in Kunming, Yunnan, with his ancestral home in Dali, Yunnan. He joined a youth organization of the Chinese Communist Party by the end of 1948. He enlisted in the Yunnan-Guangxi-Guizhou border region column of People's Liberation Army in July 1949 as a scout. In May 1951, he joined the China's People's Volunteer Army to fight against the United Nations Command in the Korean War. In August 1954, he was accepted to Harbin Institute of Military Engineering (now Harbin Engineering University), where he majored in aircraft engine at the Air Force Engineering Department. After graduating in July 1960 he was assigned to Shenyang 601 Design District as a designer. He was a designer of Chengdu 611 Design District from 1970 to 1974, and he was elected deputy chief designer for 1977 and chief designer for 1980.

At the age of 56, he was appointed chief designer of the Chengdu J-10.

In 2003, he was elected a member of the Chinese Academy of Engineering.

He was honored as one of the top ten people touching China in 2009.

On 22 March 2016, Song died at 301 Military Hospital in Beijing, aged 85.

== See also ==
- Chengdu Aircraft Industry Corporation
- Chengdu Aircraft Design Institute
- Yang Wei
