= Yang Wei (aircraft designer) =

Chinese aircraft designer (born 1963)

Yang Wei (Chinese: 杨伟; born May 1963) is a Chinese aerospace engineer and aircraft designer. He is a vice president of the China Association for Science and Technology (中国科学技术协会) and a member of the Chinese Academy of Sciences (中国科学院), class of 2017. He is also a member of the Chinese Communist Party.

== Biography ==
Yang was born in Beijing in 1963 with ancestral roots in Zizhong County, Neijiang, Sichuan province.

== Education and early career ==
Yang was the youngest general designer China ever had, completing his undergraduate education by the age of 19, and graduate education by the age of 22 from the Northwestern Polytechnical University. Yang first joined the Chengdu Aircraft Design Institute in the late 1980s, and in late 2001, at the age of 38, he was promoted to the highest rank within the institute as its director.

== Career ==
Since 1998, Yang has become the general designer of numerous aircraft, and he is also one of the founders of fully digitized fly-by-wire control systems in China, a feat that greatly helped him become general designer of aircraft. Under his leadership, it took less than four years to achieve a maiden flight from scratch for FC-1, a record that remains unbroken in China today, and this was achieved while Yang was also the general designer of the Chengdu J-10 double seated version. Although only being the general designer of the twin seater version of the Chengdu J-10, Yang was the chief engineer of the digital fly-by-wire control systems for both the single seater and the twin seater version of the Chengdu J-10. Due to the nature of his work, Yang's achievements were kept secret and it wasn't until January 2007 that Chengdu J-10 began to appear in a very limited fashion on official Chinese governmental websites, such as the Xinhua News Agency.

In 2026 his name and biography was removed from the official online roster of the Chinese Academy of Sciences as part of an anti-corruption crackdown on the Chinese military industrial complex.

== Awards ==
Recipient of Pakistan's high civilian honour Sitara-e-Imtiaz in 2017 for his services to design JF-17 Aircraft.
