= KD-88 =

Chinese air-to-surface missile

KD-88 / KD-88A
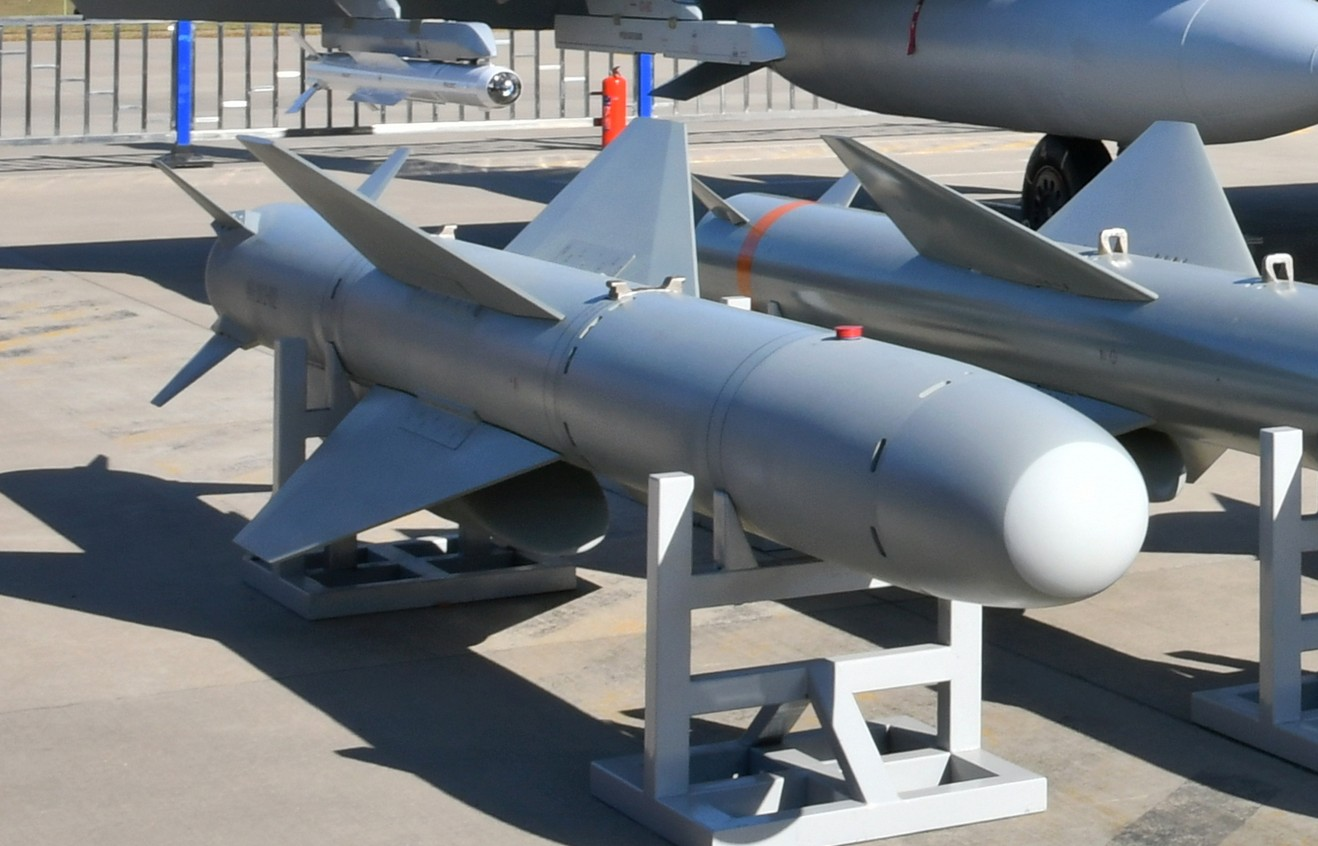
- KD-88A is the imaging infrared guided version of the KD-88
- Type: Medium-range air-to-surface missile
- Place of origin: China

Service history
- In service: 2006
- Used by: China

Production history
- Manufacturer: Hongdu Aviation Industry Corporation

Specifications
- Mass: 600 kg (1,300 lb)
- Length: 470 cm (15.4 ft)
- Diameter: 36.02 cm (14.18 in)
- Warhead: 165 kg (364 lb) warhead
- Engine: turbojet
- Propellant: liquid fuel
- Operational range: 200 km (120 mi; 110 nmi)
- Maximum speed: Mach 0.85
- Guidance system: CCD/TV-seeker for KD-88 or imaging infrared (IIR) for KD-88A
- Launch platform: JH-7A; J-10C; J-16; J-15

The KD-88 (Kongdi-88; Chinese: 空地-88) is a standoff land attack missile built by Hongdu Aviation Industry Corporation and exported by China National Aero-Technology Import & Export Corporation (CATIC). Its export version is called TL-7 and TL-17.

== Description ==
KD-88 is derived from YJ-83 missile. KD-88 uses the body of YJ-83 but replaces the seeker with CCD/TV-seeker. The export version is called TL-7 (Chinese: 天龙-7; lit. 'Sky Dragon-7'). The KD-88A variant uses an imaging infrared (IIR) seeker for terminal inferred homing. TL-17 is the IIR variant made for export.

It can be launched from a fighter aircraft or a bomber. It features a turbojet engine with cruising speeds of Mach 0.8 to Mach 0.85, and a range of 200 kilometres (120 mi). Although comparable in size, configuration, and capabilities, the KD-88 is not a true member of the YJ-8 family.

The KD-88 can be found on the Shenyang J-11 and Shenyang J-15 multi-role aircraft.

The KD-88 is designated AKD-88 (K/AKD88) in the PLAAF service.

== Variants ==
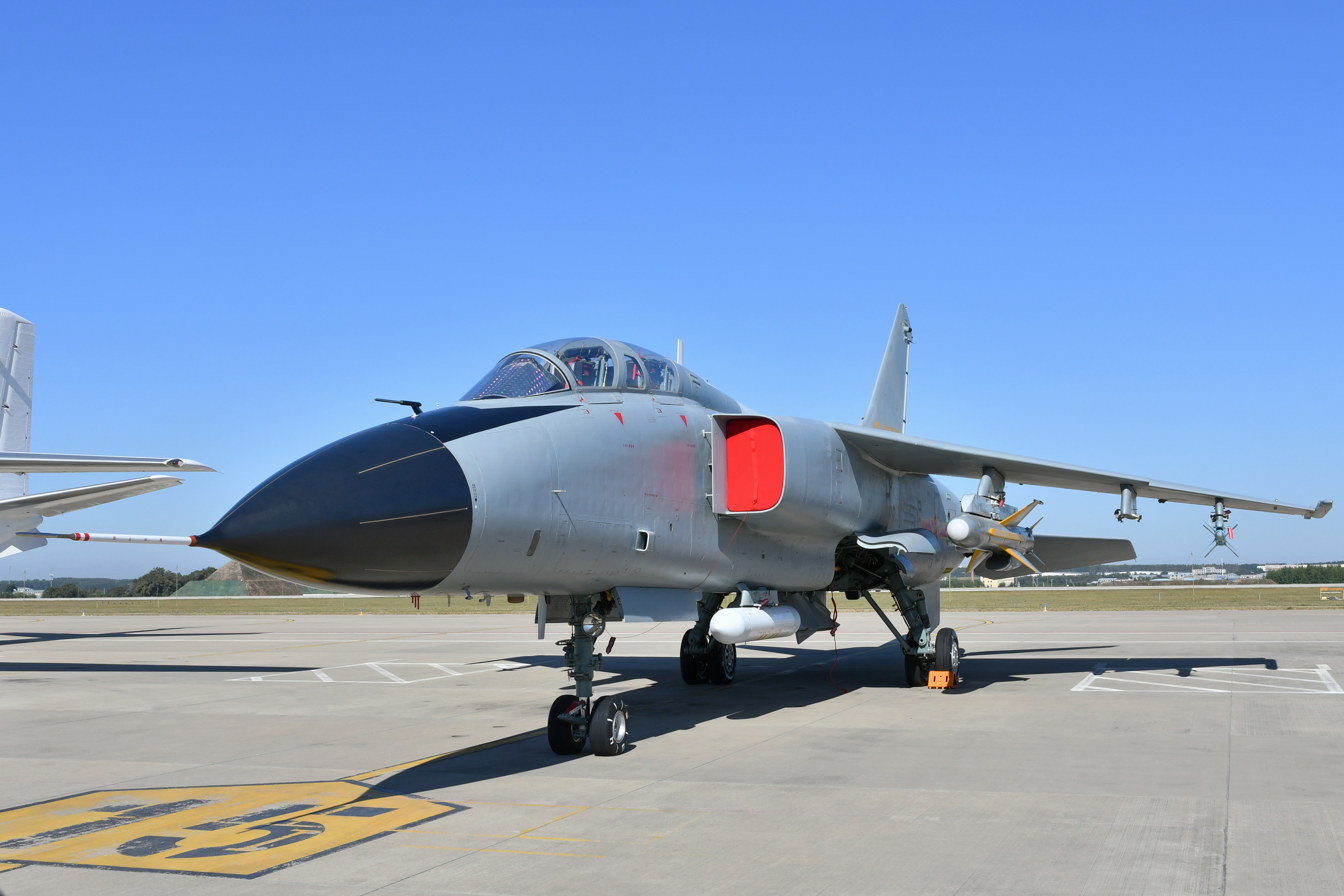
A KD-88A being carried by JH-7 fighter-bomber

KD-88
TV/CCD variant.
TL-7
TV/CCD variant for export.
KD-88A
Imaging infrared version.
TL-17
Imaging infrared version for export.
CM-802AKG
Export version of KD-88. Based on the air-launched YJ-83 with a television (TV) or imaging-infrared (IIR) seeker, redesigned airframe with more fuel, data-link, and 220 km (140 mi; 120 nmi) of range.
AKF088C
Ranged extended version with two folded low wings. Unveiled at Zhuhai Airshow 2022.

== Operators ==
China

- People's Liberation Army Air Force
- People's Liberation Army Naval Air Force

== See also ==
- AGM-84E
- AGM-84H/K SLAM-ER
- Kh-59
