= Yu Xu =

Chinese fighter pilot

- 余旭
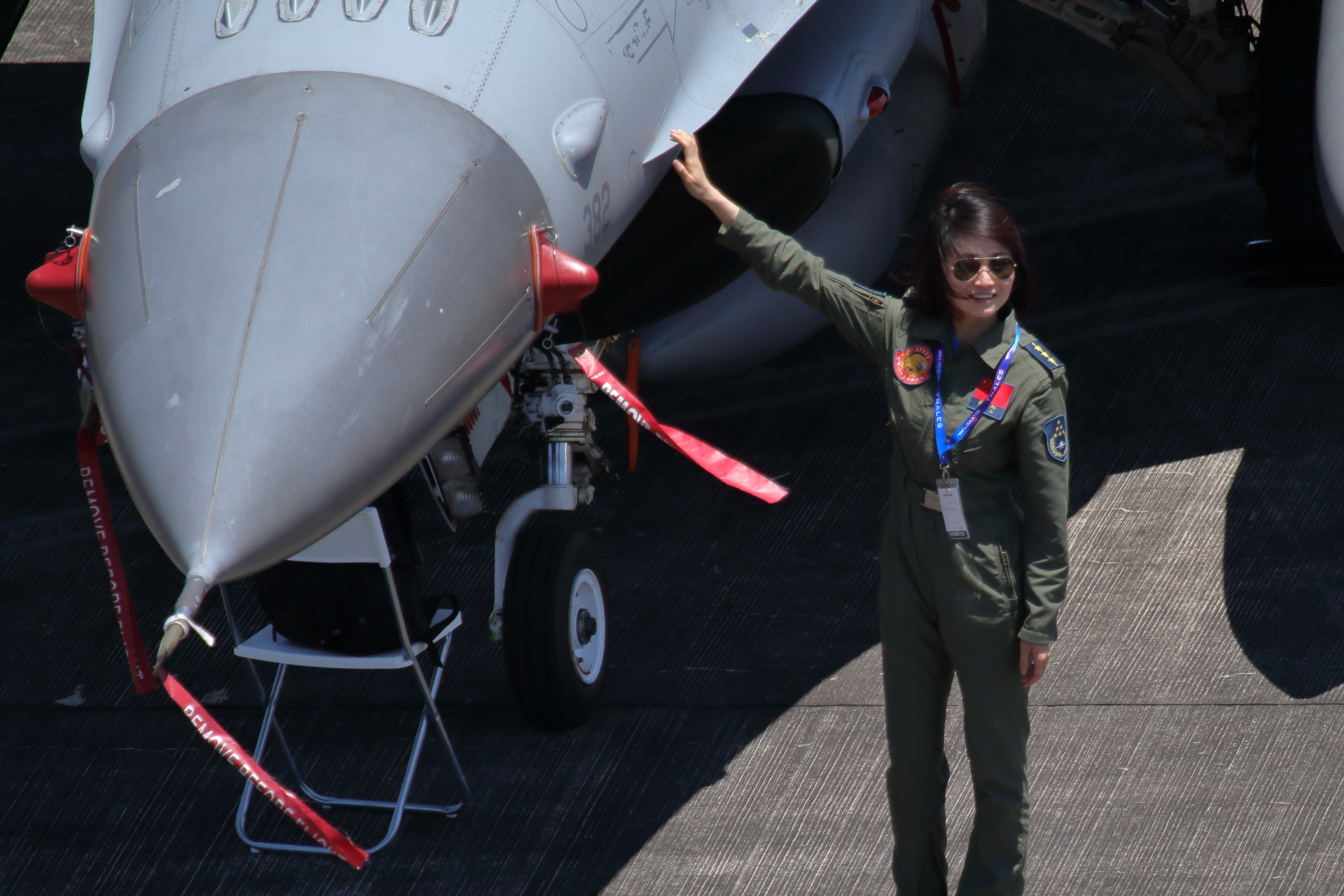
- Yu with a U.S. Air Force F-16C at Langkawi, Malaysia.
- Born: March 1986; Chongqing County, Sichuan, China (present day Chongzhou, Sichuan, China)
- Died: 12 November 2016 (aged 30); Yutian County, Hebei, China
- Occupation: Military pilot

Yu Xu (Chinese: 余旭; March 1986 – November 12, 2016) was a Chinese female fighter pilot who served as a flight squadron leader in the August 1st aerobatic team of the People's Liberation Army Air Force.

== Early life ==
Yu was born in Chengdu, the capital of the southwestern Chinese province Sichuan.

== Education ==
Yu entered the military as a student at the PLA Air Force Aviation University in 2005, and graduated in 2009. Sixteen women (including Yu) had graduated that year, which made her among the first women certified to fly fighter jets.

== Career ==
Yu joined the People's Liberation Army Air Force in September 2005. Yu appeared with the other female pilots at the 2010 CCTV New Year's Gala. In 2012, she was certified to fly the Chengdu J-10, single-engine jet. Yu's fans referred to her with the nickname, "Golden Peafowl."

== Death ==
Yu died during an aerobatic training session on November 12, 2016, after being struck by another plane as she ejected from the J-10. However, some reports stated she was unable to eject on time from her plane before it made impact with the ground.
