= August 1st (aerobatic team) =

August 1st Aerobatic Team
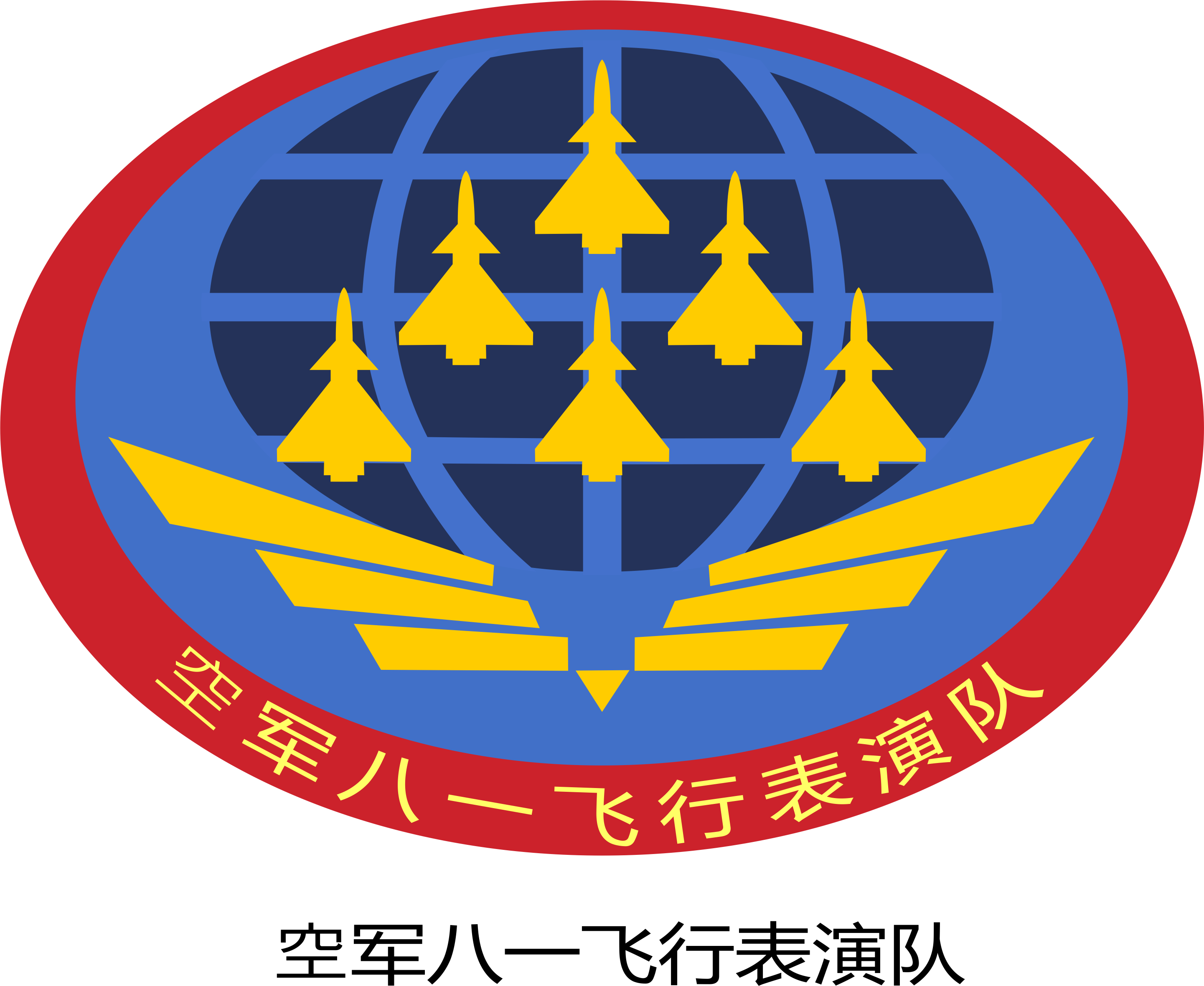
- August 1st aerobatic team logo
- Active: 1962 – present
- Country: China
- Branch: People's Liberation Army Air Force
- Role: Aerobatic Display
- Garrison/HQ: Yangcun Air Base
- Nickname: Bayi
- Colors: White and Red; formerly White and Blue (with red star on the tail fin)

Aircraft flown
- Fighter: 8 Chengdu J-10

The August 1st or Ba Yi Aerobatics Team (Chinese: 八一飞行表演队) is the aerobatic demonstration team of the People's Liberation Army Air Force (PLAAF). It was founded in 1962 and named after the date of founding of the People's Liberation Army (PLA), August 1, 1927.

== History ==
It is named after the date of the founding of the PLA (August 1, 1927), and is a part of the PLAAF Beijing Military Region. The unit was founded in 1962 and has over the years performed more than 500 times for delegations from 166 countries and regions. Its first show abroad happened in August 2013 during the Russian airshow MAKS.

== Aircraft ==
The August 1st aerobatic team (Ba Yi aerobatic team) initially equipped the fleet with JJ-5 fighter-trainer jets, a Chinese version of Russian made MiG-17. In later years the JJ-5s were replaced by Chengdu J-7EB, then again was replaced by the newer J-7GB (2001). There are about 8 aircraft in the fleet, but only 6 are set for any airshow.

In May 2009, the team upgraded their jets to the much more advanced Chengdu J-10A multirole fighter. In 2023 it reequipped with the C-Version of the Chengdu J-10, first appearing at the Langkawi International Maritime and Aerospace Exhibition (LIMA) event in Malaysia.

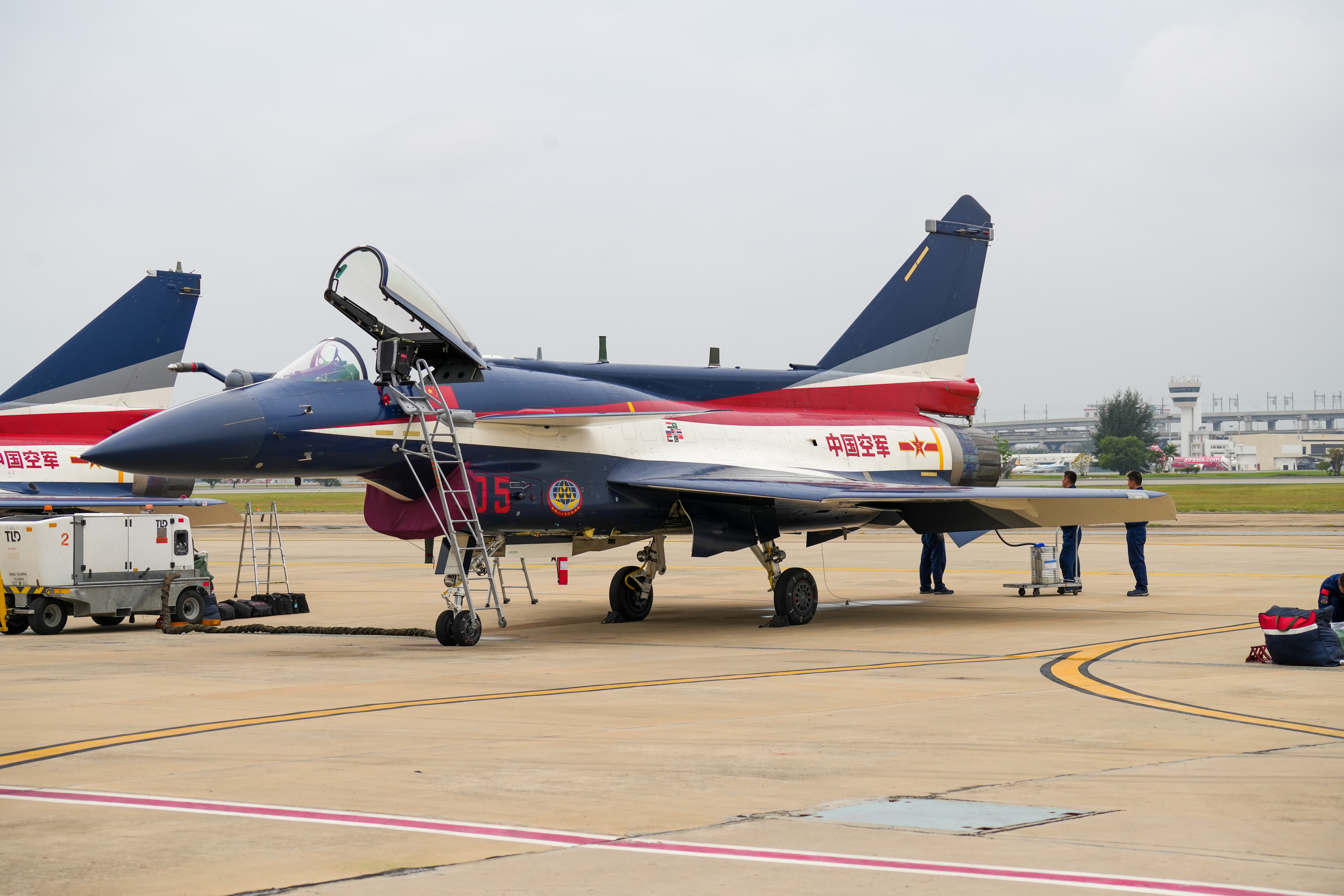
Chengdu J-10 August 1st aerobatic team at Don Mueang Airport 2025

== Base ==
- The aerobatics team is based out of Yangcun Air Force Base (Meichong) near Tianjin, home to the 24th Fighter Division.

== Appearances ==
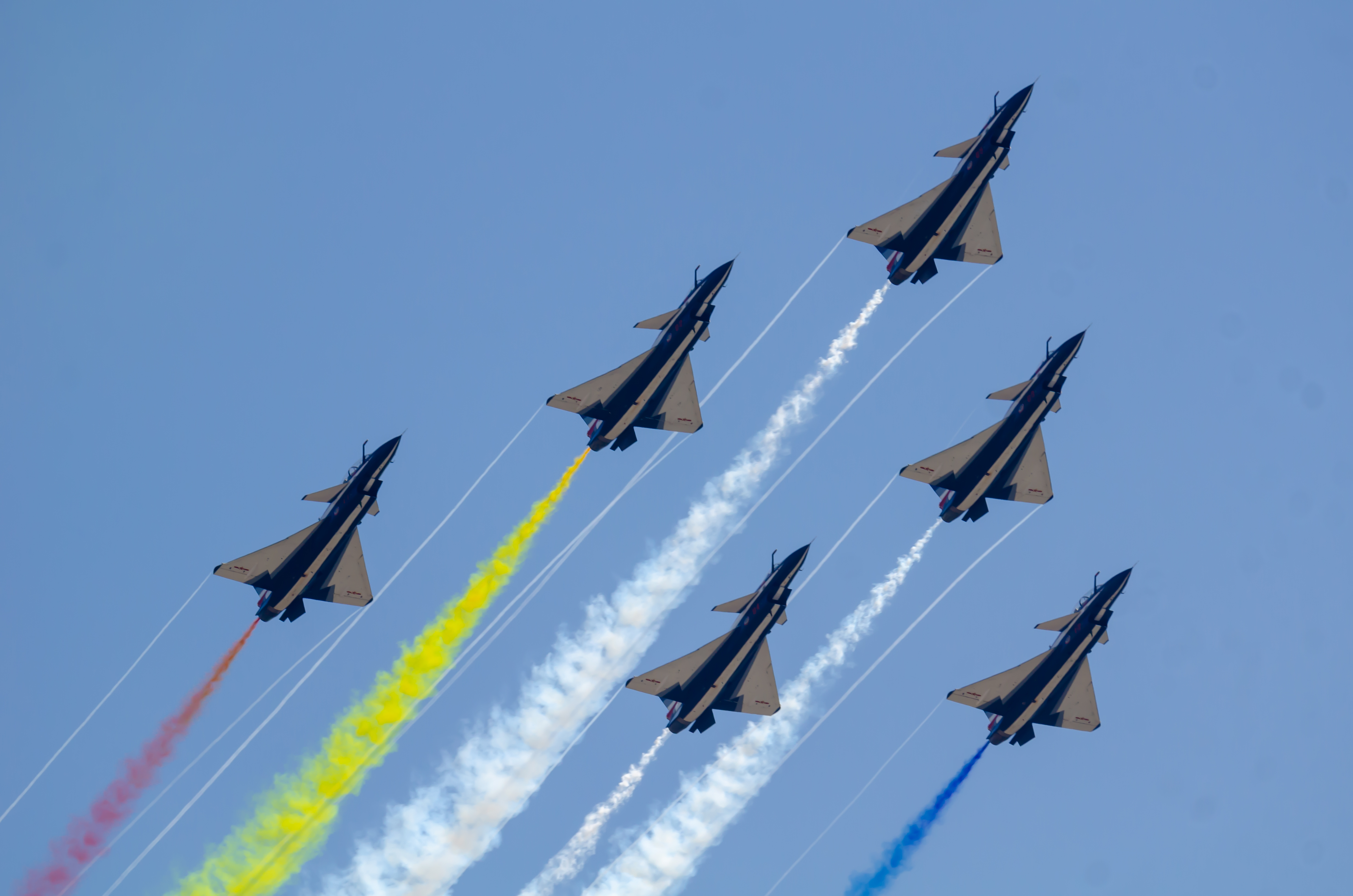
August 1st Chengdu J-10's in formation

- China International Aviation & Aerospace Exhibition
- MAKS 2013
- Joint Pakistan Air Force and PLAAF Airshow at PAF Base Samungli in 2017
- 2019 Pakistan Day Parade
- Singapore Airshow 2020
- 2015 and 2023 edition of the Langkawi International Maritime and Aerospace Exhibition
- 2025 the 88th anniversary of the Royal Thai Air Force (RTAF)
- Singapore Airshow 2026

== Accidents ==
- June 1997 – 3 aircraft crashed in Tianjin during a practice session.
- 15 September 1998 – single aircraft crashed near Chongming Island Airport near Shanghai.
- July 14, 2009 – Number 3 wing, which was a J-7GB, crashed at Yang Cun airbase during practicing session, while preparing for the coming National Day demonstration on October 1.
- 12 November 2016 – Captain Yu Xu, first female J-10 pilot, was killed in an accident during training in Hebei province.
