= List of international trips made by Muhammad Yunus as Chief Adviser of Bangladesh =

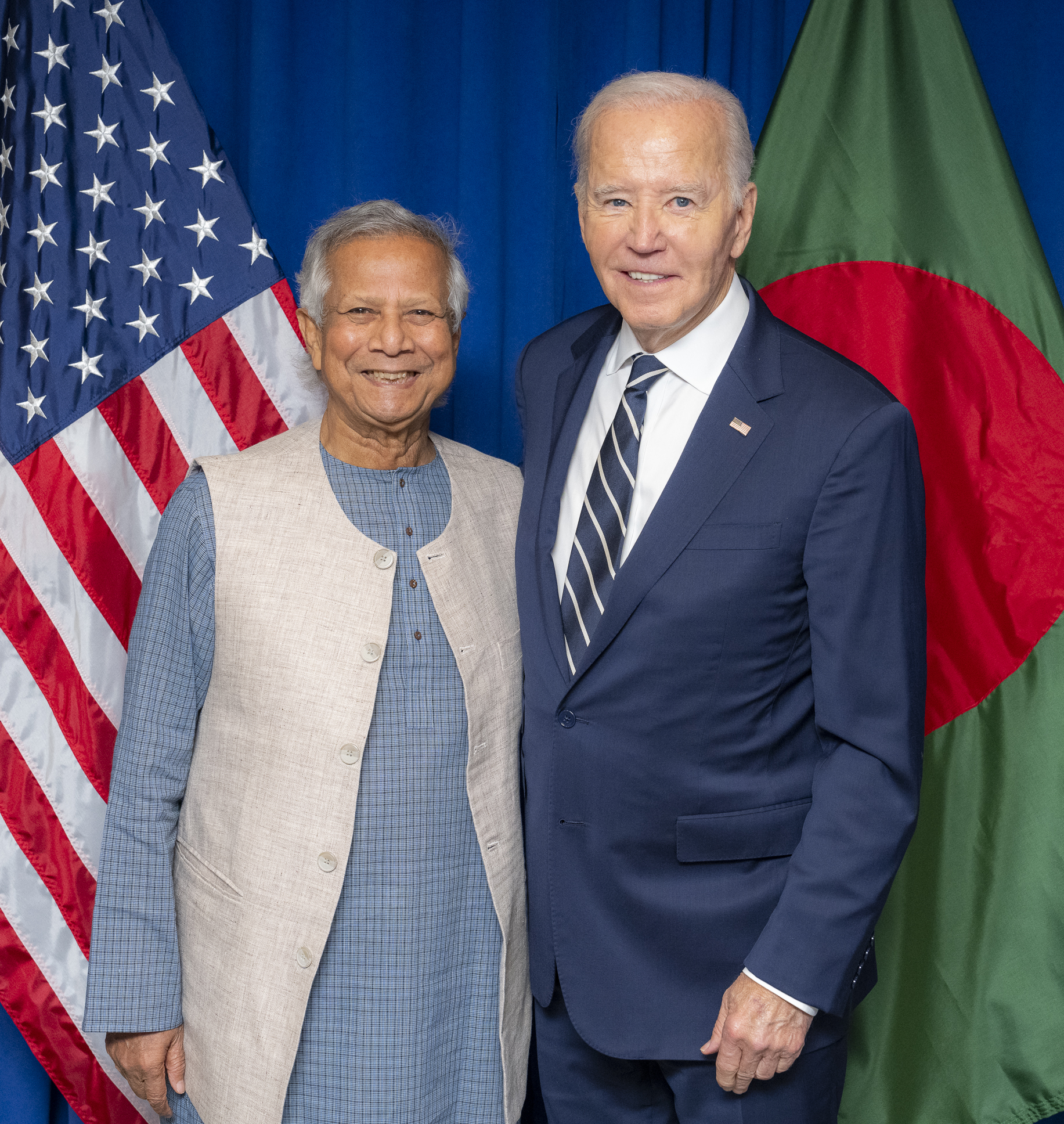
President Joe Biden with Chief Adviser Yunus at the U.N. Headquarters in the New York City.

This is the list of international visits undertaken by Muhammad Yunus while serving as the Chief Adviser of Bangladesh.

== List of visits ==
| Country | Location | Date(s) | Purpose(s) | Ref. | Note(s) |
|---|---|---|---|---|---|
| United States | New York | 23–28 September 2024 | To attend Seventy-ninth session of the United Nations General Assembly. | | First international trip |
| Azerbaijan | Baku | 11–14 November 2024 | To attend 2024 United Nations Climate Change Conference. | | |
| Egypt | Cairo | 18–20 December 2024 | To attend D-8 Organization for Economic Cooperation Conference | | |
| Switzerland | Davos | 21–25 January 2025 | To attend World Economic Forum | | |
| United Arab Emirates | Dubai | 13–14 February 2025 | To attend World Government Summit | | |
| China | Hainan and Beijing | 26–30 March 2025 | To attend Boao Forum for Asia (Hainan) | | First bilateral visit (Beijing) |
| Thailand | Bangkok | 3–4 April 2025 | To attend BIMSTEC summit | | |
| Qatar | Doha | 21–25 April 2025 | To attend Erthana summit | | |
| Vatican City | Vatican City | 26 – 27 April 2025 | To attend Pope Francis funeral | | |
| Japan | Tokyo | 28 May – 1 June 2025 | To participate in the 30th Nikkei Forum Future of Asia and hold bilateral talks with Japanese Prime Minister Shigeru Ishiba. | | |
| United Kingdom | London | 10–13 June 2025 | To hold talks about the renew bilateral ties, with an increased focus on economic cooperation | | |
| Malaysia | Kuala Lumpur | 11–13 August 2025 | To review the progress in diverse areas and improve bilateral ties | | |
| United States | New York | 22–30 September 2025 | To attend Eightieth session of the United Nations General Assembly. | | |
| Italy | Rome | 13-15 October 2025 | To join the annual World Food Forum (WFF) | | |
